= List of compositions by Franz Liszt =

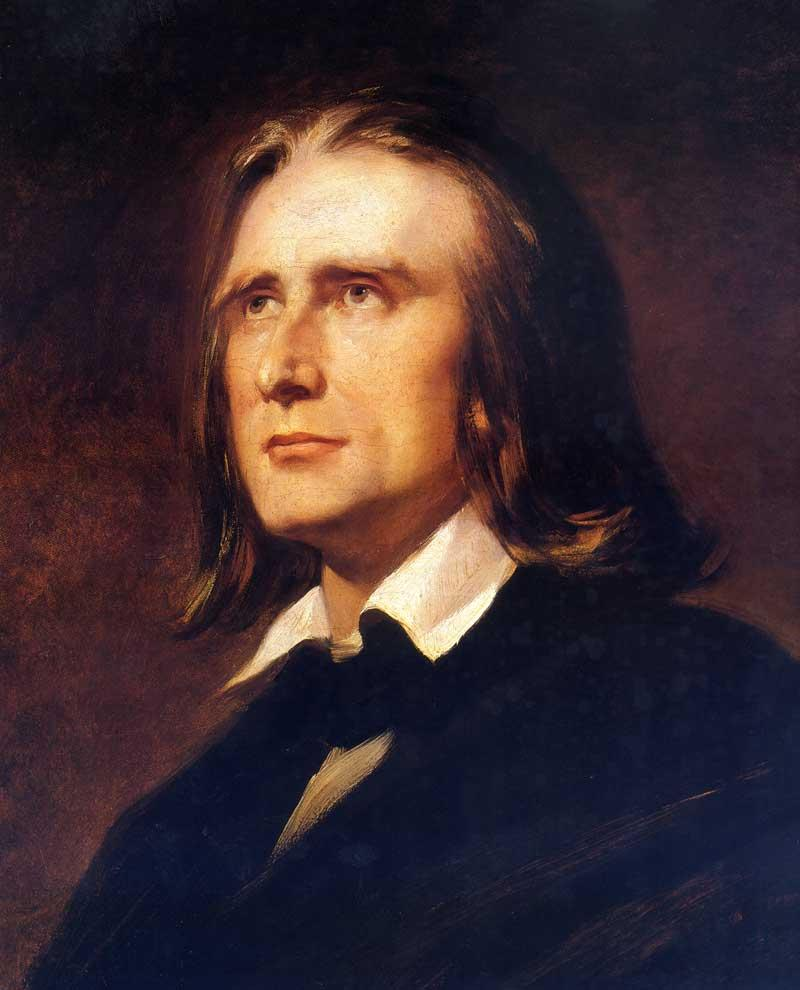
Franz Liszt, after a painting of 1856, by Wilhelm von Kaulbach.

Hungarian Romantic composer Franz Liszt (1811–1886) was especially prolific, composing more than 700 works. A virtuoso pianist himself, much of his output is dedicated to solo works for the instrument and is particularly technically demanding. The primary cataloguing system for his compositions was developed by Humphrey Searle; it has been thoroughly revamped by Michael Short and Leslie Howard.

== Legend ==
The table below gives the following information for works by Franz Liszt (where applicable):

1. S. — numbering as given in Humphrey Searle, The Music of Liszt, 1966 (with additions by Sharon Winklhofer and Leslie Howard). A number sign (#) signifies that a number is no longer in use.
2. LW. — numbering by R. Charnin Mueller and M. Eckhardt referenced in Grove Music Online (2010)
3. Title — normally following the New Liszt Edition and Library of Congress, as well as other authoritative sources
4. Forces — the instrumentation used (see Abbreviations for Instruments)
5. Key — the principal key of the work
6. Date — the year(s) of composition or arrangement, where known
7. Genre — works are grouped in the following broad categories: Stage, Choral (for many voices), Vocal (for individual voices), Orchestral, Chamber and Piano
8. Notes — Liszt's works often exist in multiple versions and he arranged many works by other composers, which are cross-referenced respectively mentioned here

== Catalogue of works ==
S.	LW	Title	Forces	Key	Date	Genre	Notes
1–350		=== Original works ===					
1		==== Opera ====					
1	O1	Don Sanche (Le château de l'amour)	vv ch orch		1824–25	Stage	opera in 1 act; libretto by Théaulon and de Rancé, after a story by Jean-Pierre Claris de Florian; first perf. 1825-10-17 in Paris; unpublished
2–66		==== Sacred choral works ====					
2	I4	Die Legende von der Heiligen Elisabeth	sop alt 3bar 2bass ch org orch		1857–62	Choral, sacred	extracts arr. for pf as S. 498a, S. 693a; for pf4h as S. 578; introduction arr. for org as S. 663a
3	I7	Christus	sop alt ten bar bass ch org orch		1866–72	Choral, sacred	Nos.6–8 based on S. 25, S. 29, S. 261; Nos.4 and 5 arr. for pf as S. 498b, for pf4h as S. 579; No.8 arr. for org as S. 664
4/1	I8a	Cantico di San Francesco	bar pf org/harm (+ mch)	F major	1862	Choral, sacred	1st version of S. 4/2; Alleluja arr. for org (+ tbn) as S. 677
4/2	I8b	Cantico del sol di Francesco d'Assisi	bar mch org orch	F major	1879–82	Choral, sacred	2nd version; arr. for pf as S. 499, for org as S. 760; Prelude arr. for pf as S. 498c, for org as S. 665
5/1	I1a	Sainte Cécile (Die heilige Cäcilia)	mez orch (?)		1845	Choral, sacred	1st version of S. 5/2; lost
5/2	I1b	Sainte Cécile (Die heilige Cäcilia) (Legende)	mez orch (+ ch)		1874	Choral, sacred	2nd version of S. 5/1; arr. for mez hp/pf/harm (+ ch) as S. 5/2a
5/2a	I1b	Sainte Cécile (Die heilige Cäcilia) (Legende)	mez hp/pf/harm (+ ch)		1874	Choral, sacred	arr. of S. 5/2
6	L15	Die Glocken des Strassburger Münsters	2vv ch org orch		1874–75	Choral, sacred	oratorio; prelude arr. for pf4h as S. 580; for pf as S. 500; for org (+ ch) as S. 666; for v org as S. 767 [?]
7	I10	Cantantibus organis (Antiphona in festo Santa Caeciliae)	alt ch orch	G major–G minor	1879	Choral, sacred	
7bis	I10	Cantantibus organis (Antiphona in festo Santa Caeciliae)	alt ch hp harm/org pf	G major–G minor	1879	Choral, sacred	
8/1	J5a	Missa quattuor vocum ad aequales	mch org		1846–47	Choral, sacred	1st version of S. 8/2
8/2	J5b	Missa quattuor vocum ad aequales (Szekszárd Mass)	mch org		1869	Choral, sacred	2nd version of S. 8/1; themes used in S. 264
9	I2	Missa Solennis (Graner Mass)	sop alt ten bass ch orch		1857–58	Choral, sacred	extract ('Poco adagio') arr. for pf as S. 747 [?]
10	J18	Missa Choral, sacredis	ch org		1859–65	Choral, sacred	
11	I9	Ungarische Krönungsmesse (Hungarian Coronation Mass)	4vv ch orch		1866–69	Choral, sacred	Nos.5 and 7 arr. for pf as S. 501, for pf4h as S. 581, for vn pf as S. 381, for vn org/harm as S. 678; No.5 arr. for org as S. 667; No.6 arr. for mch pf as S. 15a/1, for ch pf as S. 15a/2; No.7 arr. for vn orch as S. 362
12	J22	Requiem (Messe des morts)	4vv mch org (+ br perc)		1867–71	Choral, sacred	includes S. 45 as No.6; adapted for org as S. 266; No.6 arr. for mch org as S. 45
13/1	I3a	Psalm 13 (Herr, wie lange willst du meiner so gar vergessen)	4vv ch orch		1855–56	Choral, sacred	1st version of S. 13/2
13/2	I3b	Psalm 13 (Herr, wie lange willst du meiner so gar vergessen)	ten ch orch		1859–63	Choral, sacred	2nd version of S. 13/1; arr. for ten ch org as S. 132/2a
13/2a	I3b	Psalm 13 (Herr, wie lange willst du meiner so gar vergessen)	ten ch org		1866	Choral, sacred	arr. of S. 13/2
14/1	I5a	Psalm 18 (Coeli enarrant gloriam Dei / Die Himmel erzählen die Ehre Gottes)	mch orch (+ org)		1860	Choral, sacred	1st version of S. 14/2; arr. for mch ww br as S. 14/1a, for org as S. 667a
14/1a	I5a	Psalm 18 (Coeli enarrant gloriam Dei / Die Himmel erzählen die Ehre Gottes)	mch ww br		1860	Choral, sacred	arr. of S. 14/1; 1st version of S. 14/2a
14/2	I5b	Psalm 18 (Coeli enarrant gloriam Dei / Die Himmel erzählen die Ehre Gottes)	mch org		1870	Choral, sacred	2nd version of S. 14/1; arr. for mch ww br as S. 14/2a
14/2a	I5b	Psalm 18 (Coeli enarrant gloriam Dei / Die Himmel erzählen die Ehre Gottes)	mch ww br		1870	Choral, sacred	arr. of S. 14/2; 2nd version of S. 14/1a
15/1a	J10a	Psalm 23 (Mein Gott, der ist mein Hirt)	sop/ten mch hp/pf org/harm		1859–61?	Choral, sacred	1st version of S. 15/1b, S. 15/2a, S. 15/2b, S. 15/3
15/1b	K1	Psalm 23 (Mein Gott, der ist mein Hirt)	sop/ten hp/pf org/harm		1859–62	Choral, sacred	2nd version of S. 15/1a, S. 15/2a, S. 15/2b, S. 15/3
15/2a	J10b	Psalm 23 (Mein Gott, der ist mein Hirt)	sop/ten mch hp/pf		1859–62	Choral, sacred	3rd version of S. 15/1a, S. 15/1b, S. 15/2b, S. 15/3
15/2b	I1b	Psalm 23 (Mein Gott, der ist mein Hirt)	sop/ten hp/pf		1859–62	Choral, sacred	4th version of S. 15/1a, S. 15/1b, S. 15/2a, S. 15/3
15/3	S53	Psalm 23 (Mein Gott, der ist mein Hirt)	ch orch		1862	Choral, sacred	5th version of S. 15/1a, S. 15/1b, S. 15/2a, S. 15/2b; lost; renumbered from S. 15bis
15a/1	J6	Psalm 116 (Laudate Dominum)	mch pf		1869–74	Choral, sacred	arr. of S. 11/6
15a/2	J6	Psalm 116 (Laudate Dominum)	ch pf		1869–74	Choral, sacred	arr. of S. 11/6
16/1	K6	Psalm 129 (De profundis)	bar mch org		1880–81	Choral, sacred	originally intended for S. 688; 1st version of S. 16/2; themes re-used in S. 172a/8 and S. 173/4
16/2	J45	Psalm 129 (De profundis)	alt pf/org		1883	Choral, sacred	2nd version of S. 16/1; themes re-used in S. 172a/8 and S. 173/4
17/1	K2	Psalm 137 (An den Wassern zu Babylon)	alt vn hp/pf org/harm		1859	Choral, sacred	1st version of S. 17/2, S. 17/3
17/2	J11	Psalm 137 (An den Wassern zu Babylon)	sop fch hp/pf org/harm vn		1859–62	Choral, sacred	2nd version of S. 17/1, S. 17/3
17/3	S54	Psalm 137 (An den Wassern zu Babylon)	ch orch		1862	Choral, sacred	3rd version of S. 17/2, S. 17/3; lost
18	J4	Choruses with French texts (5):	ch		1846?	Choral, sacred	
18/1	J4/5	Qui m'a donné la naissance	ch		1846?	Choral, sacred	incomplete
18/2	J4/1	L'Eternel est son nom	ch		1846?	Choral, sacred	
18/3	J4/2	Chantons, chantons l'auteur de la lumière	ch		1846?	Choral, sacred	
18/4	J4/3	(Allegretto, moderato con grazia)	ch	A major	1846?	Choral, sacred	possibly same as S. 762
18/5	J4/4	Combien j'ai douce souvenance	ch		1846?	Choral, sacred	based on an Auverge folksong
19/1	J2/1	Hymne de l'enfant á son réveil (O père qu'adore mon père)	fch pf/harm (+ hp)		1840–44?	Choral, sacred	based on S. 171c; 1st version of S. 19/2, S. 19/3, S. 19/4; lost
19/2	J2/2	Hymne de l'enfant á son réveil (O père qu'adore mon père)	ch pf/harm		1860–62?	Choral, sacred	2nd version of S. 19/1, S. 19/3, S. 19/4; text in French and Italian
19/3	J2/3	Hymne de l'enfant á son réveil (O père qu'adore mon père)	ch pf/harm		1865	Choral, sacred	3rd version of S. 19/1, S. 19/2, S. 19/4; text in French and Italian
19/4	J2/4	Hymne de l'enfant à son réveil (O père qu'adore mon père)	fch pf/harm (+ hp)		1874	Choral, sacred	4th version of S. 19/1, S. 19/2, S. 19/3; text in French, German and Hungarian
20/1	J1/1	Ave Maria I	ch (+ org)	B♭ major	1842	Choral, sacred	1st version of S. 20/2; arr. for org as S. 667b/1
20/2	J1/2	Ave Maria I	ch org	A major	1852	Choral, sacred	2nd version of S. 20/1; arr. for org as S. 667b/2
21/1	J3/1	Pater noster I	mch		1846	Choral, sacred	based on S. 172a/6; 1st version of S. 21/2
21/2	J3/2	Pater noster I	mch		1852	Choral, sacred	2nd version of S. 21/1; published as "Pater noster II" and listed as such in some older listings (see also S. 29)
22	J52	Pater noster IV	ch org	C major	1850?	Choral, sacred	
23	J8	Domine salvum fac regem (Psalm 20)	ten mch org		1853	Choral, sacred	
24	J7	Te Deum I	mch org		1853?	Choral, sacred	published as "Te Deum II" and listed as such in some older listings (see also S. 27)
25	J9	Die Seligkeiten (Les béatitudes)	bar ch (+ org)		1859	Choral, sacred	rev. as S. 3/6
26	M33	Festgesang zur Eröffnung der zehnten allgemeinen deutschen Lehrerversammlung (Wir bau'n und bestellen das edelste Feld)	mch (+ org)		1858	Choral, sacred	
27	J12	Te Deum II	mch org (+ br perc)		1867	Choral, sacred	published as "Te Deum I" and listed as such in some older listings (see also S. 24)
28	J13	An den heiligen Franziskus von Paula (Gebet)	2ten 2bass mch org/harm (+3 tbn timp)		1860–74?	Choral, sacred	based on S. 175/2
29	J14	Pater noster II (Das Vater unser)	ch org	A♭ major	1860	Choral, sacred	rev. as S. 3/7; published as "Pater noster I" and listed as such in some older listings (see also S. 21/2)
30	J20	Responsorien und Antiphonen (Répons et Antiennes)	ch (+ org)		1860	Choral, sacred	
31/1	J15a/1	Christus ist geboren I (Weihnachtslied I)	ch org		1863	Choral, sacred	1st version of S. 31/2
31/2	J15a/2	Christus ist geboren I (Weihnachtslied I)	mch org		1863	Choral, sacred	2nd version of S. 31/1
32/1	J15b/1	Christus ist geboren II (Weihnachtslied II)	ch org/harm		1863	Choral, sacred	1st version of S. 32/2, S. 32/3; arr. for pf as S. 502
32/2	J15b/2	Christus ist geboren II (Weihnachtslied II)	mch (+ org)		1863	Choral, sacred	2nd version of S. 32/1, S. 32/3
32/3	J15c	Christus ist geboren II (Weihnachtslied II)	fch		1863	Choral, sacred	3rd version of S. 32/1, S. 32/2
33	J16	Slavimo slavno, Slaveni!	mch org		1863–66	Choral, sacred	arr. for pf as S. 503, for org as S. 668
34/1	J19/1	Ave maris stella	ch org	G major	1865–66	Choral, sacred	1st version of S. 34/2
34/2	J19/2	Ave maris stella	mch org	B♭ major	1868	Choral, sacred	2nd version of S. 34/1; arr. for v pf/harm as S. 680, for pf as S. 506, for harm as S. 669/2a, for org/harm as S. 669/2b
35/1	J17a	Crux! (Hymne des marins avec Antienne approbative de Notre Tout Saint Père Pie IX)	mch		1865	Choral, sacred	1st version of S. 35/2
35/2	J17b	Crux! (Hymne des marins avec Antienne approbative de Notre Tout Saint Père Pie IX)	fch/cch pf		1865	Choral, sacred	2nd version of S. 35/1
36	J21	Dall' alma Roma	2vv (+ org)		1867–68	Choral, sacred	based on S. 261
37	J23	Mihi autem adhaerere (Offertoire de la messe du patriarche séraphique San François)	mch org		1868	Choral, sacred	
38	J24	Ave Maria II	ch org	D major	1869	Choral, sacred	arr. for harm as S. 667c, for v org/harm as S. 681, for pf as S. 504/1 and S. 504/2
39/1	J25a	Inno a Maria Vergine	ch hp org		1869	Choral, sacred	1st version of S. 39/2
39/2	J25b	Inno a Maria Vergine	ch hp pf4h org/ham		1869	Choral, sacred	2nd version of S. 39/1
40	J28	O salutaris hostia I	fch org		1869	Choral, sacred	
41/1	J26/1	Pater noster III	ch pf/org	F major	1869	Choral, sacred	1st version of S. 41/2
41/2	J26/2	Pater noster III	mch pf/org/harm	B♭ major	1869	Choral, sacred	2nd version of S. 41/1
42/1	J27/1	Tantum ergo	fch org		1869	Choral, sacred	1st version of S. 42/2
42/2	J27/2	Tantum ergo	mch org		1869	Choral, sacred	2nd version of S. 42/3
43	J29	O salutaris hostia II	ch (+ org)	E major	1870	Choral, sacred	
44	J31	Ave verum corpus	ch (+ org)		1871	Choral, sacred	
45	J30	Libera me	mch org		1871	Choral, sacred	arr. of S. 12/6
46/1	J32/1	Anima Christi sanctifica me	mch org		1874	Choral, sacred	1st version of S. 46/1
46/2	J32/2	Anima Christi sanctifica me	mch org		1874	Choral, sacred	2nd version of S. 46/2
47	J41	Sankt Christoph (Legend)	fch pf harm (+ hp)		1881	Choral, sacred	unpublished
48	I6	Der Herr bewahret die Seelen seiner Heiligen	ch br timp org		1860–75?	Choral, sacred	
49	J42	O heilige Nacht (Weihnachtslied)	ten fch org/harm		1881	Choral, sacred	based on S. 186/2
49a	—	Adeste fidelis	fch		?	Choral, sacred	incomplete
50	A286b	Alte deutsche geistliche Weisen	ch kbd		1878–79	Choral, sacred	probably misattributed to Liszt, who arr. the pieces as S. 504b and S. 669a
50/1	A286b/8	Es segne uns Gott	ch kbd		1878–79	Choral, sacred	arr. for pf as S. 504b/3a, for ch org as S. 669a/1
50/2	A286b/4	Meine Seel' erhebt den Herrn (Gott sei gnädig und barmherzig)	ch kbd		1878–79	Choral, sacred	arr. for pf as S. 504b/3, for v ch/org as S. 669a/2, for ch org as S. 51
50/3	A286b/3	Nun ruhen alle Wälder	ch kbd		1878–79	Choral, sacred	arr. for pf as S. 504b/5, for v org as S. 669a/3
50/4	A286b/5	O Haupt voll Blut und Wunden	ch kbd		1878–79	Choral, sacred	arr. for pf as S. 504b/6, for v org as S. 669a/4
50/5	A286b/6	O Lamm Gottes!	ch kbd		1878–79	Choral, sacred	arr. for pf as S. 504b/7, for v pf/org as S. 669a/5
50/6	A286b/1	Was Gott tut, das ist wohlgetan	ch kbd		1878–79	Choral, sacred	arr. for pf as S. 504b/10, for v org as S. 669a/6
50/7	A286b/7	Wer nur den lieben Gott läßt walten	ch kbd		1878–79	Choral, sacred	arr. for pf as S. 504b/11, for v org as S. 669a/7
50/8	A286b/9	Vexilla Regis	ch kbd		1878–79	Choral, sacred	arr. for pf as S. 504b/9
50/9	A286b/10	Crux ave benedicta	ch kbd		1878–79	Choral, sacred	arr. for pf as S. 504b/1
50/10	A286b/2	O Traurigkeit	ch kbd		1878–79	Choral, sacred	arr. for pf as S. 504b/8
50/11	A286b/12	Nun danket alle Gott!	ch kbd		1878–79	Choral, sacred	arr. for pf as S. 504b/4
50/12	A286b/11	Jesu Christe (Die fünf Wunden)	ch kbd		1878–79	Choral, sacred	arr. for pf as S. 504b/2
51	J34	Meine Seel' erhebt den Herrn! (Gott sei uns gnädig und barmherzig) (Der Kirchensegen)	ch org		1878	Choral, sacred	arr. of S. 50/2
52	J35	Septem sacramenta	mez bar ch org/harm		1878–84	Choral, sacred	
53	J33	Via crucis (Les 14 stations de la croix)	vv ch pf/org/harm		1876–79	Choral, sacred	arr. for org as S. 669b, for pf4h as S. 583, for pf as S. 504
54	J36	O Roma nobilis	ch org		1878–79	Choral, sacred	based on a chorus by Giuseppe Baini; Liszt's authorship of Choral, sacred parts doubtful; see also arrs. for org as S. 669c, for pf as S. 506b
55	J38	Ossa arida	ch org4h		1879	Choral, sacred	
56	J37	Rosario	ch org/harm (+ bar)		1879	Choral, sacred	
56/1	J37/1	Mysteria gaudiosa	ch org/harm		1879	Choral, sacred	arr. for org/harm as S. 670/1
56/2	J37/2	Mysteria dolorosa	ch org/harm		1879	Choral, sacred	arr. for org/harm as S. 670/2
56/3	J37/3	Mysteria gloriosa	ch org/harm		1879	Choral, sacred	arr. for org/harm as S. 670/3
56/4	J37/4	Pater noster	bar/mch org/harm		1879	Choral, sacred	composed at the same time as Rosario S. 56 nos.1–3, and published as no.4 of Rosario (as '"Pater noster" zum Rosario'), but not certain it was intended by Liszt to be included with it; not included in org/harm solo version of Rosario (S. 670)
57	J46	In domum Domini ibimus	ch br perc org		1884	Choral, sacred	arr. for pf as S. 505, for org as S. 671
58	J40	O sacrum convivium	alt fch org/harm		1880–85	Choral, sacred	arr. for org/harm as S. 674a
59	J39	Pro Papa	ch org		1880	Choral, sacred	
59/1	J39/1	Tu es Petrus	mch org		1880	Choral, sacred	
59/2	J39/2	Dominus conservet eum	ch org		1880	Choral, sacred	
60	J44	Ave Maria III (Sposalizio)	alt fch org/harm		1883	Choral, sacred	based on S. 161/1; arr. for org/harm as S. 671a, for v 2pf as S. 700g
61	J43	Nun danket alle Gott	ch/mch 2tpt 3tbn timp org		1883	Choral, sacred	arr. for org as S. 674c
62	J47	Mariengarten	ch org (+ alt ten)		1884?	Choral, sacred	
63	J48	Qui seminant in lacrimis (Psalm 125)	ch org		1883	Choral, sacred	
64	J49	Pax vobiscum!	mch (+ org)		1885	Choral, sacred	
65	J50	Qui Mariam absolvisti	bar ch org/harm		1885	Choral, sacred	
66	J51	Salve Regina	ch		1885	Choral, sacred	
67–94		==== Secular choral works ====					
67	L1	Festkantate zur Enthüllung des Beethoven-Denkmals in Bonn (Was versammelt hier die Menge) (Beethoven Cantata No.1)	6vv orch		1845	Choral, secular	arr. for pf4h as S. 584; extracts arr. for pf in S. 507
68	L12	Zur Säcularfeier Beethovens (Beethoven Cantata No.2)	4vv ch orch		1869–70	Choral, secular	
69i	L8/1	Chöre zu Herders Entfesseltem Prometheus	sop alt 2ten 2bass ch orch		1850	Choral, secular	1st version of S. 69ii, S. 69iii; No.4 arr. for pf as S. 507a (incomplete); No.5 arr. for pf as S. 692e (unfinished); overture rev. as S. 99
69ii	L8/2	Chöre zu Herders Entfesseltem Prometheus	sop alt 2ten 2bass 2ch orch		1855–59	Choral, secular	2nd version of S. 69i, S. 69iii; No.4 arr. for pf as S. 508, for pf4h as S. 585
69iii	L8/3	Chöre zu Herders Entfesseltem Prometheus	sop alt 2ten 2bass 2ch orch		1877?	Choral, secular	3rd version of S. 69i, S. 69ii
70i	L9/1	An die Künstler	4vv mch ww br		1853	Choral, secular	instrumentation by Joachim Raff; 1st version of S. 70ii, S. 70iii, S70iv
70ii	L9/2	An die Künstler	4vv mch orch		1853–54	Choral, secular	2nd version of S. 70i, S. 70iii, S70iv
70iii	L9/3	An die Künstler	4vv mch org orch		1858	Choral, secular	3rd version of S. 70i, S. 70ii, S70iv; themes used in S. 114
70iv	L9/3	An die Künstler	4vv mch org orch		1859	Choral, secular	4th version of S. 70i, S. 70ii, S. 70iii; themes used in S. 114
71	L11	Gaudeamus igitur (Humoreske)			1869–70		arr. for pf as S. 509; for pf4h as S. 586
71bis	–	Gaudeamus igitur (Humoreske)			1869–70	Choral, secular	vocal score of S. 71; arr. for pf as S. 509; for pf4h as S. 586
72		Vierstimmige Männergesänge (4):	mch pf		1841–42	Choral, secular	
72/1	M2/1	Rheinweinlied (Wo solch ein Feuer)	mch pf		1841	Choral, secular	
72/1a	M2/2	Rheinweinlied (Wo solch ein Feuer)			1884	Choral, secular	instrumented by Károly Huber, revised by Liszt
72/2	M3	Studentenlied aus Goethe's Faust (Es lebt' eine Ratt im Kellernest)	mch		1841–42	Choral, secular	
72/3	M4	Reiterlied I (Die bange Nacht ist nun herum)	mch	B♭ major	1841–42	Choral, secular	for alternative setting see S. 72/4
72/4	M5	Reiterlied II (Die bange Nacht ist nun herum)	mch	C major	1841–42	Choral, secular	for alternative setting see S. 72/3
73	M19	Es war einmal ein König (Flohlied)	bar/bass mch pf		1844–45	Choral, secular	
74/1	M1	Das deutsche Vaterland I (Was ist das deutsche Vaterland?)	4vv mch pf	D major	1841	Choral, secular	1st version of S. 74/2
74/2	M27	Das deutsche Vaterland II (Was ist das deutsche Vaterland?)	mch	C major	1848	Choral, secular	2nd version of S. 74/1
75/1	M12/1	Über allen Gipfeln ist Ruh' (Wanderers Nachtlied)	mch		1842	Choral, secular	No.3 of Vierstimmige Männergesänge; 1st version of S. 75/2, S. 75/3
75/2	M12/2	Über allen Gipfeln ist Ruh' (Wanderers Nachtlied)	mch		1849	Choral, secular	2nd version of S. 75/1, S. 75/3
75/3	M12/3	Über allen Gipfeln ist Ruh' (Wanderers Nachtlied)	mch 2hn		1856	Choral, secular	3rd version of S. 75/1, S. 75/2
76	M11	Das düstre Meer umrauscht mich	mch pf		1842	Choral, secular	No.2 of Vierstimmige Männergesänge
76a	M15	Heil! Unsrer Glocke heil	mch pf		1843	Choral, secular	
77	M26	Die lustige Legion	mch (+ pf)		1846?	Choral, secular	
78	M17	Trinkspruch (Giesst Wein in die Gläser, ihr Zecher!)	mch pf		1843–44	Choral, secular	No.1 of Sechs Männerchöre
79/1	M14/2	Titan (Auf des Athos blauen Felsenspitzen)	bar mch pf		1842–47	Choral, secular	2nd version of S. 700j; arr. for bar mch orch as S. 79/2
79/2	L4	Titan (Auf des Athos blauen Felsenspitzen)	bar mch orch		1848	Choral, secular	arr. of S. 79/1
80	L2	Les quatre élémens	mch pf/pf4h		1844–45	Choral, secular	
80/1	L2/1	La terre	mch pf		1844–45	Choral, secular	
80/2	L2/2	Les aquilons	mch pf4h		1844	Choral, secular	
80/3	L2/3	Les flots	mch pf		1845	Choral, secular	
80/4	L2/4	Les astres	mch pf		1845?	Choral, secular	arr. for mch orch by Liszt and August Conradi as S. 80b/4
80bis	M20	Les quatre élémens	mch, piano	vocal score of S. 80	1844–48	Choral, secular	vocal score of S. 80/1
80bis/1	L2/1	La terre	mch orch		1844–48	Choral, secular	vocal score of S. 80
80bis/2	M20/2	Les aquilons	mch orch		1844–48	Choral, secular	vocal score of S. 80
80bis/3	M20/3	Les flots	mch orch		1845–48	Choral, secular	vocal score of S. 80
80bis/4	M20/4	Les astres	mch orch		1845–48	Choral, secular	vocal score of S. 80
81/1	M21	Le forgeron (Le fer est dur, frappons, frappons)	2vv mch pf		1845	Choral, secular	arr. for 2vv mch orch by Liszt and August Conradi as S. 81/2
81/2	L3	Le forgeron (Le fer est dur, frappons, frappons)	2vv mch orch		1845–48	Choral, secular	arr. of S. 81/1 by Liszt and August Conradi
81a	M25	A patakhoz (A patakcsa)	mch		1846	Choral, secular	
82	M16	Arbeiterchor (Herbei, herbei, den Spath' und Schaufel ziert)	bar mch pf		1843–48?	Choral, secular	arr. for pf as S. 510; arr. for pf4h as S. 587
83a	L5	Ungaria-Kantate (Aus Osten aus der Sonne Tor)	vv mch pf		1842–48?	Choral, secular	arr. for vv mch orch by Liszt and August Conradi as S. 83b
83b	L5	Ungaria-Kantate (Aus Osten aus der Sonne Tor)	vv mch orch		1848	Choral, secular	arr. of S. 83a by Liszt and August Conradi
84/1	M28/1	Licht, mehr Licht	mch 3tbn tba		1849	Choral, secular	1st version of S. 84/2
84/2	M28/2	Licht, mehr Licht	mch 2tpt 3tbn		1856	Choral, secular	2nd version of S. 84/1
85/1	M29/1	Chor der Engel aus Goethe's Faust II (Rosen, ihr blendenden)	mch pf		1849	Choral, secular	1st version of S. 85/2, S. 85/3
85/2	M29/2	Chor der Engel aus Goethe's Faust II (Rosen, ihr blendenden)	fch hp pf/harm		1849	Choral, secular	2nd version of S. 85/1, S. 85/3
85/3	L7	Chor der Engel aus Goethe's Faust II (Rosen, ihr blendenden)	ch hp/pf		1849	Choral, secular	3rd version of S. 85/1, S. 85/2
86a	M30	Festchor zur Enthüllung des Herder-Denkmals in Weimar	mch pf		1850	Choral, secular	arr. for mch br as S. 86b
86b	M30	Festchor zur Enthüllung des Herder-Denkmals in Weimar	mch br		1850	Choral, secular	arr. of S. 86a
87/1a	L10a	Weimars Volkslied (Von der Wartburg)	mch ww br perc	E major	1857	Choral, secular	arr. of S. 313; 1st version of S. 87/1c; arr. for mch pf as S. 87/1b
87/1b	M32a	Weimars Volkslied (Von der Wartburg)	mch pf	E major	1857, rev. 1875?	Choral, secular	arr. of S. 87/1a
87/1c	L10a	Weimars Volkslied (Von der Wartburg)	mch ww br perc	E major	1875?	Choral, secular	2nd version of S. 87/1a; renumbered from S. 87/1bis
87/2	M32b	Weimars Volkslied (Von der Wartburg)	mch (+ pf)	F major	1857?	Choral, secular	arr. of S. 313
87/3a	M32c/1	Weimars Volkslied (Von der Wartburg)	mch	E major	1860?	Choral, secular	arr. of S. 313; 1st version of S. 87/3b
87/3b	M32c/2	Weimars Volkslied (Von der Wartburg)	mch	E major	1875?	Choral, secular	2nd version of S. 87/3a; not published
87/4	M32d	Weimars Volkslied (Von der Wartburg)	mch org	E major	1875	Choral, secular	arr. of S. 313
87/5	M32e	Weimars Volkslied (Von der Wartburg)	mch (+ pf)	E major	1875	Choral, secular	arr. of S. 313 [by Bernhard Sulze?]
87/6	M32f	Weimars Volkslied (Von der Wartburg)	uch	E major	1875?	Choral, secular	arr. of S. 313
87/7	M32g	Weimars Volkslied (Von der Wartburg)	cch	F major	1875?	Choral, secular	arr. of S. 313
87/8a	L10b/1	Weimars Volkslied (Von der Wartburg)	uch br	C major	1857?	Choral, secular	arr. of S. 313; arr. for uch pf as S. 87/8b
87/8b	L10b/2	Weimars Volkslied (Von der Wartburg)	uch pf	C major	1857?	Choral, secular	arr. of S. 87/8a
88	M34b	Mit klingendem Spiel I (Morgenlied)	fch		1859	Choral, secular	alternative text to S. 89
89	M34a	Mit klingendem Spiel II (Morgenlied)	cch		1859	Choral, secular	alternative text to S. 88
90/1a	M31/1	Vereins-Lied (Frisch auf, zu neuem Leben)	mch		1855	Choral, secular	1st version of S. 90/1b, S. 90/1c
90/1b	M31/2	Vereins-Lied (Frisch auf, zu neuem Leben)	mch		1857	Choral, secular	2nd version of S. 90/1a, S. 90/1c
90/1c	M31/3	Vereins-Lied (Frisch auf, zu neuem Leben)	mch		1860	Choral, secular	No.1 of Für Männergesang; 3rd version of S. 90/1a, S. 90/1b
90/2a	M7/1	Ständchen (Hüttelein, still und klein)	ten mch	A major	1841–43?	Choral, secular	1st version of S. 90/2b, S. 90/2c
90/2b	M7/2	Ständchen (Hüttelein, still und klein)	ten mch	A major	1845–49?	Choral, secular	No.6 of Sechs Männerchöre; 2nd version of S. 90/2a, S. 90/2c
90/2c	M7/3	Ständchen (Hüttelein, still und klein)	ten mch	G major	1857–60	Choral, secular	No.2 of Für Männergesang; 3rd version of S. 90/2a, S. 90/2b
90/3a	M10/1	Wir sind nicht Mumien	mch pf		1842	Choral, secular	No.1 of Vierstimmige Männergesänge; 1st version of S. 90/3b
90/3b	M10/2	Wir sind nicht Mumien	mch pf		1860–61	Choral, secular	No.3 of Für Männergesang; 2nd version of S. 90/3a
90/4a	M22/1	Vor der Schlacht (Es rufet Gott uns mahnend)	mch pf		1845	Choral, secular	1st version of S. 90/4b; arr. for pf as S. 511/1
90/4b	M22/2	Vor der Schlacht (Es rufet Gott uns mahnend)	mch		1860	Choral, secular	No.4 of Für Männergesang; 2nd version of S. 90/4a
90/5a	M23/1	Nicht gezagt	mch pf	A♭ major	1845	Choral, secular	1st version of S. 90/5b; arr. for pf as S. 511/2
90/5b	M23/2	Nicht gezagt	mch	G major	1860	Choral, secular	No.5 of Für Männergesang; 2nd version of S. 90/5a
90/6a	M24/1	Es rufet Got	mch pf		1845	Choral, secular	1st version of S. 90/6b; arr. for pf as S. 511/3
90/6b	M24/2	Es rufet Got	mch		1860	Choral, secular	No.6 of Für Männergesang; 2nd version of S. 90/6a
90/7a	M18/1	Soldatenlied aus Faust (Burgen mit hohen Mauern und Zinnen)	mch (+tpt timp)		1844	Choral, secular	No.5 of Sechs Männerchöre; 1st version of S. 90/7b
90/7b	M18/2	Soldatenlied aus Faust (Burgen mit hohen Mauern und Zinnen)	mch (+tpt timp)		1860–61	Choral, secular	No.7 of Für Männergesang; 2nd version of S. 90/7a
90/8a	M9/1	Die alten Sagen kunden	mch pf	B♭ major	1841–45?	Choral, secular	No.2 of Sechs Männerchöre; 1st version of S. 90/8b
90/8b	M9/2	Die alten Sagen kunden	4vv mch	A minor	1860–61	Choral, secular	No.8 of Für Männergesang; 2nd version of S. 90/8a
90/9a	M8/1	Saatengrün	mch pf/(hp?)		1843?	Choral, secular	No.3 of Sechs Männerchöre; 1st version of S. 90/9b
90/9b	M8/2	Saatengrün	mch	A major	1860–61	Choral, secular	No.9 of Für Männergesang; 2nd version of S. 90/9a
90/10a	M6/1	Der Gang um Mitternacht (Ich schreite mit dem Geist)	mch		1841–43?	Choral, secular	No.4 of Sechs Männerchöre; 1st version of S. 90/10b
90/10b	M6/2	Der Gang um Mitternacht (Ich schreite mit dem Geist)	ten mch		1860	Choral, secular	No.10 of Für Männergesang; 2nd version of S. 90/10a
90/11a	M35/1	Festlied zu Schillers Jubelfeier 10 November 1859	bar mch		1859	Choral, secular	1st version of S. 90/11b
90/11b	M35/2	Festlied zu Schillers Jubelfeier 10 November 1859	bar mch		1860	Choral, secular	No.11 of Für Männergesang; 2nd version of S. 90/11a
90/12a	M13/1	Gottes ist der Orient	mch	B major	1842	Choral, secular	No.4 of Vierstimmige Männergesänge; 1st version of S. 90/12b
90/12b	M13/2	Gottes ist der Orient	mch	A major	1860–61	Choral, secular	No.12 of Für Männergesang; 2nd version of S. 90/12a
91/1	M36/1	Das Lied der Begeisterung (A lelkesedés dala)	mch		1871	Choral, secular	1st version of S. 91/2; German and Hungarian text
91/2	M36/2	Das Lied der Begeisterung (Was nützt mir der Erde reichstes Gut)	mch org		1874	Choral, secular	2nd version of S. 91/1; German text only
92	—	Carl August weilt mit uns (Festgesang zur Enthüllung des Carl-August-Denkmals in Weimar)	fch br timp		1875	Choral, secular	fanfare arr. for pf as S. 542b
93/1	L17a	Magyar király-dal (Ungarisches Königslied)	mch		1883	Choral, secular	arr. of S. 340
93/2	L17b	Magyar király-dal (Ungarisches Königslied)	ch		1883	Choral, secular	arr. of S. 340
93/3	L17c	Magyar király-dal (Ungarisches Königslied)	mch pf		1883	Choral, secular	arr. of S. 340
93/4	L17d	Magyar király-dal (Ungarisches Königslied)	ch pf		1883	Choral, secular	arr. of S. 340
93/5	L17e	Magyar király-dal (Ungarisches Königslied)	mch orch		1883	Choral, secular	arr. of S. 340
93/6	L17f	Magyar király-dal (Ungarisches Königslied)	ch orch		1883	Choral, secular	arr. of S. 340
93/7	L17g	Magyar király-dal (Ungarisches Königslied)	cch		1883	Choral, secular	arr. of S. 340
94	M38	Gruss (Glück auf)	mch		1885	Choral, secular	
95–119		==== Orchestral works ====					
95–107		===== Symphonic poems =====					
95	G1	Ce qu'on entend sur la montagne (Symphonic Poem No.1)	orch		1848–49, rev. 1850, 1854	Orchestral, symphonic poem	arr. for pf4h as S. 589; arr. for 2pf as S. 635; see also S. 261a
96	G2	Tasso: Lamento e Trionfo (Symphonic Poem No.2)	orch		1849, rev. 1850–51, 1854	Orchestral, symphonic poem	arr. for pf4h as S. 590; arr. for 2pf as S. 636; see also S. 112/3
97	G3	Les préludes (Symphonic Poem No.3)	orch		1850–55	Orchestral, symphonic poem	based on projected overture to S. 80b; arr. for pf4h as S. 591, for 2pf as S. 637; for pf as S. 511a
98	G9	Orpheus (Symphonic Poem No.4)	orch		1853–54	Orchestral, symphonic poem	arr. for pf as S. 511b, for pf4h as S. 592. for 2pf as S. 638, for org as S. 672a; see also S. 167d
99	G6	Prometheus (Symphonic Poem No.5)	orch		1855	Orchestral, symphonic poem	based on overture to S. 69; arr. for pf4h as S. 593, for 2pf as S. 639
100	G7	Mazeppa (Symphonic Poem No.6)	orch		1851–54	Orchestral, symphonic poem	partly based on S. 139/4; arr. for pf as S. 511c, for pf4h as S. 594, for 2pf as S. 640
101	G10	Festklänge (Symphonic Poem No.7)	orch		1853, rev. 1861	Orchestral, symphonic poem	arr. for pf as S. 511d, for pf4h as S. 595, for 2pf as S. 641
102	G4	Héroïde funèbre (Symphonic Poem No.8)	orch		1854–56	Orchestral, symphonic poem	based on 1st movement of S. 690; arr. for pf4h as S. 596a, for 2pf as S. 642
103	G13	Hungaria (Symphonic Poem No.9)	orch		1854	Orchestral, symphonic poem	arr. for pf as S. 511e, for pf4h as S. 596, for 2pf as S. 643
104	G22	Hamlet (Symphonic Poem No.10)	orch		1858	Orchestral, symphonic poem	arr. for pf4h as S. 597, for 2pf as S. 644
105	G17	Hunnenschlacht (Symphonic Poem No.11)	orch		1855–57	Orchestral, symphonic poem	arr. for pf4h as S. 596b, for 2pf as S. 645
106	G15	Die Ideale (Symphonic Poem No.12)	orch		1856–57	Orchestral, symphonic poem	themes used in S. 520; arr. for pf4h as S. 596c, for 2pf as S. 646
107	G38	Von der Wiege bis zum Grabe (From the Cradle to the Grave) (Symphonic Poem No.13)	orch		1882	Orchestral, arr.	arr. of S. 512; see also S. 133
108–119		===== Other orchestral works =====					
108	G12	Faust Symphony (Eine Faust-Symphonie)	orch (+ ten mch)		1854, 1857–61, 1880	Orchestral	arr. for 2pf as S. 647; 2nd movement arr. for pf as S. 513
109	G14	Dante Symphony (Eine Symphonie zu Dantes Divina Commedia)	orch fch		1855–56	Orchestral	themes re-used in S. 182a?; arr. for 2pf as S. 648; partially arr. for org/harm as S. 672b; see also S. 167f
109a	–	Grand Overture	orch		1842	Orchestra	Overture of Don Sanche, S. 1 when performed separately
110	G16	Episoden aus Lenau's Faust (2):	orch		1856–61	Orchestral	
110/1	G16/1	Der nächtliche Zug	orch		1856–61	Orchestral	arr. for pf as S. 513a; for pf4h as S. 599/1
110/2	G16/2	Der Tanz in der Dorfschenke (Mephisto Waltz)	orch		1856–61	Orchestral	1st version of S. 110/2a; arr. for pf as S. 514
111	G37	Mephisto Waltz No.2 (Zweiter Mephisto-Walzer)	orch		1880–81	Orchestral	arr. of S. 515
112	G25	Odes funèbres (3):	orch		1860–66	Orchestral	
112/1	G25/1	Les morts	orch (+ mch)		1860	Orchestral	arr. for pf as S. 516; for pf4h as S. 601; for org as S. 268/2
112/2	G25/2	La notte	orch		1860–64	Orchestral	arr. for pf as S. 516a; for pf4h as S. 602; for vn pf as S. 377a
112/3	G25/3	Le triomphe funèbre du Tasse	orch		1866	Orchestral	epilogue to S. 96; arr. for pf as S. 517, for pf4h as S. 602/3; also for 2pf as S. 757(?)
113/1	G28/1	Boże, coś Polskę	orch		1863	Orchestral	based on an old Polish song [formerly S. 709]; 1st version of S. 113/2; arr. for pf4h as S. 604/1
113/2	G28/2	Salve Polonia (Interludium aus dem Oratorium St. Stanislaus)	orch		1884	Orchestral	interlude to S. 688; 2nd version of S. 113/1; arr. for pf as S. 518, for pf4h as S. 604/2
113a	G27	Légendes (2):	orch		1863	Orchestral	arr. of S. 175
113a/1	G27/1	St François d'Assise: la prédication aux oiseaux	orch		1863	Orchestral	arr. of S. 175/1
113a/2	G27/2	St François de Paule: marchant sur les flots	orch		1863	Orchestral	arr. of S. 175/2
114	G20	Künstlerfestzug zur Schillerfeier 1859	orch		1857–59	Orchestral	uses themes from S. 70/3; arr. for pf as S. 520; arr. for pf4h as S. 605
115	G5	Festmarsch zur Goethe-Jubiläumsfeier	orch		1857	Orchestral	based on S. 227; arr. for pf as S. 521; arr. for pf4h as S. 606
116	G23	Festmarsch nach Motiven von E.H.z.S.-C.-G.	orch		1858–59	Orchestral	based on themes from the opera Diana von Solang by Ernst II, Duke of Saxe-Coburg-Gotha; arr. for pf as S. 522; for pf4h as S. 607
117	G29	Rákóczi-Marsch	orch		1863–67	Orchestral	arr. of S. 244/15; arr. for pf as S. 244a; arr. for pf4h as S. 608; arr. for 2pf as S. 652a
118	G33	Ungarischer Marsch zur Krönungsfeier in Ofen-Pest am 8. Juni 1867	orch		1870	Orchestral	arr. for pf as S. 523; arr. for pf4h as S. 609
119	G35	Ungarischer Sturmmarsch (Hungarian Battle March)	orch		1875	Orchestral	based on S. 232; arr. for pf as S. 524, for pf4h as S. 610
120–126a		==== Pianoforte and orchestra ====					
120	H2	Grande fantaisie symphonique (über Themen aus Hector Berlioz' Lélio)	pf orch		1834	Orchestral, piano	based on themes from Lélio, ou le retour à la vie, H. 55 by Hector Berlioz
121	H1	Malédiction	pf str	E minor	1833	Orchestral, piano	
121a	H3	De Profundis (Psaume instrumentale)	pf orch		1834–35	Orchestral, piano	formerly S. 691; unfinished
122	H9	Fantasie über Motive aus Beethovens Ruinen von Athen	pf orch		1852	Orchestral, piano	based on S. 388b, using themes from Die Ruinen von Athen, Op. 113 by Ludwig van Beethoven; arr. for 2pf as S. 649, for pf as S. 389; themes also used in S. 388
123	H12	Fantasie über ungarische Volksmelodien	pf orch		1846–52	Orchestral, piano	based on S. 244/14
124	H4	Piano Concerto No.1	pf orch	E♭ major	1835–56	Orchestral, piano	arr. for 2pf as S. 650
125	H6	Piano Concerto No.2	pf orch	A major	1839-57	Orchestral, piano	based on S. 524a; arr. for 2pf as S. 651
125a	Q6	Piano Concerto [No.3]	pf orch	E♭ major	1835–39	Orchestral, piano	unfinished; performing version realized by Jay Rosenblatt
126i	H8	Totentanz	pf orch		1847–53	Orchestral, piano	1st version of S. 126ii; published in altered form by Busoni; original score unpublished (in private collection)
126ii	H8	Totentanz	pf orch		1859–64?	Orchestral, piano	2nd version of S. 126i; arr. for pf as S. 525, for 2pf as S. 652
126a#	W14	Concerto in the Hungarian Style	pf orch			Orchestral, piano	not by Liszt (see Ungarische Zigeunerweisen [S. 714] by Sophie Menter)
126b–135		==== Chamber music, etc. ====					
126b	D1	Waltzes (2):	vn pf		1823–25?	Chamber	
126b/1	D1/1	Waltz	vn pf	A major	1823–25?	Chamber	
126b/2	D1/2	Waltz aus dem Ballet "Die Amazonen"	vn pf	A major	1823–25?	Chamber	based on a theme from the ballet Die Amazonen by Robert von Gallenberg; arr. for pf as S. 208a
126c	D2	Trio	vn vc pf		1835	Chamber	formerly S. 717; ms. in private hands; unobtainable
127	D3	Duo (Sonata) ["sur des thèmes polonais"]	vn pf	C♯ minor	1835	Chamber	based on No.2 of the Mazurkas, Op. 6 by Frédéric Chopin
128	D4	Grand Duo Concertant (sur la romance de M. Lafont, "Le marin")	vn pf		1849?	Chamber	
129	D12	Epithalam (zu Eduard Reményis Vermählungsfeier)	vn pf		1872	Chamber	arr. for pf as S. 526; arr. for pf4h as S. 611 [?]
130a	D13a	Elegy No.1	hp vc pf harm		1874	Chamber	arr. of S. 196; see also S. 130b, S. 130c, S. 612
130b	D13b	Elegy No.1	vc pf		1874	Chamber	arr. of S. 196; see also S. 130a, S. 130c, S. 612
130c	D13c	Elegy No.1	vn pf (+ harm)		1874	Chamber	arr. of S. 196; see also S. 130a, S. 130b, S. 612
131	D14	Elegy No.2	vc pf		1877–78	Chamber	arr. of S. 197; see also S. 131a
131a	D14	Elegy No.2	vn pf		1877–78	Chamber	arr. of S. 197; see also S. 131; renumbered from S. 131bis
132a	D16a	Romance oubliée	va pf		1880	Chamber	arr. of S. 527; see also S. 132b, S. 132c
132b	D16b	Romance oubliée	vn pf		1880	Chamber	arr. of S. 527; see also S. 132a, S. 132c
132c	D16c	Romance oubliée	vc pf		1880	Chamber	arr. of S. 527; see also S. 132a, S. 132b
133#	S61	Die Wiege (The Cradle)					deleted; see S. 107
134	D19/2	La lugubre gondola (Die Trauer-Gondel)	vc pf		1882–83	Chamber	arr. of S. 200/1
134a	D19/1	La lugubre gondola (Die Trauer-Gondel)	vn pf		1885	Chamber	arr. of S. 200/2; renumbered from S. 134bis
135	D20	Am Grabe Richard Wagners	2vn va vc (+ hp)		1883	Chamber	using theme from the Prelude of S. 6; arr. for pf as S. 202, for org as S. 267
136–254		==== Solo Piano ====					
136–146		===== Studies =====					
136	A8	Étude en douze exercices:	pf		1826	Piano, etude	published as Op. 6; originally intended as 1st series of 48 pieces (with S. 136a); rev. as S. 137
136/1	A8/1	(Allegro con fuoco)	pf	C major	1826	Piano, etude	rev. as S. 137/1
136/2	A8/2	(Allegro non molto)	pf	A minor	1826	Piano, etude	rev. as S. 137/2
136/3	A8/3	(Allegro sempre legato)	pf	F major	1826	Piano, etude	rev. as S. 137/3
136/4	A8/4	(Allegretto)	pf	D minor	1826	Piano, etude	rev. as S. 137/4
136/5	A8/5	(Moderato)	pf	B♭ major	1826	Piano, etude	rev. as S. 137/5
136/6	A8/6	(Molto agitato)	pf	G minor	1826	Piano, etude	rev. as S. 137/6
136/7	A8/7	(Allegretto con molto espressione)	pf	E♭ major	1826	Piano, etude	rev. as S. 137/11
136/8	A8/8	(Allegro con spirito)	pf	C minor	1826	Piano, etude	rev. as S. 137/8
136/9	A8/9	(Allegro grazioso)	pf	A♭ major	1826	Piano, etude	rev. as S. 137/9
136/10	A8/10	(Moderato)	pf	F minor	1826	Piano, etude	rev. as S. 137/10
136/11	A8/11	(Allegro grazioso)	pf	D♭ major	1826	Piano, etude	
136/12	A8/12	(Allegro non troppo)	pf	B♭ minor	1826	Piano, etude	rev. as S. 137/12
137	A39	Grandes études:	pf		1837	Piano, etude	based on S. 136; rev. as S. 139
137/1	A39/1	(Presto)	pf	C major	1837	Piano, etude	based on S. 136/1; rev. as S. 139/1
137/2	A39/2	(Molto vivace)	pf	A minor	1837	Piano, etude	based on S. 136/2; rev. as S. 139/2
137/3	A39/3	(Poco adagio)	pf	F major	1837	Piano, etude	based on S. 136/3; rev. as S. 139/3
137/4	A39/4	(Allegro patetico)	pf	D minor	1837	Piano, etude	based on S. 136/4; rev. as S. 138, S. 139/4
137/5	A39/5	(Egualmente)	pf	B♭ major	1837	Piano, etude	based on S. 136/5; rev. as S. 139/5
137/6	A39/6	(Largo patetico)	pf	G minor	1837	Piano, etude	based on S. 136/6; rev. as S. 139/6
137/7	A39/7	(Allegro deciso)	pf	E♭ major	1837	Piano, etude	rev. as S. 139/7
137/8	A39/8	(Presto strepitoso)	pf	C minor	1837	Piano, etude	based on S. 136/8; rev. as S. 139/8
137/9	A39/9	(Andantino)	pf	A♭ major	1837	Piano, etude	based on S. 136/9; rev. as S. 139/9
137/10	A39/10	(Presto molto agitato)	pf	F minor	1837	Piano, etude	based on S. 136/10; rev. as S. 139/10
137/11	A39/11	(Lento assai)	pf	D♭ major	1837	Piano, etude	based on S. 136/7; rev. as S. 139/11
137/12	A39/12	(Andantino)	pf	B♭ minor	1837	Piano, etude	based on S. 136/12; rev. as S. 139/12
138	A172/4	Mazeppa	pf	D minor	1840	Piano, etude	based on S. 137/4; rev. as S. 139/4
139	A172	Études d'exécution transcendante (12 Transcendental Etudes):	pf		1851	Piano, etude	based on S. 137
139/1	A172/1	Preludio	pf	C major	1851	Piano, etude	based on S. 137/1
139/2	A172/2	[Fusées] (Molto vivace)	pf	A minor	1851	Piano, etude	based on S. 137/2
139/3	A172/3	Paysage	pf	F major	1851	Piano, etude	based on S. 137/3
139/4	A172/4	Mazeppa	pf	D minor	1851	Piano, etude	based on S. 137/4, S. 138
139/5	A172/5	Feux-follets (Irrlichter)	pf	B♭ major	1851	Piano, etude	based on S. 137/5
139/6	A172/6	Vision	pf	G minor	1851	Piano, etude	based on S. 137/6
139/7	A172/7	Eroica	pf	E♭ major	1851	Piano, etude	based on S. 137/7
139/8	A172/8	Wilde Jagd	pf	C minor	1851	Piano, etude	based on S. 137/8
139/9	A172/9	Ricordanza	pf	A♭ major	1851	Piano, etude	based on S. 137/9
139/10	A172/10	[Appassionata] (Allegro agitato molto)	pf	F minor	1851	Piano, etude	based on S. 137/10
139/11	A172/11	Harmonies du soir	pf	D♭ major	1851	Piano, etude	based on S. 137/11; later version of introduction, see S. 166o
139/12	A172/12	Chasse-neige	pf	B♭ minor	1851	Piano, etude	based on S. 137/12
140	A52	Études d'exécution transcendante d'après Paganini:	pf		1838	Piano, etude	based on themes from 24 Caprices for Solo Violin, Op. 1 and Violin Concerto No.2, Op. 7 by Niccolò Paganini; 1st version of S. 141
140/1	A52/1	Tremolo	pf	G minor	1838	Piano, etude	1st version of S. 141/1; with ossia passage by Schumann
140/2	A52/2	Octave	pf	E♭ major	1838	Piano, etude	1st version of S. 141/2
140/3	A52/3	Campanella	pf	A♭ minor	1838	Piano, etude	1st version of S. 141/3
140/4a	A52/4a	Arpeggio	pf	E major	1838	Piano, etude	1st version S. 141/4
140/4b	A52/4b	Arpeggio	pf	E major	1838	Piano, etude	1st version S. 141/4
140/5	A52/5	La chasse	pf	E major	1838	Piano, etude	1st version of S. 141/5
140/6	A52/6	Tema con Variazioni	pf	A minor	1838	Piano, etude	1st version of S. 141/6
141	A173	Grandes études de Paganini:	pf		1851	Piano, etude	based on themes from 24 Caprices for Solo Violin, Op. 1 and Violin Concerto No.2, Op. 7 by Niccolò Paganini; 2nd version of S. 140
141/1	A173/1	Preludio (Andante). Etude (Non troppo lento)	pf	G minor	1851	Piano, etude	2nd version of S. 140/1
141/2	A173/2	(Andante)	pf	E♭ major	1851	Piano, etude	2nd version of S. 140/2
141/3	A173/3	La campanella (Allegretto)	pf	G♯ minor	1851	Piano, etude	2nd version of S. 140/3
141/4	A173/4	(Vivo)	pf	E major	1851	Piano, etude	3rd version of S. 140/4a, S. 140/4b
141/5	A173/5	(Allegretto)	pf	E major	1851	Piano, etude	2nd version of S. 140/5
141/6	A173/6	(Quasi presto)	pf	A minor	1851	Piano, etude	2nd version of S. 140/6
141/6a	—	Album Leaf ("Introduction to the Grande Étude de Paganini No 6")	pf		1884	Piano, etude	renumbered from S. 141/6bis
142	A63a	Morceau de salon (Étude de perfectionnement)	pf	E minor	1840	Piano, etude	1st version of S. 143
143	A63b	Ab irato (Étude de perfectionnement)	pf	E minor	1852	Piano, etude	2nd version of S. 142
144	A118	3 Études de concert (3):	pf		1845–49	Piano, etude	
144/1	A118/1	Il lamento	pf	A♭ major	1845–49	Piano, etude	
144/2	A118/2	La leggierezza	pf	F minor	1845–49	Piano, etude	
144/3	A118/3	Un sospiro	pf	D♭ major	1845–49	Piano, etude	
144/3a	A118/3	Two additional cadenzas to Un Sospiro	pf	D♭ major	1848?	Piano, etude	renumbered from S. 144/3bis
145	A218	Konzertetüden (Concert-Studies) (2):	pf		1862	Piano, etude	
145/1	A218/1	Waldesrauschen (Forest Murmurs)	pf	D♭ major	1862	Piano, etude	
145/2	A218/2	Gnomenreigen (Gnomes' Round Dance)	pf	F♯ minor–F♯ major	1862	Piano, etude	
146	A242	Technische Studien (Technical Studies)	pf		1868–73	Piano, etude	68 studies in 3 books
147–208		===== Various original works =====					
147	A1	Variation on a Waltz by Diabelli (Variation über einen Walzer von Diabelli)	pf	C minor	1822	Piano, original	contribution to the album Vaterländischer Künstlerverein
147a#	—	Variationen über Romanze aus Joseph von Méhul	pf			Piano (not original)	spurious (by Franz Xaver Wolfgang Mozart); see S. 697
148	A3	Variations (8)	pf	A♭ major	1824	Piano, original	published as Op. 1
149	A4	Variations brillantes sur un thème de Rossini (7)	pf		1824	Piano, original	published as Op. 2; based on 'Ah, come nascondere la fiamma' from Ermione by Gioachino Rossini
150	A5	Impromptu brillant sur des thèmes de Rossini et Spontini	pf		1824	Piano, original	published as Op. 3; using themes from Armida and La donna del lago by Gioachino Rossini, and Fernand Cortez and Olimpie by Gaspare Spontini
151	A6	Allegro di bravura	pf	E♭ minor	1824–25	Piano, original	published as Op. 4/1
151a	—	Adagio non troppo	pf		1824?	Piano, original	
152	A7	Rondo di bravura	pf	E minor	1824–25	Piano, original	published as Op. 4/2
152a	—	Klavierstück	pf	A♭ major	1824–27?	Piano, original	
153	A9	Scherzo (Allegro molto quasi presto)	pf	G minor	1827	Piano, original	
153a	Q3	Grand solo caractèristique d'apropos une chansonette de Panseron	pf		1830–32	Piano, original	formerly S. 754a; unpublished (in private collection)
154	A18	Harmonies poétiques et religieuses	pf		1833–34	Piano, original	1st version of S. 172a/8, S. 173/4
155	A19	Apparitions	pf		1834	Piano, original	
155/1	A19/1	(Senza lentezza quasi Allegretto)	pf	F♯ major	1834	Piano, original	
155/2	A19/2	(Vivamanete)	pf	A minor	1834	Piano, original	
155/3	A19/3	Fantaisie sur une valse de François Schubert (Molto agitato ed appassionato)	pf		1834	Piano, original	based on No.33 of 36 Originaltänze, D. 365 by Franz Schubert
155a	A27a	Airs Suisses (3)	pf		1835–36	Piano, original	published as Op. 10; 1st version of S. 156/17–19, S. 156a
155a/1	A27a/1	Improvisata sur le Ranz des vaches (Départ pour les Alpes)	pf		1835–36	Piano, original	1st version of S. 156/17, S. 156a/1
155a/2	A27a/2	Nocturne sur le Chant Montagnard	pf		1835–36	Piano, original	1st version of S. 156/18, S. 156a/2
155a/3	A27a/3	Rondeau sur le Ranz des chèvres	pf		1835–36	Piano, original	1st version of S. 156/19, S. 156a/3
156	A40a	Album d'un voyageur I. Impressions et Poésies	pf		1837–38	Piano, original	
156/1	A40a/1	Lyon	pf	C major	1837–38	Piano, original	
156/2	A40a/2a	Le lac de Wallenstadt	pf	A♭ major	1837–38	Piano, original	1st version of S. 160/2
156/3	A40a/2b	Au bord d'une source	pf	A♭ major	1837–38	Piano, original	1st version of S. 160/4, S. 160/4a
156/4	A40a/3	Les cloches de G[enève]	pf	B major	1837–38	Piano, original	1st version of S. 160/9
156/5	A40a/4	Vallée d'Obermann	pf	E minor	1837–38	Piano, original	1st version of S. 160/6
156/6	A40a/5	La chapelle de Guilaume Tell	pf	C major	1837–38	Piano, original	1st version of S. 160/1
156/7	A40a/6	Psaume (de l'église à Genève)	pf	F major	1837–38	Piano, original	
	A40b	Album d'un voyageur II. Fleurs mélodiques des Alpes	pf	C major	1837–38	Piano, original	
156/8	A40b/1	(Allegro)	pf	C major	1837–38	Piano, original	
156/9	A40b/2	(Lento– Allegro vivace)	pf	E minor–G major	1837–38	Piano, original	1st version of S. 160/8
156/10	A40b/3	(Allegro pastorale)	pf	G major	1837–38	Piano, original	1st version of S. 160/3
156/11	A40b/4	(Andante con sentimento– Allegretto)	pf	G major	1837–38	Piano, original	
156/12	A40b/5	(Andante molto espressivo)	pf	G minor	1837–38	Piano, original	
156/13	A40b/6	(Allegro moderato)	pf	E major	1837–38	Piano, original	
156/14	A40b/7	(Allegretto)	pf	A♭ major	1837–38	Piano, original	
156/15	A40b/8	(Allegretto)	pf	D♭ major	1837–38	Piano, original	
156/16	A40b/9	(Andantino con molto sentimento)	pf	G major	1837–38	Piano, original	
	A40c	Album d'un voyageur III. Paraphrases	pf		1837–38	Piano, original	2nd version of S. 155a, S. 156a
156/17	A40c/1	Ranz de vaches (Montée aux Alpes: Improvisata)	pf	G major	1837–38	Piano, original	2nd version of S. 155a/1, S. 156a/1
156/18	A40c/2	Un soir dans les montagnes (Nocturne pastoral)	pf	C major	1837–38	Piano, original	2nd version of S. 155a/2, S. 156a/2
156/19	A40c/3	Ranz de chèvres de F. Huber (Allegro finale)	pf		1837–38	Piano, original	2nd version of S. 155a/3, S. 156a/3
156a	A27b	Morceaux suisses (3):	pf		1876–77	Piano, original	3rd version of S. 155a, S. 156/17–19
156a/1	A27b/1	Ranz de vaches (Mélodie de Ferdinand Huber, avec variations)	pf		1876–77	Piano, original	3rd version of S. 155a/1, S. 156/17
156a/2	A27b/2	Un soir dans la montagne (Mélodie d'Ernest Knop)	pf		1876–77	Piano, original	3rd version of S. 155a/2, S. 156/18
156a/3	A27b/3	Ranz de chèvres (Rondeau)	pf		1876–77	Piano, original	3rd version of S. 155a/3, S. 156/19
157	A21	Fantaisie romantique sur deux mélodies suisses	pf		1835–36	Piano, original	related to S. 160/8
157a	A55/1	Sposalizio	pf	E major	1838–39	Piano, original	1st version of S. 161/1
157b	A55/2	Il penseroso	pf		1839	Piano, original	1st version of S. 161/2
157c	A55/3	Canzonetta del Salvator Rosa	pf		1838–39	Piano, original	1st version of S. 161/3
157d	A101	Quasi Mazurka	pf		1843	Piano, original	
158	A102	Sonetti di Petrarca (3):	pf		1843–46	Piano, original	arrs. of S. 270a
158/1	A102/2	Sonetto CIV ("Pace non trovo")	pf	E major	1843–46	Piano, original	arr. of S. 270a/1; 1st version of S. 161/5
158/2	A102/1	Sonetto XLVII ("Benedetto sia il giorno")	pf	D♭ major	1843–46	Piano, original	arr. of S. 270a/2; 1st version of S. 161/4
158/3	A102/3	Sonetto CXXIII ("I' vidi in terra")	pf	A♭ major	1843–46	Piano, original	arr. of S. 270a/3; 1st version of S. 161/6
158a	A55/7	Paralipomènes à la Divina Commedia (Fantaisie symphonique)	pf		1839	Piano, original	1st version of S. 158b, S. 158c, S. 161/7
158b	A55/7	Prolégomènes à la Divina Commedia (Fantaisie symphonique)	pf		1839	Piano, original	2nd version of S. 158a, S. 158c, S. 161/7
158c	A55/7	Après une lecture du Dante (Fantasia quasi Sonata)	pf		1839	Piano, original	3rd version of S. 158a, S. 158b, S. 161/7
158d	—	Adagio	pf	C major	1841	Piano, original	fragment from S. 158c? may also have been formerly S. 998?
159	A53	Venezia e Napoli	pf		1840	Piano, original	1st version of S. 162
159/1	A53/1	(Lento)	pf	C minor	1840	Piano, original	
159/2	A53/2	(Allegro)	pf	C major	1840	Piano, original	
159/3	A53/3	(Andante placido)	pf	F♯ major	1840	Piano, original	based on the popular song La biondina in gondoletta by Giovanni Battista Peruchini; 1st version of S. 162/1
159/4	A53/4	Tarantelles napolitaines	pf	G minor	1840	Piano, original	based on a tarantella by Guillaume Louis Cottrau; 1st version of S. 162/3
160	A159	Années de pèlerinage I (Première année: Suisse)	pf		1848–55	Piano, original	
160/1	A159/1	Chapelle de Guilaume Tell	pf	C major	1848–55	Piano, original	2nd version of S. 156/5
160/2	A159/2	Au lac de Wallenstadt	pf	A♭ major	1848–55	Piano, original	2nd version of S. 156/2
160/3	A159/3	Pastorale	pf	E major	1848–55	Piano, original	2nd version of S. 156/10
160/4	A159/4	Au bord d'une source	pf	A♭ major	1848–55	Piano, original	2nd version of S. 156/3, S. 160/4a
160/4a	A159/4	Au bord d'une source	pf	A♭ major?	1863	Piano, original	3rd version of S. 156/3, S. 160/4; renumbered from S. 160/4bis
160/5	A159/5	Orage	pf	C minor	1848–55	Piano, original	
160/6	A159/6	Vallée d'Obermann	pf	E minor	1848–55	Piano, original	2nd version of S. 156/5; arr. for vn vc pf by Eduard Lassen and Liszt as S. 378a, S. 378b, S. 378c
160/7	A159/7	Eglogue	pf	A♭ major	1848–55	Piano, original	
160/8	A159/8	Le mal du pays (Heimweh)	pf	E minor	1848–54	Piano, original	
160/9	A159/9	Les cloches de Genève	pf	B major	1848–55	Piano, original	2nd version of S. 156/4
161	A55	Années de pèlerinage II (Deuxième année: Italie)	pf		1846–49	Piano, original	for supplement see S. 162
161/1	A55/1	Sposalizio	pf	E major	1849	Piano, original	2nd version of S. 157a; rev. for vv org/harm as S. 60
161/2	A55/2	Il penseroso	pf	C♯ minor	1846–49	Piano, original	2nd version of S. 157b
161/3	A55/3	Canzonetta del Salvator Rosa	pf	A major	1846	Piano, original	2nd version of S. 157c
161/4	A55/4	Sonetto 47 del Petrarca	pf	D♭ major	1846	Piano, original	2nd version of S. 158/2
161/5	A55/5	Sonetto 104 del Petrarca	pf	E major	1846	Piano, original	2nd version of S. 158/1
161/6	A55/6	Sonetto 123 del Petrarca	pf	A♭ major	1846	Piano, original	2nd version of S. 158/3
161/7	A55/7	Après une lecture du Dante (Fantasia quasi Sonata).	pf		1849	Piano, original	4th version of S. 158a, S. 158b, S. 158c
162	A197	Années de pèlerinage II, Supplément (Supplément: Venezia e Napoli)	pf		1859	Piano, original	2nd version of S. 159
162/1	A197/1	Gondoliera. Canzone del Cavaliere Peruchini ("La biondina in gondoletta")	pf		1859	Piano, original	2nd version of S. 159/3; based on La biondina in gondoletta by Giovanni Battista Peruchini
162/2	A197/2	Canzone ('Nessun maggior dolore")	pf	E♭ minor	1859	Piano, original	based on the theme of the Gondolier's song from Act III of Otello by Gioachino Rossini
162/3	A197/3	Tarantella da Guillaume Louis Cottrau	pf	G minor	1859	Piano, original	2nd version of S. 159/4; based on a tarantella by Guillaume Louis Cottrau
162a/1	A283/1	Den Schutz-Engeln (Angelus! Prière à l'ange gardien)	pf		1877	Piano, original	1st version of S. 162a/1a, S. 162a/2, S. 162a/3, S. 162a/4, S. 163/1
162a/1a	A283/1	Aux anges gardiens (Den Schutz-Engeln)	pf		1877	Piano, original	2nd version of S. 162a/1, S. 162a/2, S. 162a/3, S. 162a/4, S. 163/1; renumbered from S. 162a/1bis
162a/2	A283/1	Den Schutz-Engeln (Angelus! Prière à l'ange gardien)	pf		1880	Piano, original	3rd version of S. 162a/1, S. 162a/1a, S. 162a/3, S. 162a/4, S. 163/1
162a/3	A283/1	Den Schutz-Engeln (Angelus! Prière à l'ange gardien)	pf		1880	Piano, original	4th version of S. 162a/1, S. 162a/1a, S. 162a/2, S. 162a/4, S. 163/1
162a/4	A283/1	Den Schutz-Engeln (Angelus! Prière à l'ange gardien)	pf		1880	Piano, original	5th version of S. 162a/1, S. 162a/1a, S. 162a/2, S. 162a/3, S. 163/1
162b	A283/3	Den Cypressen der Villa d'Este	pf		1872	Piano, original	1st version of S. 163/3
162c	A283/5	Sunt lacrymae rerum	pf		1877	Piano, original	1st version of S. 163/5, S. 162d
162e	A283/6	En mémoire de Maximilian I	pf		1867	Piano, original	1st version of S. 163/6
162d	A283/5	Sunt lacrymae rerum (in ungarischer Weise)	pf		1877	Piano, original	2nd version of S. 162c, S. 163/5
162f	A283/7	Postludium (Sursum Corda)	pf		1877	Piano, original	1st version of S. 163/7
163	A283	Années de pèlerinage III (Troisième année)	pf		1877–82	Piano, original	
163/1	A283/1	Angelus! Prière aux anges gardiens	pf	E major	1882	Piano, original	6th version of S. 162a/1, S. 162a/1a, S. 162a/2, S. 162a/3, S. 162a/4; arr. for harm as S. 672c, for 2vn va vc as S. 378, for str/(2vn va vc) as S. 362a
163/2	A283/2	Aux cyprès de la Villa d'Este (Thrénodie I)	pf		1877	Piano, original	
163/3	A283/3	Aux cyprès de la Villa d'Este (Thrénodie II)	pf	E minor	1877	Piano, original	2nd version of S. 162b
163/4	A283/4	Les jeux d'eaux à la Ville d'Este	pf	F♯ major	1877	Piano, original	
163/5	A283/5	Sunt lacrymae rerum, en mode hongrois	pf		1882	Piano, original	3rd version of S. 162c, S. 162d
163/6	A283/6	Marche funèbre	pf		1867	Piano, original	2nd version of S. 162e
163/7	A283/7	Sursum corda (Erhebet eure Herzen)	pf	E major	1877	Piano, original	2nd version of S. 162f
163a/1	—	Album Leaf (Allegro vivace quasi presto)	pf	F♯ minor	1828	Piano, original	
163a/2	—	Andantino ("pour Emile et Charlotte Loudon")	pf	E♭ major	1828	Piano, original	
163b	—	Album Leaf ("Ah! vous dirai-je, Maman")	pf	A♭ major	1833	Piano, original	
163c	—	Album Leaf ("Pressburg")	pf	C minor	1839	Piano, original	
163d	—	Album Leaf ("Leipzig")	pf	E major	1840	Piano, original	exists in two versions
163e	—	Album Leaf ("Quasi mazurek in C major")	pf	C major	1843	Piano, original	
164	A66	Albumblatt ("Feuille d'album" No.1)	pf	E major	1840	Piano, original	based on S. 210
164a	—	Album Leaf ("Vienna")	pf	E major	1840	Piano, original	
164b	—	Album Leaf ("Leipzig")	pf	E♭ major	1840	Piano, original	
164c	—	Album Leaf ("Exeter Preludio")	pf		1840	Piano, original	
164d	—	Album Leaf ("Detmold)	pf	E major	1841	Piano, original	
164e	—	Three Album Leaves ("Magyar")	pf		1840–41	Piano, original	
164e/1	—	Album Leaf ("Magyar")	pf	B♭ minor	1840	Piano, original	1st version of S. 164e/2; themes re-used in S. 242/11
164e/2	—	Album Leaf ("Magyar")	pf	B♭ minor	1840	Piano, original	2nd version of S. 164e/1; themes re-used in S. 242/11
164e/3	—	Album Leaf ("Magyar")	pf	D♭ major	1841	Piano, original	
164f	—	Album Leaf ("Rákóczi-Marsch")	pf	A minor	1841	Piano, original	2nd version of S. 242a (based on)
164g	—	Album Leaf ("Berlin Preludio")	pf	C major	1842	Piano, original	
164h	—	Album Leaf	pf	D major	1840–45?	Piano, original	
164j	—	Album Leaf ("Preludio")	pf		1842	Piano, original	
164k	—	Album Leaf ("Moderato in D♭ major")	pf	D♭ major	1842	Piano, original	
164l	—	Album Leaf ("Adagio — religioso in C major")	pf	C major	1825	Piano, original	
165	A104	Feuilles d'album	pf	A♭ major	1844	Piano, original	
166	A83	Albumblatt in Walzerform	pf	A major	1842	Piano, original	
166a	—	Album Leaf	pf	E major	1843	Piano, original	cataloguing mistake?; maybe 1st version of 166a (below)
166a	—	Album Leaf	pf	A major	1870	Piano, original	cataloguing mistake?; maybe 2nd version of 166a (above)
166b	—	Album Leaf ("Portugal")	pf	A♭ major	1845	Piano, original	
166c	—	Album Leaf	pf	A♭ major	1845	Piano, original	
166d	—	Album Leaf ("Lyon Prélude")	pf		1844	Piano, original	
166e	—	Album Leaf ("Prélude omnitonique")	pf		1844	Piano, original	
166f	—	Album Leaf ("Braunschweig Preludio")	pf	F♯ major?	1844	Piano, original	
166g	—	Album Leaf ("Serenade")	pf	A minor	1840	Piano, original	
166h	—	Album Leaf ("Andante religioso in G major")	pf	G major	1846	Piano, original	1st version of S. 166j
166j	—	Album Leaf ("Andante religiosamente in G major")	pf	G major	1846	Piano, original	2nd version of S. 166h
166k	—	Album Leaf ("Friska")	pf	A major	1845–49?	Piano, original	
166l/1	R3	Album Leaf	pf	A♭ major	1840s	Piano, original	
166l/2	—	Album Leaf	pf	G minor	1840s?	Piano, original	
166m	A135	Albumblätter für Prinzessin Marie von Sayn-Wittgenstein (Album-Leaves for Princess Marie von Sayn-Wittgenstein)	pf		1847	Piano, original	
166m/1	A135/1	Lilie (Andantino)	pf	C major	1847	Piano, original	
166m/2	A135/2	Hryc	pf		1847	Piano, original	
166m/3	A135/3	Mazurek: Gdy w czystem polu (Mazurka: When on the Clean Earth)	pf	A major	1847	Piano, original	
166m/4	A135/4	Krakowiak	pf	F major	1847	Piano, original	
166n	A134	Album Leaf ("Freudvoll und leidvoll")	pf		1847	Piano, original	partial arr. of S. 280
166o	—	Album Leaf ("Langsam in C♯ minor")	pf	C♯ minor	1876	Piano, original	uses themes from S. 139/11
166p	—	Album Leaf ("Andantino in A♭ major")	pf	A♭ major	1847	Piano, original	
166q	—	Album Leaf	pf	G major	1847	Piano, original	
166r	—	Two Album Leaves ("Purgatorio")	pf		1857?	Piano, original	
166r/1	—	Album Leaf ("Purgatorio")	pf	B minor	1857	Piano, original	
166r/2	—	Album Leaf ("Aus dem Purgatorio des Dante-Sinfonie")	pf	B minor	1857?	Piano, original	
166s	—	Album Leaf	pf	A major	1870	Piano, original	
167#	—	Feuille d'album No.2				Piano, original	see S. 534/2a
167a#	—	Einleitung und Schlußtakte zu Tausigs dritter Valse-Caprice				Piano, original	see S. 571a
167b	A75	Miniatur Lieder	pf		1840–49	Piano, original	unpublished; score inaccessible (in private collection?)
167c	—	Album Leaf (Poco adagio)	pf		1860?	Piano, original	from the Agnus Dei of Beethoven's Missa Solemnis
167d	—	Album Leaf	pf		1860	Piano, original	from S. 98
167e	—	Album Leaf	pf		1861	Piano, original	from S. 106
167f	—	Album Leaf ("Dante Symphony progression")	pf	G major	1860?	Piano, original	based on material from S. 109
167g	—	Album Leaf ("Vivace ma non troppo in D♭ major")	pf	D♭ major	1835	Piano, original	
167h	—	Album Leaf	pf		1860–69?	Piano, original	
167j	—	Album Leaf ("Fugue chromatique – Allegro in G minor")	pf	G minor	1844	Piano, original	
167k	—	Album Leaf	pf	E♭ major	1840	Piano, original	based on S. 219 and S. 219a
167l	—	Album Leaf ("Agitato in G major")	pf	G major	1849	Piano, original	based on S. 576b, S. 577/1, S. 577/1a, and S. 577/2
167m	—	Album Leaf ("Aus den [Erster] Mephisto-Walzer, Episode aus Lenaus Faust – Der Tanz in der Dorfschenke")	pf		1859 or later	Piano, original	possible intended for S. 216, S. 216b, S. 514, or S. 515?
167n	—	Album Leaf ("Allegretto in A major")	pf	A major	1842	Piano, original	
167o	—	Album Leaf ("Tempo di marcia in E♭ major")	pf	E♭ major	1845	Piano, original	themes re-used in S. 227
167p	—	Album Leaf ("Larghetto in D♭ major")	pf	D♭ major	1883	Piano, original	on a Henselt Concerto
167q	—	Album Leaf ("Schlusschor des entfesselten Prometheus – Andante solenne in D♭ major")	pf	D♭ major	1883	Piano, original	
167r	—	Album Leaf ("Andante in E♭ major")	pf	E♭ major	1850s	Piano, original	
167s	—	Album Leaf ("Lyon")	pf	C major	1839	Piano, original	
167t	—	Album Leaf	pf	E major	1853	Piano, original	based on S. 173/10
168/1	A94	Élégie sur des motifs du Prince Louis Ferdinand de Prusse	pf	A♭ major	1842–43	Piano, original	1st version of S. 168/2
168/2	A94	Élégie sur des motifs du Prince Louis Ferdinand de Prusse	pf	A♭ major	1851	Piano, original	2nd version of S. 168/1
168a	A145	Andante amoroso	pf		1847?	Piano, original	from S. 395?
168b	—	Pensées (Nocturne)	pf	A major	1845	Piano, original	
169	A148	Romance "O pourquoi donc"	pf	E minor	1848	Piano, original	based on S. 301a; rev. as S. 527
170	A117	Ballade No.1 (Le chant du croisé)	pf	D♭ major	1848–49	Piano, original	2nd version of S. 171d/4
170a	A181	Ballade No.2	pf	B minor	1853	Piano, original	1st version of S. 171
171	A181	Ballade No.2	pf	B minor	1853	Piano, original	2nd version of S. 170a
171a	A111a/1	Consolations:	pf		1844–48	Piano, original	1st version of S. 172
171a/1	A111a/1	(Andante con moto)	pf	E major	1844–48	Piano, original	1st version of S. 172/1
171a/2	A111a/2	(Un poco più mosso)	pf	E major	1844–48	Piano, original	1st version of S. 172/2
171a/3	A111a/3	(Lento, quasi recitativo)	pf	E major	1844–48	Piano, original	theme re-used in S. 243b
171a/4	A111a/4	(Quasi adagio; cantabile con devozione)	pf	D♭ major	1844–48	Piano, original	1st version of S. 172/4
171a/5	A111a/5	(Andantino)	pf	E major	1844–48	Piano, original	1st version of S. 172/5
171a/6	A111a/6	(Allegretto)	pf	E major	1844–48	Piano, original	1st version of S. 172/6
171b	—	Album Leaf (Consolation No.1)	pf		1849–50	Piano, original	originally intended for S. 172
171c	—	Prière d'un enfant à son réveil	pf		1840	Piano, original	1st version of S. 172a/7, S. 173/6; theme used in S. 19/1
171d	—	Préludes et Harmonies poétiques et religieuses (8):	pf		1845–47	Piano, original	
171d/1	—	[untitled]	pf	E♭ major	1845–47	Piano, original	1st version of S. 172a/11 and S. 173/3
171d/2	—	Languer	pf	C minor	1845–47	Piano, original	
171d/3	—	[untitled]	pf	E major	1845–47	Piano, original	
171d/4	—	Dernière illusion	pf	D♭ major	1845–47	Piano, original	incomplete; 1st version of S. 170
171d/5	—	[untitled]	pf	G♭ major	1845–47	Piano, original	
171d/6	—	Attente	pf	A major	1845–47	Piano, original	incomplete
171d/7	—	Alternative	pf	E major	1845–47	Piano, original	
171d/8	—	M.K.	pf	D♭ major	1845–47	Piano, original	incomplete
171e	A61/4	Litanies de Marie	pf	E major	1846–47	Piano, original	formerly S. 695a; 1st version of S. 172a/4
172	A111b	Consolations (Pensées poétiques) (6):	pf		1849–50	Piano, original	2nd version of S. 171a
172/1	A111b/1	(Andante con moto)	pf	E major	1849–50	Piano, original	2nd version of S. 171a/1; arr. for vc pf by Liszt and Jules Deswert as S. 382a/1
172/2	A111b/2	(Un poco più mosso)	pf	E major	1849–50	Piano, original	2nd version of S. 171a/2
172/3	A111b/3	(Lento placido)	pf	D♭ major	1849–50	Piano, original	arr. for org/harm as S. 672d/1
172/4	A111b/4	(Quasi Adagio)	pf	D♭ major	1849–50	Piano, original	2nd version of S. 171a/4; arr. for org/harm by Liszt and Alexander Wilhelm Gottschalg as S. 672d/2; arr. for vc pf/org/harm by Liszt and Deswert as S. 382a/2
172/5	A111b/5	(Andantino)	pf	E major	1849–50	Piano, original	2nd version of S. 171a/5; arr. for org/harm by Liszt and Gottschalg as S. 672d/3
172/6	A111b/6	(Allegretto sempre cantabile)	pf	E major	1849–50	Piano, original	2nd version of S. 171a/6; arr. for org/harm as S. 672d/4
172a	A61	Harmonies poétiques et religieuses (12):	pf		1840–47	Piano, original	1st version of S. 173
172a/1	A61/1	Elevez-vous voix	pf	E major	1840–47	Piano, original	1st version of S. 172c, S. 173/1
172a/2	A61/2	Hymne de la nuit	pf	E major	1840–47	Piano, original	1st version of S. 173a/1
172a/3	A61/3	Hymne du matin	pf	B major	1840–47	Piano, original	1st version of S. 173a/2
172a/4	A61/4	Litanies de Marie	pf	E major	1840–47	Piano, original	2nd version of S. 171e
172a/5	A61/5	Miserere	pf	E minor	1840–47	Piano, original	1st version of S. 173/8
172a/6	A61/6	Pater noster (d'après la Psalmodie de l'Eglise)	pf	C major	1840–47	Piano, original	1st version of S. 173/5; adapted for mch as S. 21
172a/7	A61/7	Hymne de l'enfant à son réveil	pf	A♭ major	1840–47	Piano, original	2nd version of S. 171c, S. 173/6
172a/8	A61/8	Prose des morts (De profundis)	pf		1840–47	Piano, original	2nd version of S. 154, S. 173/4
172a/9	A61/9	La lampe du temple	pf	G minor	1840–47	Piano, original	1st version of S. 173/9
172a/10	A61/10	[Hymn]	pf	E♭ major	1840–47	Piano, original	
172a/11	A61/11	Benediction (Prelude)	pf	E♭ major	1840–47	Piano, original	2nd version of S. 171d/1 and S. 173/3
172a/12	A61/12	Ave Maria	pf		1840–47	Piano, original	1st version of S. 173/2; now lost
172b	A142	Stabat Mater	pf		1847	Piano, original	formerly S. 579/3
172c	A61/1	Invocation	pf	E major	1847	Piano, original	2nd version of S. 172a/1, S. 173/1
173	A158	Harmonies poétiques et religieuses (10):	pf		1848–53	Piano, original	2nd version of S. 172a
173/1	A158/1	Invocation	pf	E major	1848–51	Piano, original	3rd version of S. 172a/1, S. 172c
173/2	A158/2	Ave Maria	pf	B♭ major	1842	Piano, original	2nd version of S. 172a/12
173/3	A158/3	Bénédiction de Dieu dans la solitude	pf	F♯ major	1851	Piano, original	3rd version of S. 171d/1 and S. 172a/11
173/4	A158/4	Pensée des morts	pf		1851	Piano, original	3rd version of S. 154, S. 172a/8
173/5	A158/5	Pater noster	pf	C major	1847	Piano, original	2nd version of S. 172a/6
173/6	A158/6	Hymne de l'enfant á son réveil	pf	A♭ major	1847	Piano, original	2nd version of S. 171c, S. 172a/7
173/7	A158/7	Funérailles	pf	F minor	1849	Piano, original	2nd version of S. 226a
173/8	A158/8	Miserere d'après Palestrina	pf	E minor	1851	Piano, original	2nd version of S. 172a/5
173/9	A158/9	Andante lagrimoso	pf	G♯ minor	1851	Piano, original	2nd version of S. 172a/9
173/10	A158/10	Cantique d'amour	pf	E major	1847	Piano, original	
173a	—	2 Hymnes:	pf		1847	Piano, original	
173a/1	A61/2	Hymne de la nuit	pf	E major	1847	Piano, original	2nd version of S. 172a/2
173a/2	A61/3	Hymne du matin	pf	B major	1847	Piano, original	2nd version of S. 172a/3
174	A186	Berceuse	pf	D♭ major	1854, 1862	Piano, original	2 versions
175	A219	Légendes (2):	pf		1863	Piano, original	
175/1	A219/1	St François d'Assise: la prédication aux oiseaux	pf	A major	1862–63	Piano, original	version for orch as S. 113a/1
175/2	A219/2	St François de Paule: marchant sur les flots	pf	E major	1862–63	Piano, original	simplified version as S. 175/2a; version for orch as S. 113a/2; for 2ten 2bass mch org/harm (+3 tbn timp) as S. 28
175/2a	A219/2	St François de Paule, marchant sur les flots	pf	E major?	1863	Piano, original	simplified version of S. 175/2; renumbered from S. 175/2bis
175a	A167	Grand Solo de concert	pf	E minor?	1849	Piano, original	unpublished; rev. as S. 176
176	A167	Grosses Konzertsolo	pf	E minor	1849–50	Piano, original	based on S. 175a; rev. for 2pf as S. 258/1, sketches for pf orch as S. 365
176a	—	Wilde Jagd – Scherzo	pf	D minor/B♭ major	1851	Piano, original	1st version of S. 177
177	A174	Scherzo und Marsch	pf	D minor and B♭ major	1851	Piano, original	2nd version of S. 176a
178	A179	Piano Sonata	pf	B minor	1852–53	Piano, original	
179	A198	Weinen, Klagen, Sorgen, Zagen	pf	F minor	1859	Piano, original	prelude based on a theme from the Weinen, Klagen, Sorgen, Zagen, BWV 12 by Johann Sebastian Bach; not related to S. 180
180	A214	Variationen über das Motiv von Bach	pf	F minor	1862	Piano, original	prelude based on themes from the Weinen, Klagen, Sorgen, Zagen, BWV 12 by Johann Sebastian Bach; not related to S. 179; arr. for org as S. 673
181	A290	Sarabande und Chaconne aus dem Singspiel Almira	pf	G minor	1879	Piano, original	after extracts from the Singspiel Almira by George Frideric Handel
182	A215	Ave Maria (Die Glocken von Rom)	pf	E major	1862	Piano, original	also known as Ave Maria für die große Klavierschule von Lebert und Stark
182a	—	Magnificat	pf	F major	1862	Piano, original	unpublished; 1st version of S. 183/1
183/1	A216/1	Alleluja	pf	F major	1862	Piano, original	2nd version of S. 182a
183/2	A216/2	Ave Maria d'Arcadelt	pf	F major	1862	Piano, original	based on Dietsch's adaptation of a madrigal by Arcadelt
184	A229	Urbi et Orbi (Bénédiction papale)	pf	C♯ minor	1864	Piano, original	
185	A226	Vexilla regis prodeunt (Kreuzes Hymne)	pf		1864	Piano, original	arr. for orch as S. 355
185a	A267	Weihnachtsbaum	pf		1873–74	Piano, original	1st version ("Paris manuscripts") of S. 186; arr. for pf4h as S. 612a
185a/1	A267/1	Psallite (Altes Weihnachten)	pf	F major	1873–74	Piano, original	1st version of S. 186/1; arr. for pf4h as S. 612a/1
185a/2	A267/2	O heilige Nacht!	pf	D minor	1873–74	Piano, original	1st version of S. 186/2; arr. for pf4h as S. 612a/2
185a/3	A267/3	Die Hirten an der Krippe ("In dulci jubilo")	pf	D♭ major	1873–74	Piano, original	1st version of S. 186/3; arr. for pf4h as S. 612a/3
185a/4	A267/4	Adeste fideles (gleichsam als Marsch der heiligen drei Könige)	pf	A major	1873–74	Piano, original	1st version of S. 186/4; arr. for pf4h as S. 612a/4
185a/5	A267/5	Scherzoso	pf	F major	1873–74	Piano, original	1st version of S. 186/5; arr. for pf4h as S. 612a/5
185a/6	A267/6	Réveille-Matin (Wecker)	pf		1873–74	Piano, original	1st version of S. 186/6; arr. for pf4h as S. 612a/6
185a/7	A267/7	Schlummerlied	pf	F♯ major	1873–74	Piano, original	1st version of S. 186/7, S. 186/7a; arr. for pf4h as S. 612a/7
185a/8	A267/8	(Alt-provenzalisches Noel)	pf	B minor	1873–74	Piano, original	1st version of S. 186/8; arr. for pf4h as S. 612a/8
185a/9	A267/9	(Abendglocken)	pf		1873–74	Piano, original	1st version of S. 186/9; arr. for pf4h as S. 612a/9
185a/10	A267/10	(Ehemals)	pf	F minor	1873–74	Piano, original	1st version of S. 186/10; arr. for pf4h as S. 612a/10
185a/11	A267/11	Ungarisch	pf	F minor	1873–74	Piano, original	1st version of S. 186/11; arr. for pf4h as S. 612a/11
185a/12	A267/12	Polnisch	pf	B♭ minor	1873–74	Piano, original	1st version of S. 186/12; arr. for pf4h as S. 612a/12
186	A267	Weihnachtsbaum	pf		1874–76	Piano, original	2nd version of S. 185a; arr. for pf4h as S. 613
186/1	A267/1	Altes Weihnachtslied (Psalite)	pf	F major	1874–76	Piano, original	2nd version of S. 185a/1; arr. for pf4h as S. 613/1
186/2	A267/2	O heilige Nacht!	pf	D minor	1874–76	Piano, original	2nd version of S. 185a/2; arr. for pf4h as S. 613/2; rev. for ten fch org/harm as S. 49
186/3	A267/3	Die Hirten an der Krippe ("In dulce jubilo")	pf	D♭ major	1874–76	Piano, original	2nd version of S. 185a/3; arr. for pf4h as S. 613/3
186/4	A267/4	Adeste fideles (Gleichsam als Marsch der heiligen drei Könige)	pf	A major	1874–76	Piano, original	2nd version of S. 185a/4; arr. for pf4h as S. 613/4
186/5	A267/5	Scherzoso (Man zündet die Kerzen des Baumes an)	pf	F major	1874–76	Piano, original	2nd version of S. 185a/5; arr. for pf4h as S. 613/5
186/6	A267/6	Carillon	pf		1874–76	Piano, original	2nd version of S. 185a/6; arr. for pf4h as S. 613/6
186/7	A267/7	Schlummerlied	pf	F♯ major	1874–76	Piano, original	2nd version of S. 185a/7, S. 186/7a; arr. for pf4h as S. 613/7
186/7a	A267/7	Schlummerlied	pf	F♯ major?	1882	Piano, original	3rd version of S. 185a/7, S. 186/7; version for Lachmund
186/8	A267/8	Altes provenzalisches Weihnachtslied	pf	B minor	1874–76	Piano, original	2nd version of S. 185a/8; arr. for pf4h as S. 613/8
186/9	A267/9	Abendglocken	pf		1874–76	Piano, original	2nd version of S. 185a/9; arr. for pf4h as S. 613/9
186/10	A267/10	Ehemals	pf	F minor	1874–76	Piano, original	2nd version of S. 185a/10; arr. for pf4h as S. 613/ 10
186/11	A267/11	Ungarisch	pf	F minor	1874–76	Piano, original	2nd version of S. 185a/11; arr. for pf4h as S. 613/11
186/12	A267/12	Polnisch	pf	B♭ minor	1874–76	Piano, original	2nd version of S. 185a/12; arr. for pf4h as S. 613/12
187	A278	Sancta Dorothea	pf	E major	1877	Piano, original	
187a	E28	Resignazione	pf/org	E major	1877	Piano, original	1st version of S. 187b
187b	E28	Resignazione	pf/org	E major	1881	Piano, original	2nd version of S. 187a
188	A300	In festo transfigurationis Domini nostri Jesu Christi	pf	C major	1880	Piano, original	
189	A234	Klavierstück No.1	pf	A♭ major	1866	Piano, original	
189a	A116	Klavierstück No.2	pf	A♭ major	1845	Piano, original	1st version of S. 189b
189b	A116	Klavierstück No.2	pf	D♭ major	1845 or later	Piano, original	2nd version of S. 189a; themes re-used in S. 170 and S. 171d/4
190	A241	La marquise de Blocqueville (Un portrait en musique)	pf		1869	Piano, original	1st movement is by Henri Herz, the second movement is by Francis Planté, and the third is by Liszt, and is based upon the two previous movements.
191	A256	Impromptu	pf	F♯ major	1872	Piano, original	
192	A233	Klavierstücke (5)	pf		1865–79	Piano, original	
192/1	A233/1	Sehr langsam	pf	E major	1865	Piano, original	
192/2	A233/2	Lento assai	pf	A♭ major	1865	Piano, original	
192/3	A233/3	Sehr langsam	pf	F♯ major	1873	Piano, original	
192/4	A233/4	Andantino	pf	F♯ major	1876	Piano, original	
192/5	A233/5	Sospiri! (Andante)	pf		1879	Piano, original	
193	—	Klavierstück	pf	F♯ major	1854	Piano, original	
194	A249	Mosonyis Grabgeleit (Mosonyi gyázmenete)	pf		1870	Piano, original	re-used as S. 205/7; arr. for 2pf as S. 756(?)
195	A279	Dem Andenken Petöfis	pf		1877	Piano, original	based on S. 349; arr. for pf4h as S. 614; same as S. 205/6
195a	A266	Schlummerlied im Grabe	pf		1874	Piano, original	rev. as S. 196
196	A266	Elegy No.1	pf		1874	Piano, original	based on S. 195a; arr. for pf4h as S. 612; for hp vc pf harm as S. 130a; for vc pf as S. 130b; for vn pf (+ harm) as S. 130c
196a	A277	Entwurf der Ramann-Elegie	pf		1877	Piano, original	1st version of S. 197
197	A277	Elegy No.2	pf		1877	Piano, original	2nd version of S. 196a; arr. for vc pf as S. 131, and for vn pf as S. 131a
197a	A295	Toccata	pf	C major	1879?	Piano, original	
197b	A272	Kaiser Wilhelm!	pf		1876	Piano, original	
198	A303	Wiegenlied (Chant du berceau)	pf		1881	Piano, original	
199	A305	Trübe Wolken (Nuages gris)	pf		1881	Piano, original	
199a	A319	Die Trauer-Gondel (La lugubre gondola)	pf		1882	Piano, original	1st version of S. 200/1, S. 200/2; incomplete sketch as S. 701k
200/1	A319a	La lugubre gondola (Die Trauer-Gondel)	pf		1882–83	Piano, original	2nd version of S. 199a, S. 200/2; arr. for vn pf as S. 134a
200/2	A319b	La lugubre gondola (Die Trauer-Gondel)	pf		1885	Piano, original	3rd version of S. 199a, S. 200/1; arr. for vc pf as S. 134
201	A320	R.W. – Venezia	pf		1883	Piano, original	
202	A321	Am Grabe Richard Wagners	pf		1883	Piano, original	arr. of S. 135
203	A322	Schlaflos! Frage und Antwort	pf		1883	Piano, original	
204	A280	Receuillement	pf		1877	Piano, original	
205	A335	Historische ungarische Bildnisse	pf		1885	Piano, original	1st version of S. 205a
205/1	A335/1	Stephan Széchenyi	pf		1885	Piano, original	same as S. 205a/1
205/2	A335/4	Joseph Eötvös	pf		1885	Piano, original	same as S. 205a/4
205/3	A335/5	Michael Vörösmarty	pf		1885	Piano, original	same as S. 205a/5
205/4	A335/3	Ladislaus Teleki	pf		1885	Piano, original	same as S. 205a/3
205/5	A335/2	Franz Deák	pf		1885	Piano, original	same as S. 205a/2
205/6	A335/6	Alexander Petofi	pf		1885	Piano, original	same as S. 195, S. 205a/6
205/7	A335/7	Michael Mosonyi	pf		1885	Piano, original	same as S. 194; 1st version of S. 205a/7
205a	A335	Historische ungarische Bildnisse	pf		1885	Piano, original	2nd version of S. 205
205a/1	A335/1	Széchenyi István	pf		1885	Piano, original	same as S. 205/1
205a/2	A335/2	Deák Ferenc	pf		1885	Piano, original	same as S. 205/5
205a/3	A335/3	Teleki László	pf		1885	Piano, original	same as S. 205/4
205a/4	A335/4	Eötvös József	pf		1885	Piano, original	same as S. 205/2
205a/5	A335/5	Vörösmarty Mihály	pf		1885	Piano, original	same as S. 205/3
205a/6	A335/6	Petofi Sándor	pf		1885	Piano, original	same as S. 195, S. 205/6
205a/7	A335/7	Mosonyi Mihály	pf		1885	Piano, original	2nd version of S. 205a/7
206	A334	Trauervorspiel und Trauermarsch	pf		1885	Piano, original	
206/1	A334/1	Preludio funebre	pf		1885	Piano, original	
206/2	A334/2	Marcia funebre	pf		1885	Piano, original	based on a theme from Funeral Music for István Széchenyi by Mihály Mosonyi
207	A336	En rêve (Nocturne)	pf		1885	Piano, original	
207a	A296	Prélude à la Polka d'Alexandre Porfiryevitch Borodine (Variation sur le thème favori et obligé)	pf		1880	Piano, original	formerly listed as S. 256; based on the "Chopsticks" polka by Alexander Borodin from the album Paraphrases
208	A312	Unstern (Sinistre)	pf		1881	Piano, original	
208a–233b		===== Works in dance form =====					
208a	A2/2	Waltz	pf	A major	1823?	Piano, dance form	arr. of S. 126b/2
209	A32a	Grande valse di bravura (Le bal de Berne)	pf		1836	Piano, dance form	themes re-used in S. 209a; 1st version of S. 214/1; arr. for pf4h as S. 615
209a	—	Waltz	pf	E♭ major	1840	Piano, dance form	uses themes from S. 209
210	A57a	Valse mélancolique	pf	E major	1839	Piano, dance form	2nd version of S. 210a, S. 214/2
210a	A57a	Valse mélancolique	pf	E major	1840?	Piano, dance form	1st version of S. 210, S. 214/2
210b	A28	Waltz	pf	A major	1835?	Piano, dance form	
211	A95	Ländler	pf	A♭ major	1843	Piano, dance form	
211a	A289/1	Ländler	pf	D major	1879	Piano, dance form	formerly S. 734
212i	A84	Petite valse favorite (Souvenir de St Pétersbourg)	pf		1842	Piano, dance form	1st version of S. 212ii
212ii	A84a	Petite valse favorite (Souvenir de St Pétersbourg)	pf		1843	Piano, dance form	2nd version of S. 212i
212a	A82	Valse pour Marie (Mariotte)	pf		1842	Piano, dance form	
213	A84c	Valse-Impromptu	pf		1850–52	Piano, dance form	based on S. 212
213a	A84c	Valse-Impromptu	pf		1870s?	Piano, dance form	S. 213 with latter additions
213b	A84c	Valse-Impromptu	pf		1870s?	Piano, dance form	version facilitée
214	—	Caprices-Valses (3):	pf		1850–52	Piano, dance form	
214/1	A32b	Valse de bravoure	pf	B♭ major	1850–52	Piano, dance form	2nd version of S. 209
214/2	A57b	Valse mélancolique	pf	E major	1850	Piano, dance form	3rd version of S. 210, S. 210a
214/3	A88b	Valse de concert sur deux motifs de "Lucia" et "Parisina" de Donizetti	pf	A major	1850–52	Piano, dance form	2nd version of S. 401; using themes from Parisina and Lucia di Lammermoor by Gaetano Donizetti
214a	A271	Carrousel de Madame Pelet-Narbonne	pf		1879?	Piano, dance form	
215	A311	Valses oubliées (4):	pf		1881–84	Piano, dance form	
215/1	A311/1	Valse oubliée No.1	pf	F♯ major	1881	Piano, dance form	
215/2	A311/2	Valse oubliée No.2	pf	A♭ major	1883	Piano, dance form	
215/3	A311/3	Valse oubliée No.3	pf		1883	Piano, dance form	1st version of S. 215/3a
215/3a	A311/3	Valse oubliée No.3	pf		1883?	Piano, dance form	2nd version of S. 215/3
215/4	A311/4	Valse oubliée No.4	pf		1884	Piano, dance form	
215a	A325	Mephisto Waltz No.3	pf		1883	Piano, dance form	1st version of S. 216
216	A325	Mephisto Waltz No.3	pf		1883	Piano, dance form	2nd version of S. 215a; arr. for pf4h as S. 615a
216a	A338	Bagatelle sans tonalité	pf		1885	Piano, dance form	manuscript entitled "4th Mephisto Waltz", but no relation to S. 216b or S. 696
216b	A337	Mephisto Waltz No.4	pf		1885	Piano, dance form	1st (complete) version of S. 696
217	A317	Mephisto Polka	pf		1882–83	Piano, dance form	exists in two versions
218	A119	Galop	pf	A minor	1846	Piano, dance form	
219	A43	Grand galop chromatique	pf	E♭ major	1838	Piano, dance form	1st version of S. 219a; arr. for pf4h as S. 616
219a	A43	Grand galop chromatique	pf	E major	1840?	Piano, dance form	2nd (simplified) version of S. 219; Probably the piano reduction of Furioso-Galopp, Op. 114 by Johann Strauss the Elder, published as Liszt's arrangement; renumbered from S. 219bis
220	A64	Galop de bal	pf		1840	Piano, dance form	
221	A168	Mazurka brillante	pf		1850	Piano, dance form	
221a#	A221	Mazurka	pf	F minor		Piano, dance form	now believed to be spurious
222#	—	Petite valse favorite	pf			Piano, dance form	renumbered as S. 212a
223	A171	Polonaises (2):	pf		1850–51	Piano, dance form	
223/1	A171/1	Polonaise mélancolique	pf	C minor	1850–51	Piano, dance form	
223/2	A171/2	Polonaise	pf	E major	1850–51	Piano, dance form	
224	A313	Csárdás macabre	pf		1881–82	Piano, dance form	arr. for pf4h as S. 617
225	A333	Csárdás (2):	pf		1884	Piano, dance form	
225/1	A333/1	Csárdás	pf		1884	Piano, dance form	
225/2	A333/2	Csárdás obstinée (Hartnäckiger Csardas)	pf		1884	Piano, dance form	possibly arr. for pf4h as S. 618
226	A188	Festvorspiel (Preludio pomposo)	pf		1856	Piano, dance form	arr. for orch as S. 356
226a	A10	Marche funèbre	pf	G minor	1827	Piano, dance form	formerly S. 745
227	A164a	Festmarsch zur Säcularfeier von Goethes Geburtstag	pf	E♭ major	1849	Piano, dance form	uses themes from S. 167o; 1st version of S. 227, S. 115, S. 606, S. 521
227a	A182	Festmarsch	pf	C major	1853	Piano, dance form	1st version of S. 228; arr. for orch by Liszt and Joachim Raff as S. 357/1
228	A182	Huldigungsmarsch	pf	C major	1857	Piano, dance form	2nd version of S. 227a; arr. for orch as S. 357/2
229	A184	Vom Fels zum Meer! (Deutscher Siegesmarsch)	pf	E♭ major	1853–56	Piano, dance form	arr. for pf4h as S. 618a; for orch as S. 368
229a	—	Ungarischer Marsch	pf	B♭ major	1859	Piano, dance form	unpublished
230	A326	Bülow-Marsch	pf		1883	Piano, dance form	arr. for pf4h as S. 619; for 2pf (8 hands) as S. 657b
230a	A274	Festpolonaise	pf		1876	Piano, dance form	formerly S. 528; arr. for pf4h as S. 619a
231	A65	Heroischer Marsch in ungarischem Stil (Marche héroïque dans le genre hongrois)	pf	A minor	1840	Piano, dance form	partly based on S. 103
232	A112/1	Seconde marche hongroise (Ungarischer Sturmmarsch)	pf		1842	Piano, dance form	1st version of S. 119
233	A252	Ungarischer Geschwindmarsch (Magyar Gyors induló)	pf		1870–71	Piano, dance form	possibly 1st version of S. 460
233a	A332	Siegesmarsch (Marche triomphale)	pf	E♭ major	1884	Piano, dance form	
233b	A105	Marche hongroise	pf	E♭ minor	1844	Piano, dance form	
233c–254		===== Works on national themes =====					
233c–234		====== Austrian ======					
233c#	—	Tyrolean Melody	pf			Piano, national theme	deleted; see S. 385a
234	A67	Hussitenlied (Aus dem 15. Jahrhundert)	pf		1840	Piano, national theme	based on the song Těšme se blahou nadějć by Josef Theodor Krov; arr. for pf4h as S. 620
235		====== English ======					
235	A76	God Save the Queen (Paraphrase de concert)	pf		1841–49	Piano, national theme	based on the British national anthem; rev. as S. 694
236–239		====== French ======					
236/1	A106	Faribolo Pasteur (Chanson tirée du poème de Françonetto de Jacques Jasmin)	pf		1844	Piano, national theme	
236/2	A107	Chanson du Béarn (Pastorale)	pf		1844	Piano, national theme	based on a song by René de Galard de Béarn, Marquis de Brassac
237	A236	La Marseillaise (Chant de guerre par Claude-Joseph Rouget de Lisle)	pf		1866–72	Piano, national theme	after the French national anthem La Marseillaise by Claude Joseph Rouget de Lisle
238	A169	La cloche sonne	pf	C minor	1850?	Piano, national theme	based on an old French song
239	A262	Vive Henri IV	pf		1879–80	Piano, national theme	based on the French anthem Marche de Henri IV
240		====== German ======					
240	A96	Gaudeamus igitur (Chanson des étudiants)	pf		1843	Piano, national theme	exists in two versions; based on a traditional student song
241–246		====== Hungarian ======					
241	A11	Zum Andenken (Ungarische Werbungstänze) (2):	pf		1828	Piano, national theme	Hungarian recruiting songs
241/1	A11/1	Kinizsi notája	pf		1828	Piano, national theme	based on a dance by László Fáy
241/2	A11/2	Lassú magyar	pf		1828	Piano, national theme	based on a dance by János Bihari
241a	A180	Ungarischer Romanzero (Hungarian Romances) (18):	pf		1853	Piano, national theme	based on popular Hungarian themes, by Liszt and Eduard Remenyi
241a/1	A180/1	Ungarischer Romanzero No.1	pf	F minor	1853	Piano, national theme	composed by Eduard Remenyi
241a/2	A180/2	Ungarischer Romanzero No.2	pf	A minor	1853	Piano, national theme	
241a/3	A180/3	Ungarischer Romanzero No.3	pf	A minor	1853	Piano, national theme	
241a/4	A180/4	Ungarischer Romanzero No.4	pf	A minor	1853	Piano, national theme	composed by Eduard Remenyi
241a/5	A180/5	Ungarischer Romanzero No.5	pf	D minor	1853	Piano, national theme	
241a/6	A180/6	Ungarischer Romanzero No.6	pf	A major	1853	Piano, national theme	
241a/7	A180/7	Ungarischer Romanzero No.7	pf	A major	1853	Piano, national theme	
241a/8	A180/8	Ungarischer Romanzero No.8	pf	D minor	1853	Piano, national theme	
241a/9	A180/9	Ungarischer Romanzero No.9	pf	A major	1853	Piano, national theme	
241a/10	A180/10	Ungarischer Romanzero No.10	pf	G minor	1853	Piano, national theme	
241a/11	A180/11	Ungarischer Romanzero No.11	pf	F major	1853	Piano, national theme	
241a/12	A180/12	Ungarischer Romanzero No.12	pf	C major	1853	Piano, national theme	composed by Eduard Remenyi
241a/13	A180/13	Ungarischer Romanzero No.13	pf	F♯ minor	1853	Piano, national theme	composed by Eduard Remenyi
241a/14	A180/14	Ungarischer Romanzero No.14	pf	D major	1853	Piano, national theme	composed by Eduard Remenyi
241a/15	A180/15	Ungarischer Romanzero No.15	pf	D major	1853	Piano, national theme	composed by Eduard Remenyi
241a/16	A180/16	Ungarischer Romanzero No.16	pf	C major	1853	Piano, national theme	composed by Eduard Remenyi
241a/17	A180/17	Ungarischer Romanzero No.17	pf	A major	1853	Piano, national theme	composed by Eduard Remenyi
241a/18	A180/18	Ungarischer Romanzero No.18	pf	A major	1853	Piano, national theme	composed by Eduard Remenyi
241b	—	Magyar Tempo	pf		1840	Piano, national theme	sketches only
242	A60a	Magyar dalok (Ungarische Nationalmelodien)	pf		1839–40	Piano, national theme	originally published as Hefte I (Nos.1–6), Hefte II (No.7), Hefte III (Nos.8–9), Hefte IV (Nos.10–11)
242/1	A60a/1	(Lento)	pf	C minor	1839–40	Piano, national theme	
242/2	A60a/2	(Andantino)	pf	C major	1839–40	Piano, national theme	
242/3	A60a/3	(Sehr langsam)	pf	D♭ major	1839–40	Piano, national theme	
242/4	A60a/4	(Animato)	pf	C♯ major	1839–40	Piano, national theme	1st version of S. 243/2, S. 243/2a; themes re-used in S. 244/6
242/5	A60a/5	(Tempo giusto)	pf	D♭ major	1839–40	Piano, national theme	1st version of S. 243/1, S. 243/1a; themes re-used in S. 244/6
242/6	A60a/6	(Lento)	pf	G minor	1839–40	Piano, national theme	themes re-used in S. 242/12, S. 244/5
242/7	A60a/7	(Andante cantabile, quasi Adagio)	pf	E♭ major	1839–40	Piano, national theme	1st version of S. 244/4
242/8	A60a/8	(Lento. Tempo marcato)	pf	F minor	1839–40	Piano, national theme	
242/9	A60a/9	(Lento. Quasi Presto)	pf	A minor	1839–40	Piano, national theme	
242/10	A60a/10	(Adagio sostenuto a capriccio. Allegro vivace)	pf	D major	1839–40	Piano, national theme	
242/11	A60a/11	(Andante sostenuto. Allegretto)	pf	B♭ major	1839–40	Piano, national theme	1st version of S. 243/3, S. 243/3a; uses themes from S. 164e; themes re-used in S. 244/3, S. 244/6
	A60b	Magyar rapszódiák	pf		1846–47	Piano, national theme	originally published as Book V (No. 12), Book VI (No. 13), Book VII (No. 14), Book VIII (No. 15), Book IX (No. 16), Book X (No. 17)
242/12	A60b/12	Mesto ["Héroïde élégiaque"]	pf	E minor	1846–47	Piano, national theme	partly based on S. 242/6. themes re-used in S. 244/5
242/13	A60b/13	(Tempo di Marcia) ["Rákóczi-Marsch"]	pf	A minor	1846–47	Piano, national theme	3rd version of S. 242a (based on); simplified version as S. 242/13a; see also 4th & 5th versions S. 244/15 & S. 244c
242/13a	A60b	Ungarische National-Melodie ["Rákóczi-Marsch"]	pf	A minor	1846?	Piano, national theme	simplified version of S. 242/13; renumbered from S. 242/13bis
242/14	A60b/14	(Lento a capriccio)	pf	A minor	1846–47	Piano, national theme	themes re-used in S. 244/11
242/15	A60b/15	(Lento. Tempo e stilo zingarese)	pf	D minor	1846–47	Piano, national theme	themes re-used in S. 244/7
242/16	A60b/16	(Preludio. Andante deciso)	pf	E major	1846–47	Piano, national theme	themes re-used in S. 244/10, S. 244/10a
242/17	A60b/17	(Andante sostenuto)	pf	A minor	1846–47	Piano, national theme	themes re-used in S. 244/13
242/18	A60c/18	(Adagio)	pf	C♯ minor	1846–47	Piano, national theme	themes re-used in S. 244/12
242/19	A60c/19	(Lento patetico)	pf	F♯ minor	1846–47	Piano, national theme	themes re-used in of S. 244/8
242/20	A60c/20	(Allegro vivace. Andante) ["Romanian Rhapsody"]	pf	G minor	1846–47	Piano, national theme	themes re-used in S. 244/6, S. 244/12
242/21	A60c/21	(Lento, tempo di marcia funèbre)	pf	E minor	1846–47	Piano, national theme	themes re-used in S. 244/14
242/22	A60e	Pester Karneval	pf	E♭ major	1846–48	Piano, national theme	themes re-used in S. 244/9, S. 244/14
242/23	T5	Rêves et fantaisies	pf	C♯ minor	1844–46?	Piano, national theme	partly based on S. 171a; 1st version of S. 244/1; formerly S. 695d
242a	A59	Rákóczi-Marsch	pf	A minor	1839–40	Piano, national theme	the first of Liszt's many arrangements of the Hungarian national anthem of the time, the Rákóczi March; simplified version as S. 692d; 2nd version as 164f; 3rd version as S. 242/13 (& simplified S. 242/13a); 4th version as S. 244/15 (& simplified S. 244/15a); 5th version as S. 244c; 4th version arr. for orch as S. 117; orch version arr. for pf as S. 244a (& simplified S. 244b), arr. for pf4h as S. 608, and arr. for 2pf as S. 652a
243	A60d	Ungarische Nationalmelodien (3):	pf		1840–43	Piano, national theme	
243/1	A60d/1	(Tempo giusto)	pf	D major	1843	Piano, national theme	2nd version of S. 242/5, S. 243/1a
243/1a	A60d/1	(Tempo giusto) (Im leichten Stile bearbeitet)	pf	D major	1846	Piano, national theme	3rd (lighter) version of S. 242/5, S. 243/1; renumbered from S. 243bis/1
243/2	A60d/2	(Animato)	pf	C♯ major	1843	Piano, national theme	2nd version of S. 242/4, S. 243/2a
243/2a	A60d/2	(Animato) (Im leichten Stile bearbeitet)	pf	C major	1846	Piano, national theme	3rd (lighter) version of S. 242/4, S. 243/2; renumbered from S. 243bis/2
243/3	A60d/3	Prélude (Allegretto)	pf	B♭ major	1843	Piano, national theme	2nd version of S. 242/11, S. 243/3a
243/3a	A60d/3	Prélude (Allegretto) (Im leichten Stile bearbeitet)	pf	B♭ major	1846	Piano, national theme	3rd (lighter) version of S. 242/11, S. 243/3; renumbered from S. 243bis/3
243a	—	Célèbre mélodie hongroise	pf		1866 or later	Piano, national theme	
244	A132	Hungarian Rhapsodies (Ungarische Rhapsodien)	pf		1846–85	Piano, national theme	
244/1	A132/1	Hungarian Rhapsody No. 1 (Lento quasi recitativo)	pf	C♯ minor	1846	Piano, national theme	2nd version of S. 243b
244/2	A132/2	Hungarian Rhapsody No. 2 (Lento a capriccio)	pf	C♯ minor	1847	Piano, national theme	arr. for orch by Liszt and Franz Doppler as S. 359/4, and for pf4h as S. 621/4; see also S. 244/2a
244/2a	A132/2	Hungarian Rhapsody No. 2 (Lento a capriccio)	pf	C♯ minor	1885	Piano, national theme	Cadenzas for S. 244/2; renumbered from S. 244/2bis
244/3	A132/3	Hungarian Rhapsody No. 3 (Andante)	pf	B♭ major	1847	Piano, national theme	uses themes from S. 164e/1 and 2; partly based on S. 242/11
244/4	A132/4	Hungarian Rhapsody No. 4 (Quasi adagio, altiermamente)	pf	E♭ major	1847	Piano, national theme	uses themes from S. 242/7
244/5	A132/5	Hungarian Rhapsody No. 5 (Héroïde-élégiaque)	pf	E minor	1847	Piano, national theme	uses themes from S. 242/6, S. 242/12; arr. for orch by Liszt and Franz Doppler as S. 359/5, and for pf4h as S. 621/5
244/6	A132/6	Hungarian Rhapsody No. 6 (Tempo giusto)	pf	D♭ major	1847	Piano, national theme	uses themes from S. 164e/3, S. 242/4, S. 242/5, S. 242/11, S. 242/20; arr. for orch by Liszt and Franz Doppler as S. 359/3, and for pf4h as S. 621/3
244/7	A132/7	Hungarian Rhapsody No. 7 (Lento)	pf	D minor	1847	Piano, national theme	uses themes from S. 242/15
244/8	A132/8	Hungarian Rhapsody No. 8 (Lento a capriccio)	pf	F♯ minor	1846	Piano, national theme	uses themes from S. 242/19
244/9	A132/9	Hungarian Rhapsody No. 9 ("Pesther Carneval")	pf	E♭ major	1847	Piano, national theme	uses themes from S. 242/22; arr. for orch by Liszt and Franz Doppler as S. 359/6, for pf4h as S. 621/6, and for vn vc pf as S. 379
244/10	A132/10	Hungarian Rhapsody No. 10 (Preludio)	pf	E major	1847	Piano, national theme	1st version of S. 244/10a; uses themes from S. 242/16
244/10a	A132/10	Hungarian Rhapsody No. 10 (Preludio)	pf	E major	1847	Piano, national theme	2nd (easier) version of S. 244/10; uses themes from S. 242/16; renumbered from S. 244/10bis
244/11	A132/11	Hungarian Rhapsody No. 11 (Lento a capriccio)	pf	A minor	1847	Piano, national theme	uses themes from S. 242/14
244/12	A132/12	Hungarian Rhapsody No. 12 (Introduzione. Mesto)	pf	C♯ minor	1847	Piano, national theme	uses themes from S. 242/18, S. 242/20; arr. for orch by Liszt and Franz Doppler as S. 359/2, for pf4h as S. 621/2, and for vn pf as S. 379a
244/13	A132/13	Hungarian Rhapsody No. 13 (Andante sostenuto)	pf	A minor	1847	Piano, national theme	uses themes from S. 242/17
244/14	A132/14	Hungarian Rhapsody No. 14 (Lento, quasi marcia funebre)	pf	F minor	1847	Piano, national theme	uses themes from S. 242/21, S. 242/22; arr. for orch by Liszt and Franz Doppler as S. 359/1; themes used in S. 123
244/15	A132/15	Hungarian Rhapsody No. 15 (Rákóczi-Marsch)	pf	A minor	1847	Piano, national theme	4th version of S. 242a (based on S. 242/13); simplified (easier) version as S. 244/15a; arr. for orch as S. 117
244/15a	A132/15	Hungarian Rhapsody No. 15 (Rákóczi-Marsch)	pf	A minor	1847	Piano, national theme	simplified (easier) version of S. 244/15; renumbered from S. 244/15bis
244/16	A132/16	Hungarian Rhapsody No. 16 (Allegro)	pf	A minor	1882	Piano, national theme	exists in two versions; arr. for pf4h as S. 622
244/17	A132/17	Hungarian Rhapsody No. 17 (Lento)	pf	D minor	1883	Piano, national theme	
244/18	A132/18	Hungarian Rhapsody No. 18 (Lento)	pf	F♯ minor	1885	Piano, national theme	exists in two versions; arr. for pf4h as S. 623 [?]
244/19	A132/19	Hungarian Rhapsody No. 19 (Lento)	pf	D minor	1885	Piano, national theme	based on the Csárdás nobles by Kornél Ábrányi; arr. for pf4h as S. 623a [?]
244a	A224	Rákóczi-Marsch	pf	A minor	1863	Piano, national theme	arr. of S. 117; 6th pf version of S. 242a; simplified version as S. 244b
244b	A224	Rákóczi-Marsch	pf	A minor	1871	Piano, national theme	simplified version of S. 244a
244c	A132/15a	Marche de Rákóczy (Édition populaire)	pf	A minor	1851	Piano, national theme	5th version of S. 242a (based on S. 242/13)
245	A263	Ungarische Volkslieder (Magyar népdal) (5)	pf		1873	Piano, national theme	
245/1	A263/1	Csak titokban	pf	D major	1873	Piano, national theme	
245/2	A263/2	Jaj, beh szennyes	pf	G major	1873	Piano, national theme	
245/3	A263/3	Beh szomoru ez az élet	pf	G major	1873	Piano, national theme	
245/4	A263/4	Beh! Sok falut	pf	C♯ minor	1873	Piano, national theme	
245/5	A263/5	Erdt, erdt, sfrf erdt	pf	F minor	1873	Piano, national theme	
246	A255	Puszta-Wehmut (A puszta keserve)	pf		1871	Piano, national theme	based on a song by Lyudmilla Gizycka-Zámoyská; also arr. for vn pf as S. 379b
247–248a		====== Italian ======					
247#	—	La romanesca	pf			Piano, national theme	deleted; see S. 252a
248i	A85	Canzone Napolitana (Notturno)	pf		1842	Piano, national theme	1st version of S. 248ii
248ii	A85	Canzone Napolitana (Notturno)	pf		1848?	Piano, national theme, Italian	2nd version of S. 248i
249–249b		====== Polish ======					
249	A143	Glanes de Woronince (3):	pf		1847	Piano, national theme	
249/1	A143/1	Ballade d'Ukraïne (Dumka)	pf		1847	Piano, national theme	
249/2	A143/2	Mélodies polonaises	pf		1847	Piano, national theme	based on No.1 of 19 Polish songs, Op. 74 by Frédéric Chopin
249/3	A143/3	Complainte (Dumka)	pf		1847	Piano, national theme	
249a	—	Mélodie polonaise	pf		1843	Piano, national theme	
249b	—	Dumka	pf		1871	Piano, national theme	
249c–251		====== Russian ======					
249c	A289/2	Air cosaque	pf		1879	Piano, national theme	formerly S. 735
249d	A86/1	Le rossignol (Air russe d'Alexander Alabieff)	pf		1842	Piano, national theme	based on a romance by Alexander Alyabyev; 1st version of S. 250/1
250	A86	Mélodies russes (Arabesques) (2):	pf		1842	Piano, national theme	
250/1	A86/1	Le rossignol (Romance de Alexandr Alexandrovitch Alabieff)	pf		1842	Piano, national theme	2nd version of S. 249d
250/2	A86/2	Chanson bohémienne (de Piotr Petrovitch Boulakhov)	pf		1842	Piano, national theme	based on a song by Pyotr Bulakhov
251	A324	Abschied (Russisches Volkslied)	pf		1885	Piano, national theme	
252–254		====== Spanish ======					
252	A33	Rondeau fantastique sur un thème espagnol (El contrabandista)	pf	B♭ major	1836	Piano, national theme	based on an aria from Manuel Garcia's opera El poeta calculista
252a	A14/1	La romanesca (Mélodie du 16ième siècle)	pf		1832–33	Piano, national theme	formerly S. 247; 1st version of S. 252b
252b	A14/2	La romanesca (Mélodie du 16ième siècle)	pf		1852?	Piano, national theme	2nd version of S. 252a Since 1995, this manuscript has been held by the Austrian National Library. They acquired it from descendants of William Dayas, one of Liszt's last pupils.
253	A114	Grosse Konzertfantasie über spanische Weisen	pf		1845	Piano, national theme	2nd version of S. 738; themes used in S. 254
254	A195	Rhapsodie espagnole (Folies d'espagne et Jota aragonesa)	pf		1858	Piano, national theme	based on S. 253
255–256a		==== Piano Duet (four hands) ====					
255#	—	Festpolonaise	pf4h			Piano, 4 hands	renumbered as S. 619a
256#	—	Variation über das Thema von Borodin	pf4h			Piano, 4 hands	renumbered as S. 207a
256a#	—	Nocturne	pf4h	E minor		Piano, 4 hands	arr. of S. 161/5; spurious (not by Liszt)
257–258		==== Piano Duo (2 pianos) ====					
257	C1	Grosses Konzertstück über Themen aus Mendelssohns Lieder ohne Worte	2pf		1834	Piano, 2 pianos	based on themes from Songs Without Words, Op. 19b by Felix Mendelssohn
258i	C18	Concerto pathétique	2pf		1855	Piano, 2 pianos	based on S. 176; 1st version of S. 258ii
258ii	C18	Concerto pathétique	2pf		1866	Piano, 2 pianos	2nd version of S. 258i; arr. for pf orch by Edward Reuss with corrections by Liszt as S. 365a
259–268a		==== Organ ====					
259	E1	Fantasie und Fuge über den Choral Ad nos, ad salutarem undam	org		1850	Organ	based on a theme from the opera Le prophète by Giacomo Meyerbeer; 1st version of S. 259a; Fugue published 1852 as No.4 of S. 414; arr. for pf4h as S. 624; arr. for pf as S. 747a
260i	E3/1	Präludium und Fuge über den Namen BACH	org		1855–56	Organ	1st version of S. 260ii; arr. for pf as S. 529i
260ii	E3/2	Präludium und Fuge über den Namen BACH	org		1869–70	Organ	2nd version of S. 260i (arr. of S. 529ii)
261	E19a	Pio IX (Der Papsthymnus)	org		1863–65	Organ	arr. for pf as S. 530, for pf4h as S. 625, for orch as S. 361; rev. for 2vv (+ org) as S. 36; rev. for ch orch as S. 3/8
261a	E12	Andante religioso	org		1861	Organ	arr. by Alexander Gottschalg (rev. Liszt) of S. 95, movt.IV
262	E20	Ora pro nobis	org		1864	Organ	
263#	—	Resignazione	org		1877–81	Organ	see S. 187a
264	E33	Missa pro organo lectarum celebrationi missarum adjumento inserviens	org		1879	Organ	based on S. 8, S. 265, S. 504
265	E32	Gebet (Preghiera)	org		1879	Organ	rev. as movt. III of S. 264
266	E39	Requiem für die Orgel	org		1883	Organ	based on S. 12
267	E38	Am Grabe Richard Wagners	org		1883	Organ	arr. of S. 135
268	—	Vortragsstücke (2):	org		1884	Organ	
268/1	E41	Introitus	org		1884	Organ	
268/2	E7	Trauerode (Die Todten)	org		1884?	Organ	arr. of S. 112/1
268a	E25	Preludio	org		1885?	Organ	version of S. 666 without vv
269–340a		==== Songs ====					
269/1	N1	Angiolin dal biondo crin (Englein hold im Lockengold)	v pf		1839	Vocal, song	1st version of S. 269/2, S. 269/3; arr. for pf as S. 531/6
269/2	N1	Angiolin dal biondo crin (Englein hold im Lockengold)	v pf		1849?	Vocal, song	2nd version of S. 269/1, S. 269/3
269/3	N1	Angiolin dal biondo crin (Englein hold im Lockengold)	v pf		1859?	Vocal, song	3rd version of S. 269/1, S. 269/2
270a	N14	Sonetti di Petrarca (Petrarca-Sonette) (3):	v pf		1843–46	Vocal, song	1st version of S. 270b (for tenor voice)
270a/1	N14/1	Pace non trovo (Fried' ist versagt mir)	v pf		1843–46	Vocal, song	1st version of S. 270b/2 (for tenor voice); arr. for pf as S. 158/1
270a/2	N14/2	Benedetto sia'l giorno (Sei gesegnet immerdar)	v pf		1843–46	Vocal, song	1st version of S. 270b/1 (for tenor voice); arr. for pf as S. 158/2
270a/3	N14/3	I vidi in terra (So sah ich denn auf Erden Engelsfrieden und Glanz)	v pf		1843–46	Vocal, song	1st version of S. 270b/3 (for tenor voice); arr. for pf as S. 158/3
270b	N14	Sonetti di Petrarca (Petrarca-Sonette) (3):	v pf		1864–82	Vocal, song	2nd version of S. 270a (for low voice)
270b/1	N14/2	Benedetto sia'l giorno (Sei gesegnet immerdar)	v pf		1864–82	Vocal, song	2nd version of S. 270a (for low voice)
270b/2	N14/1	Pace non trovo (Fried' ist versagt mir)	v pf		1864–82	Vocal, song	2nd version of S. 270a (for low voice)
270b/3	N14/3	I vidi in terra (So sah ich denn auf Erden Engelsfrieden und Glanz)	v pf		1864–82	Vocal, song	2nd version of S. 270a (for low voice)
271	N4	Il m'aimait tant	v pf		1840–42	Vocal, song	arr. for pf as S. 533
272/1	N3	Im Rhein, im schönen Strome	v pf		1840	Vocal, song	1st version of S. 272/2; arr. for pf as S. 531/2
272/2	N3	Im Rhein, im schönen Strome	v pf		1855	Vocal, song	2nd version of S. 272/1
273/1	N5	Die Loreley	v pf		1841	Vocal, song	1st version of S. 273/2; arr. for pf as S. 531/1
273/2	N5	Die Loreley	v pf		1854–56	Vocal, song	2nd version of S. 273/1; arr. for pf as S. 532; arr. for v orch as S. 369
274/1	N6	Die Zelle in Nonnenwerth (Ach, nun taucht die Klosterzelle)	v pf		1841	Vocal, song	1st version of S. 274/2, S. 301b/1, S. 301b/2; arr. for pf as S. 534/1
274/2	N6	Die Zelle in Nonnenwerth (Ach, nun taucht die Klosterzelle)	v pf		1858–60	Vocal, song	4th version of S. 274/1, S. 301b/1, S. 301b/2; arr. for pf as S. 534/3, for vn/vc pf as S. 382
275/1	N8/1	Mignons Lied (Kennst du das Land)	v pf		1842	Vocal, song	1st version of S. 275/2, S. 275/3; arr. for pf as S. 531/3
275/2	N8/2	Mignons Lied (Kennst du das Land)	v pf		1854	Vocal, song	2nd version of S. 275/1, S. 275/3
275/3	N8/3	Mignons Lied (Kennst du das Land)	v pf		1860	Vocal, song	3rd version of S. 275/1, S. 275/2; arr. for v orch as S. 370
276/1	N12/1	Comment disaient-ils (Was tun?)	v pf		1842	Vocal, song	1st version of S. 276/2; arr. for pf as S. 534
276/2	N12/2	Comment disaient-ils	v pf		1849–59	Vocal, song	2nd version of S. 276/1
277/1	N21/1	Bist du (Mild wie ein Lufthauch)	v pf		1844	Vocal, song	1st version of S. 277/2
277/2	N21/2	Bist du (Mild wie ein Lufthauch)	v pf		1878	Vocal, song	2nd version of S. 277/1
278/1	N9/1	Es war ein König in Thule	v pf		1842	Vocal, song	1st version of S. 278/2; arr. for pf as S. 531/4
278/2	N9/2	Es war ein König in Thule	v pf		1856	Vocal, song	2nd version of S. 278/1
279/1	N10/1	Der du von dem Himmel bist	v pf		1842	Vocal, song	1st version of S. 279/2, S. 279/3, S. 279/4; arr. for pf as S. 531/5
279/2	N10/2	Der du von dem Himmel bist	v pf		1849	Vocal, song	2nd version of S. 279/1, S. 279/3, S. 279/4
279/3	N10/3	Der du von dem Himmel bist	v pf		1860	Vocal, song	3rd version of S. 279/1, S. 279/2, S. 279/4
279/4	N10/4	Der du von dem Himmel bist	v pf		1870	Vocal, song	4th version of S. 279/1, S. 279/2, S. 279/3
280/1	N23/1	Freudvoll und leidvoll I	v pf		1844	Vocal, song	1st version of S. 280/2; arr. for pf as S. 167a; 1st setting, for 2nd setting see S. 280a
280/2	N23/2	Freudvoll und leidvoll I	v pf		1849	Vocal, song	2nd version of S. 280/1; 1st setting, for 2nd setting see S. 280a
280a	N23/3	Freudvoll und leidvoll II	v pf		1848?	Vocal, song	2nd setting, for 1st setting see S. 280; renumbered from S. 280bis
281	N22a	Die Vätergruft	v pf		1844	Vocal, song	arr. for v orch as S. 371
282/1	N11/1	Oh! quand je dors	v pf		1842	Vocal, song	1st version of S. 282/2; arr. for pf as S. 536
282/2	N11/2	Oh! quand je dors	v pf		1849	Vocal, song	2nd version of S. 282/1
283/1	N24/1	Enfant, si j'étais roi	v pf		1844	Vocal, song	1st version of S. 283/2; arr. for pf as S. 537
283/2	N24/2	Enfant, si j'étais roi	v pf		1849	Vocal, song	2nd version of S. 283/1
284/1	N25/1	S'il est un charmant gazon	v pf		1844	Vocal, song	1st version of S. 284/2; arr. for pf as S. 538
284/2	N25/2	S'il est un charmant gazon	v pf		1849–59	Vocal, song	2nd version of S. 284/1
285	N26	La tombe et la rose	v pf		1844	Vocal, song	arr. for pf as S. 539
286	N27	Gastibelza (Bolero)	v pf		1844	Vocal, song	arr. for pf as S. 540
287/1	N19/1	Du bist wie eine Blume	v pf		1843	Vocal, song	1st version of S. 287/2
287/2	N19/2	Du bist wie eine Blume	v pf		1849	Vocal, song	2nd version of S. 287/1
288/1	N7/1	Was Liebe sei	v pf		1842	Vocal, song	1st setting, for 2nd and 3rd settings see S. 288/2, S. 288/3
288/2	N7/2	Was Liebe sei	v pf		1854–55	Vocal, song	2nd setting, for 1st and 3rd setting see S. 288/1, S. 288/3
288/3	N7/3	Was Liebe sei	v pf		1878–79	Vocal, song	3rd setting, for 1st and 2nd setting see S. 288/1, S. 288/2
289/1	N29/1	Vergiftet sind meine Lieder	v pf		1843	Vocal, song	1st version of S. 289/2
289/2	N29/2	Vergiftet sind meine Lieder	v pf		1859	Vocal, song	2nd version of S. 289/1
290/1	N16/1	Morgens steh ich auf und frage	v pf		1843	Vocal, song	1st version of S. 290/2
290/2	N16/2	Morgens steh ich auf und frage	v pf		1849–59	Vocal, song	2nd version of S. 290/1
291/1	N17/1	Die tote Nachtigall	v pf		1843	Vocal, song	1st version of S. 291/2
291/2	N17/2	Die tote Nachtigall	v pf		1870–79	Vocal, song	2nd version of S. 291/1
292a	N32/1	Lieder aus Schiller's Wilhelm Tell (3)	v pf		1845	Vocal, song	1st version of S. 292b
292a/1	N32/1/1	Der Fischerknabe (Es lächelt der See)	v pf		1845	Vocal, song	1st version of S. 292b/1
292a/2	N32/1/2	Der Hirt (Ihr Matten lebt wohl)	v pf		1845	Vocal, song	1st version of S. 292b/2
292a/2	N32/1/3	Der Alpenjäger (Es donnern die Höh'n)	v pf		1845	Vocal, song	1st version of S. 292b/3
292b	N32/2	Lieder aus Schiller's Wilhelm Tell (3)	v pf		1855?	Vocal, song	2nd version of S. 292a; arr. for v orch as S. 372
292b/1	N32/2/1	Der Fischerknabe (Es lächelt der See)	v pf		1855?	Vocal, song	2nd version of S. 292a/1; arr. for v orch as S. 372/1
292b/2	N32/2/2	Der Hirt (Ihr Matten lebt wohl)	v pf		1855?	Vocal, song	2nd version of S. 292a/2; arr. for v orch as S. 372/2
292b/2	N32/2/3	Der Alpenjäger (Es donnern die Höh'n)	v pf		1855?	Vocal, song	2nd version of S. 292a/3; arr. for v orch as S. 372/3
293/1	N37/1	Jeanne d'Arc au bûcher	v pf		1845	Vocal, song	1st version of S. 293/2; arr. for v orch as S. 373/1
293/2	N37/2	Jeanne d'Arc au bûcher	v pf		1874–75	Vocal, song	2nd version of S. 293/1; arr. for v orch as S. 373/2
294/1	N33/1	Es rauschen die Winde	v pf		1845	Vocal, song	1st version of S. 294/2
294/2	N33/2	Es rauschen die Winde	v pf		1849?	Vocal, song	2nd version of S. 294/1
295	N28	Wo weilt er?	v pf		1844	Vocal, song	
296	N31	Ich möchte hingehn	v pf		1844–56?	Vocal, song	
297/1	N34/1	Wer nie sein Brot mit Tränen aß	v pf		1845	Vocal, song	1st version of S. 297/2
297/2	N34/2	Wer nie sein Brot mit Tränen aß	v pf		1849	Vocal, song	2nd version of S. 297/1
298/1	N18/3/1	O lieb so lang du lieben kannst	v pf		1843	Vocal, song	1st version of S. 298/2
298/2	N18/3/2	O lieb so lang du lieben kannst (Liebestraum No. 3)	v pf		1843	Vocal, song	2nd version of S. 298/1; arr. for pf as S. 541/3
298a	N38	Über die Aeolsharfe	v pf		1846	Vocal, song	
299/1	N39/1	Isten veled	v pf		1847	Vocal, song	1st version of S. 299/2
299/2	N39/2	Isten veled	v pf		1879	Vocal, song	2nd version of S. 299/1
300	N40	Le Juif errant	v pf		1847	Vocal, song	unpublished
301/1	N42/1	Kling leise, mein Lied	v pf		1848	Vocal, song	1st version of S. 301/2
301/2	N42/2	Kling leise, mein Lied	v pf		1849–60	Vocal, song	2nd version of S. 301/1
301a	N30	Oh pourquoi donc	v pf		1844?	Vocal, song	rev. for pf as S. 169
301b/1	N6/2/1	En ces lieux tout me parle d'elle (Élégie)	v pf		1844	Vocal, song	2nd version of S. 274/1, S. 274/2, S. 301b/2; arr. for pf as S. 534/2
301b/2	N6/2/2	Elégie (En ces lieux)	v pf		1845	Vocal, song	3rd version of S. 274/1, S. 274/2, S. 301b/1; arr. for pf as S. 534/2a
302	N45	Die Macht der Musik	v pf		1848	Vocal, song	
303	N43	Weimars Toten	v pf		1848	Vocal, song	
304	N44	Le vieux vagabond (Der alte Vagabund)	v pf		1848	Vocal, song	
305/1	N35/1	Schwebe, schwebe, blaues Auge	v pf		1845	Vocal, song	1st version of S. 305/2
305/2	N35/2	Schwebe, schwebe, blaues Auge	v pf		1849–60	Vocal, song	2nd version of S. 305/1
306/1	N46/1	Über allen Gipfeln ist Ruh	v pf		1848	Vocal, song	1st version of S. 306/2
306/2	N46/2	Über allen Gipfeln ist Ruh	v pf		1859	Vocal, song	2nd version of S. 306/1
306a	N13	Quand tu chantes bercée	v pf		1842	Vocal, song	
306b	N41	Göttliche Gedanken, selige Gefühle	v pf		1848	Vocal, song	
307	N18/1	Hohe Liebe (In Liebesarmen ruht ihr trunken) (Liebestraum No. 1)	v pf		1850	Vocal, song	arr. for pf as S. 541/1
308	N18/2	Gestorben war ich (Seliger tod) (Liebestraum No. 2)	v pf		1845–46	Vocal, song	arr. for pf as S. 541/2
309	N36/1	Ein Fichtenbaum steht einsam I	v pf		1845	Vocal, song	1st setting of S. 309a
309a	N36/2	Ein Fichtenbaum steht einsam II	v pf		1860	Vocal, song	2nd setting of S. 309; renumbered from S. 309bis
310	N20	Nimm einen Strahl der Sonne (Ihr Auge)	v pf		1843–49	Vocal, song	
311/1	N48/1	Anfangs wollt' ich fast verzagen	v pf		1849	Vocal, song	1st version of S. 311/2
311/2	N48/2	Anfangs wollt' ich fast verzagen	v pf		1860?	Vocal, song	2nd version of S. 311/1
312	N51	Wie singt die Lerche schön	v pf		1855	Vocal, song	
313	N53	Weimars Volkslied	v pf		1857	Vocal, song	arr. for pf4h as S. 588; for pf as S. 542/1; for mch ww br perc as S. 87/1a, S. 87/1c.; for orch by Liszt and Franz Doppler as S. 359a; for mch (+ pf) as S. 87/2; for uch br as S. 87/8; for mch as S. 87/3a, S. 87/3b; for org as S. 672/1; for org/harm as S. 672/2; for mch org as S. 87/4; for ch (+ pf) as S. 87/5; for uch as S. 87/6; for cch as S. 87/7
314	N49	Es muss ein Wunderbares sein	v pf		1852	Vocal, song	
315	N52	Ich liebe dich	v pf		1857	Vocal, song	arr. for pf as S. 542a
316	N54	Muttergottes-Sträusslein zum Mai-Monate	v pf		1857	Vocal, song	see also S. 765
316/1	N54/1	Das Veilchen	v pf		1857	Vocal, song	
316/2	N54/2	Das Schlüsselblumen	v pf		1857	Vocal, song	
317	N55	Lasst mich ruhen	v pf		1858	Vocal, song	
318	N56	In Liebeslust	v pf		1858	Vocal, song	
319	N58	Ich scheide	v pf		1860	Vocal, song	
320	N62/1	Die drei Zigeuner	v pf		1860	Vocal, song	arr. for vn pf as S. 383, for v orch as S. 374
321	N59	Die stille Wasserrose	v pf		1860	Vocal, song	
322	N60	Wieder möcht ich dir begegnen	v pf		1860	Vocal, song	
323	N61	Jugendglück	v pf		1860	Vocal, song	
324	N50	Blume und Duft	v pf		1854	Vocal, song	
324a	N64	Не брани меня, мой друг (Do Not Reproach Me)	v pf		1866	Vocal, song	formerly S. 340a
325	N65	Die Fischerstochter	v pf		1871	Vocal, song	
326	N67	La perla (Die Perle)	v pf		1872	Vocal, song	
327	N68	J'ai perdu ma force et ma vie (Ich verlor die Kraft und das Leben)	v pf		1872	Vocal, song	
328	N69	Ihr Glocken von Marling	v pf		1874	Vocal, song	
329	N70	Und sprich	v pf		1875–79	Vocal, song	
330	N71	Sei still	v pf		1877–79?	Vocal, song	
331	N72	Gebet	v pf		1878	Vocal, song	
332	N73	Einst	v pf		1878	Vocal, song	
333	N74	An Edlitam (Zur silbernen Hochzeit)	v pf		1878	Vocal, song	
334	N75	Der Glückliche (Wie glänzt nun die welt)	v pf		1878	Vocal, song	
335	N76	Go Not, Happy Day (Weil noch, Sonnenstrahl)	v pf		1879	Vocal, song	
336	N77	Verlassen (Mir ist die Welt so freudenleer)	v pf		1880	Vocal, song	
337	N78	Des Tages laute Stimmen schweigen	v pf		1880	Vocal, song	
338	N66	Und wir dachten der Toten	v pf		1871?	Vocal, song	
339	M37	A magyarok Istene (Ungarns Gott)	v pf (+ mch)		1881	Vocal, song	arr. for pf as S. 543, for pflh as S. 543a, for org/harm as S. 674, for pf4h as S. 755a[?], for bar mch ww br perc as S. 345a, for vn pf as S. 381a
340	N81	Magyar király-dal (Ungarisches Königslied)	v pf		1883	Vocal, song	arr. for pf as S. 544, for pf4h as S. 626, for mch as S. 93/1, for ch as S. 93/2, for mch pf as S. 93/3, for ch pf as S. 93/4, for mch orch as S. 93/5, for ch orch as S. 93/6, for cch as S. 93/7
340a#	N64	Не брани меня, мой друг (Do Not Reproach Me)	v pf		1866	Vocal, song	deleted; renumbered as S. 324a
341–345a		==== Other vocal works ====					
341	K8	Ave Maria IV	v org/harm	G major	1881	Vocal	arr. for pf as S. 545; for org as S. 674b
342/1	K9/1	Le Crucifix	v pf/harm		1879	Vocal	1st version of S. 342/2, S. 342/3
342/2	K9/2	Le Crucifix	v pf/harm		1879	Vocal	2nd version of S. 342/1, S. 342/3
342/3	K9/3	Le Crucifix	v pf/harm		1881–83	Vocal	3rd version of S. 342/1, S. 342/2
343	K7	Sancta Caecilia	v org/harm		1880–85	Vocal	
344	N79	O Meer im Abendstrahl	2vv pf/harm		1881?	Vocal	
345	L14	Wartburg-Lieder (7):	3vv ch orch/pf		1872–73	Choral	
345/0	L14/0	An Frau Minne (Die Erde ist erschlossen)	ch orch/pf		1872–73	Choral	
345/1	L14/1	Wolfram von Eschenbach (Als wir mit deutschen Klingen)	v ch orch/pf		1872–73	Choral	
345/2	L14/2	Heinrich von Ofterdingen (Hab' ich geträumt?)	v orch/pf		1872–73	Vocal	
345/3	L14/3	Walther von der Vogelweide (Beim Scheiden der Sonne erschimmert)	v orch/pf		1872–73	Vocal	arr. for v vn pf as S. 345/3a
345/3a	L14/3a	Walther von der Vogelweide (Beim Scheiden der Sonne erschimmert)	v vn pf		1872–73	Vocal	arr. of S. 345/3
345/4	L14/4	Der tugendhafte Schreiber (Ich schrieb allzeit nur wenig)	2vv orch/pf		1872–73	Vocal	
345/5	L14/5	Biterolf und der Schmied von Ruhla (Thüringens Wälder senden den Waidmann und den Schmied)	v orch/pf		1872–73	Vocal	
345/6	L14/6	Reimar der Alte (Wo liebende Herzen sich innig vermählt)	v orch/pf		1872–73	Vocal	
345a	L16	A magyarok Istene (Ungarns Gott)	v mch ww br perc		1882	Choral	arr. of S. 339
346–350		==== Recitations ====					
346	P1	Lenore (Der Bräutigam)	nar pf		1857–58	Vocal, recitation	
347	P2	Vor hundert Jahren	nar orch		1859	Vocal, recitation	unpublished
348	P3	Der traurige Mönch (In Schweden steht ein grauer Turm)	nar pf		1860	Vocal, recitation	
349	P5	Des toten Dichters Liebe (A holt költó szerelme)	nar pf		1874	Vocal, recitation	rev. for pf as S. 195
350	P6	Der blinde Sänger (Слепой)	nar pf		1875–77	Vocal, recitation	arr. for pf as S. 546
351–686		=== Arrangements, transcriptions, fantasies, etc. ===					
351–364		==== Orchestral works ====					
351	G32	Mazurka-Fantaisie [H. von Bülow]	orch	B minor	1865	Orchestral, arr.	arr. of the Mazurka-fantaisie for piano, Op. 13 by Hans von Bülow
352	G36	Zweite Ouvertüre zum Barbier von Bagdad [P. Cornelius]	orch		1877–80	Orchestral, arr.	second overture to the opera Der Barbier von Bagdad by Peter Cornelius, completed and orchestrated by Liszt
353	G34	Szózat und Hymnus (2 vaterländische Dichtungen von Vörösmarty and Kölcsey)	orch		1872	Orchestral, arr.	arrs. of the Hungarian patriotic songs Szózat by Béni Egressy and Himnusz by Ferenc Erkel; also arr. for pf as S. 486, for pf4h as S. 628c
353a#	—	Angelus! Prière aux anges gardiens	str			Orchestral, arr.	renumbered as S. 362a
354#	—	Légendes (2)	orch		1863	Orchestral, arr.	renumbered as S. 113a
355	G30	Vexilla regis prodeunt (Kreuzeshymne)	orch		1864	Orchestral, arr.	arr. of S. 185
356	G18	Festvorspiel	orch		1857	Orchestral, arr.	arr. of S. 226
357/1	G8/1	Festmarsch	ww br perc		1853	Orchestral, arr.	arr. of S. 227a by Liszt and Joachim Raff
357/2	G8/2	Huldigungsmarsch	orch		1857	Orchestral, arr.	arr. of S. 228
358	G11	Vom Fels zum Meer! (Deutscher Siegesmarsch)	orch		1853–56?	Orchestral, arr.	arr. of S. 229
359	G21	Hungarian Rhapsodies (6)	orch		1857–60	Orchestral, arr.	arr. from S. 244; arr. for pf4h as S. 621
359/1	G21/1	Hungarian Rhapsody No. 1	orch	F minor	1857–60	Orchestral, arr.	arr. by Liszt and Franz Doppler of S. 244/14; arr. for pf4h by Liszt as S. 621/1
359/2	G21/2	Hungarian Rhapsody No. 2	orch	D minor	1857–60	Orchestral, arr.	arr. by Liszt and Franz Doppler of S. 244/12; arr. for pf4h by Liszt as S. 621/2
359/3	G21/3	Hungarian Rhapsody No. 3	orch	D major	1857–60	Orchestral, arr.	arr. by Liszt and Franz Doppler of S. 244/6; arr. for pf4h by Liszt as S. 621/3
359/4	G21/4	Hungarian Rhapsody No. 4	orch	D minor	1857–60	Orchestral, arr.	arr. by Liszt and Franz Doppler of S. 244/2; arr. for pf4h by Liszt as S. 621/4
359/5	G21/5	Hungarian Rhapsody No. 5 (Héroïde-élégiaque)	orch	E minor	1857–60	Orchestral, arr.	arr. by Liszt and Franz Doppler of S. 244/5; arr. for pf4h by Liszt as S. 621/5
359/6	G21/6	Hungarian Rhapsody No. 6 (Pesther Carneval)	orch	D major	1857–60	Orchestral, arr.	arr. by Liszt and Franz Doppler of S. 244/9; arr. for pf4h by Liszt as S. 621/6
359a	G19	Weimars Volkslied	orch	C major	1857	Orchestral, arr.	arr. of S. 313
360	G26	À la Chapelle Sixtine	orch		1862	Orchestral, arr.	arr. of S. 461/1
361	G31	Der Papsthymnus	orch		1864	Orchestral, arr.	arr. of S. 261
362	H14	Benedictus aus der Ungarischen Krönungsmesse	vn orch		1875–77	Orchestral, arr.	arr. of S. 11/7
362a	D15	Angelus! Priere aux anges gardiens	str/(2vn va vc)		1882	Orchestral, arr.	arr. of S. 163/1
363	G24	Märsche von Franz Schubert (4)	orch		1859–70	Orchestral, arr.	arr. for pf4h as S. 632
363/1	G24/1	(Vivace)	orch	B minor	1859–70	Orchestral, arr.	orchestration of No.3 of 6 Grandes Marches, D. 819 by Franz Schubert; arr. for pf4h as S. 632/1
363/2	G24/2	Trauermarsch	orch	E♭ minor	1859–70	Orchestral, arr.	orchestration of No.5 of 6 Grandes Marches, D. 819 by Franz Schubert; arr. for pf as S. 426/1, for pf4h as S. 632/2
363/3	G24/3	Reitermarsch	orch	C major	1859–70	Orchestral, arr.	orchestration of No.1 of 2 Marches caractéristiques, D. 968b by Franz Schubert; arr. for pf4h as S. 633/3
363/4	G24/4	Ungarischer Marsch	orch	D minor	1859–70	Orchestral, arr.	orchestration of Divertissement à la hongroise, D. 818 by Franz Schubert; arr. for pf4h as S. 632/4
364	G39	Danses galiciennes de Zarembski	orch		1881–82	Orchestral, arr.	orchestration of 3 Danses galiciennes by Juliusz Zarębski
365–367		==== For pianoforte and orchestra ====					
365	H11/1	Grand solo de concert	pf orch		1849–50	Orchestral, piano, arr.	sketches only; based on S. 176
365a	H11/2	Concerto pathétique	pf orch	E minor	1885–86	Orchestral, piano, arr.	arr. of S. 258/2 by Edward Reuss with corrections by Liszt
365b	H5	Hexaméron (Morceau de concert)	pf orch		1837–39	Orchestral, piano, arr.	arr. of S. 392; completed by Leslie Howard
366	H13	Franz Schuberts Grosse Fantasie	pf orch	C major	1851	Orchestral, piano, arr.	arr. of the Fantasie in C major, D. 760 by Franz Schubert; arr. for 2pf as S. 653
367	H10	Polonaise brillante [Weber]	pf orch	E major	1848	Orchestral, piano, arr.	arr. of the Polacca brillante, Op. 72 by Carl Maria von Weber; arr. for pf as S. 455
368–377		==== Songs with orchestra ====					
368	N80	Lieder von Francis Korbay (2):	v orch		1883	Vocal, orchestral, arr.	arrs. of songs by Francis Korbay
368/1	N80/1	Le matin	v orch		1883	Vocal, orchestral, arr.	arr. of the song by Francis Korbay
368/2	N80/2	Gebet	v orch		1883	Vocal, orchestral, arr.	arr. of the song by Francis Korbay; also arr. for v org as S. 683a
369	N5/3	Die Loreley	v orch		1860	Vocal, orchestral, arr.	arr. of S. 273/2
370	N8/4	Mignons Lied (Kennst du das Land)	v orch		1860	Vocal, orchestral, arr.	arr. of S. 275/3
371	N22/2	Die Vätergruft	v orch		1886	Vocal, orchestral, arr.	arr. of S. 281
372	N32/3	Lieder aus Schiller's Wilhelm Tell (3)	v orch		1855	Vocal, orchestral, arr.	arr. of S. 292b
372/1	N32/3/1	Der Fischerknabe (Es lächelt der See)	v orch		1855	Vocal, orchestral, arr.	arr. of S. 292b/1
372/2	N32/3/2	Der Hirt (Ihr Matten lebt wohl)	v orch		1855	Vocal, orchestral, arr.	arr. of S. 292b/2
372/3	N32/3/3	Der Alpenjäger (Es donnern die Höh'n)	v orch		1855	Vocal, orchestral, arr.	arr. of S. 292b/3
373/1	N37/5/1	Jeanne d'Arc au bûcher	v orch		1858	Vocal, orchestral, arr.	arr. of S. 293/1; 1st version of S. 373/2
373/2	N37/5/2	Jeanne d'Arc au bûcher	v orch		1875	Vocal, orchestral, arr.	arr. of S. 293/2; 1st version of S. 373/1
374	N62/2	Die drei Zigeuner	v orch		1871	Vocal, orchestral, arr.	arr. of S. 320
375	N63	Lieder von Schubert (6)	v orch		1860	Vocal, orchestral, arr.	arrs. of songs by Franz Schubert
375/1	N63/1	Die junge Nonne	v orch		1860	Vocal, orchestral, arr.	arr. of Die junge Nonne, D. 828 by Franz Schubert
375/2	N63/2	Gretchen am Spinnrade	v orch		1860	Vocal, orchestral, arr.	arr. of Gretchen am Spinnrade, D. 118 by Franz Schubert
375/3	N63/3	Mignons Lied (Kennst du das Land)	v orch		1860	Vocal, orchestral, arr.	arr. of Mignon, D. 321 by Franz Schubert
375/4	N63/4	Erlkönig	v orch		1860	Vocal, orchestral, arr.	arr. of Erlkönig, D. 328 by Franz Schubert
375/5	N63/5	Der Doppelgänger (Still ist die Nacht)	v orch		1860	Vocal, orchestral, arr.	arr. of No.13 from Schwanengesang, D. 957 by Franz Schubert
375/6	N63/6	Abschied	v orch		1860	Vocal, orchestral, arr.	arr. of No.7 from Schwanengesang, D. 957 by Franz Schubert
376	L13	Die Allmacht von Franz Schubert (Gross ist Jehova, der Herr)	mch org/harm orch		1871	Vocal, orchestral, arr.	arr. of Die Allmacht, D. 852 by Franz Schubert
377	N82	Der Zaubersee (Bűvös tó)	ten orch		1884	Vocal, orchestral, arr.	arr. of a ballad (now lost) by Géza Zichy
377a–383		==== Chamber music, etc. ====					
377a	D9	La notte	vn pf		1864–66?	Chamber, arr.	arr. of S. 112/2; formerly S. 722
378	D15	Angelus! Priere aux anges gardiens	2vn va vc		1883	Chamber, arr.	arr. of S. 163/1
378a	D18/1	Vallée d'Obermann	vn vc pf		1880	Chamber, arr.	arr. by Eduard Lassen and Liszt of S. 160/6; 1st version of S. 378b, S. 378c
378b	D18/2	Vallée d'Obermann	vn vc pf		1880	Chamber, arr.	2nd version of S. 378a, S. 378c
378c	D18/3	Tristia (Vallée d'Obermann)	vn vc pf		1880	Chamber, arr.	3rd version of S. 378a, S. 378b
379	D6	Hungarian Rhapsody No.9	vn vc pf	E♭ major	1848	Chamber, arr.	arr. of S. 244/9
379a	—	Hungarian Rhapsody No. 12	vn pf	C♯ minor	1850–59	Chamber, arr.	arr. of S. 244/12
379b	D17	Puszta-Wehmut	vn pf		1880	Chamber, arr.	arr. of S. 246
380	D7	O du mein holder Abendstern	vc pf		1852	Chamber, arr.	arr. of S. 444 (with Bernhard Cossmann)
381	D10	Aus der Ungarischen Krönungsmesse	vn pf		1869	Chamber, arr.	arr. from S. 11
381/1	D10/1	Benedictus	vn pf		1869	Chamber, arr.	arr. of S. 11/7
381/2	D10/2	Offertorium	vn pf		1869	Chamber, arr.	arr. of S. 11/5
381a	—	A magyarok Istene (Ungarns Gott)	vn pf		1882	Chamber, arr.	arr. of S. 339
382	D21	Die Zelle im Nonnenwerth (Elegie)	vn/vc pf		1883?	Chamber, arr.	arr. of S. 274/2
382a	D11	Consolations (2):	vc pf/org		1870	Chamber, arr.	arr. of extracts from S. 172 by Liszt and Deswert
382a/1	D11/1	(Andante con moto)	vc pf		1870	Chamber, arr.	arr. of S. 172/1 by Liszt and Deswert
382a/2	D11/2	(Quasi Adagio)	vc pf/org/harm		1870	Chamber, arr.	arr. of S. 172/4 by Liszt and Deswert
383	D8	Die drei Zigeuner	vn pf		1864	Chamber, arr.	arr. of S. 320
383a–577ter		==== For pianoforte solo ====					
383a–460		===== Paraphrases, operatic transcriptions, etc. =====					
383a	V12	Virag Dál (Chant des Fleurs) [Ábrányi]	pf		1880	Piano, arr.	additions and corrections by Liszt to the pf piece by Kornél Ábrányi
384	A93	Mazurka pour Piano, arr. composée par un amateur de St. Pétersbourg	pf		1868?	Piano, arr.	arr. of a pf piece by Mikhail Vielgorsky [attributed in some sources to Alexander Alyabyev]
384a	—	Variations on "Tiszantuli szép leany"	pf		1846	Piano, arr.	variations on the Hungarian folk song "Tiszantuli szép leany"
385i	A12a/1	Grande fantaisie sur la tyrolienne de l'opéra La fiancée de Auber	pf	A major	1829	Piano, arr.	based on a theme from the opera La fiancéeby Auber (also used in S. 385a); 1st version of S. 385/2, S. 385/3
385ii	A12a/2	Grande fantaisie sur la tyrolienne de l'opéra La fiancée de Auber	pf	A major	1843?	Piano, arr.	2nd version of S. 385/1, S. 385/3
385iii	—	Souvenir de La fiancée (Grande fantaisie sur la tyrolienne de l'opéra La Fiancée d'Auber)	pf	A major	1842	Piano, arr.	3rd version of S. 385/1, S. 385/2
385a	A12b	Tyrolean Melody	pf	G major	1829	Piano, arr.	formerly S. 233c; based on the same theme as S. 385
386i	A125	Tarantelle di bravura d'après la tarantelle de La muette de Portici	pf		1846	Piano, arr.	based on a theme from the opera La muette de Portici by Auber; 1st version of S. 386ii and S. 386iii
386ii	—	Tarantelle di bravura d'après la tarantelle de La muette de Portici	pf		1846	Piano, arr.	based on a theme from the opera La muette de Portici by Auber; 2nd version of S. 386i and S. 386iii
386iii	—	Tarantelle di bravura d'après la tarantelle de La muette de Portici	pf		1869	Piano, arr.	3rd version of S. 386i and S. 386ii
387	A144/1	Stücke aus der Oper La muette de Portici von Auber (3):	pf		1847–48	Piano, arr.	
387/1	A144/1	Introduction e Cavatine	pf		1847–48	Piano, arr.	based on themes from the opera La muette de Portici by Auber
387/2	A144/2	Klavierstück über ein fremdes Thema	pf		1847–48	Piano, arr.	based on an unidentified theme
388	A124	Capriccio alla turca sur des motifs de Beethoven	pf		1846	Piano, arr.	based on themes from Die Ruinen von Athen, Op. 113 by Ludwig van Beethoven; themes also used in S. 388b, S. 122
388a	A124	Marche des Ruines d'Athenes de Beethoven	pf		1846	Piano, arr.	extracted from S. 388
388b	A177	Fantasie über Themen aus Beethovens Ruinen von Athen	pf		1839	Piano, arr.	based on themes from Die Ruinen von Athen, Op. 113 by Beethoven; rev. as S. 122; themes also used in S. 388
389	A177	Fantasie über Motive aus Beethovens Ruinen von Athen	pf		1852	Piano, arr.	arr. of S. 122
389a	C27	Cadenza to the first movement of Piano Concerto No.3 by Beethoven	pf		1878–79	Piano, arr.	extracted from S. 657a/1
390/1	A34/1	Réminiscences des Puritains de Bellini	pf		1836	Piano, arr.	based on themes from the opera I puritani by Vincenzo Bellini; 1st version of S. 390/2
390/2	A34/2	Réminiscences des Puritains de Bellini	pf		1837	Piano, arr.	2nd version of S. 390/1; ending used in S. 391
391	A74	Introduction et Polonaise de l'opéra I puritani	pf		1840–41	Piano, arr.	based on the conclusion of S. 390/2
392	A41	Hexaméron (Morceaux de concert. Grandes variations de bravoure sur la marche des Puritains de Bellini)	pf		1837–38	Piano, arr.	collaborative work with Sigismond Thalberg, Johann Peter Pixis, Henri Herz, Carl Czerny and Frédéric Chopin; arr. for pf orch as S. 365b, for 2pf as S. 654
393/1	A56/1	Fantaisie sur des motifs favoris de l'opera Somnambula de Bellini	pf		1841	Piano, arr.	based on themes from the opera La sonnambula by Vincenzo Bellini; 1st version of S. 393/2, S. 393/3,
393/2	A56/2	Grand fantaisie de concert sur des motifs favoris de l'opera La sonnambula	pf		1852	Piano, arr.	2nd version of S. 393/1, S. 393/3; arr. for pf4h as S. 627
393/3	A56/3	Grosse Concert-Fantasie aus der Oper Sonnambula	pf		1874	Piano, arr.	3rd version of S. 393/1, S. 393/2
394	A77	Réminiscences de Norma	pf		1841	Piano, arr.	based on themes from the opera Norma by Vincenzo Bellini; arr. for 2pf as S. 655
395	—	L'idée fixe	pf		1833	Piano, arr.	renumbered as S. 470a/1
396	A178	Bénédiction et serment (Deux motifs de Benvenuto Cellini de Berlioz)	pf		1852–53	Piano, arr.	based on themes from the opera Benvenuto Cellini by Hector Berlioz; arr. for pf4h as S. 628
397	A22	Réminiscences de Lucia di Lammermoor	pf		1835–36	Piano, arr.	based on themes from the opera Lucia di Lammermoor by Gaetano Donizetti; arr. for pf4h as S. 628a
398	A23	Marche et Cavatine de Lucia di Lammermoor	pf		1835–36	Piano, arr.	based on themes from the opera Lucia di Lammermoor by Gaetano Donizetti; arr. for pf4h as S. 628b
399	A44	Nuits d'été à Pausilippe (Amusements sur des motifs de l'album de Donizetti) (3):	pf		1838	Piano, arr.	based on themes from the cycle Nuits d'été a Pauslippe by Gaetano Donizetti
399/1	A44/1	Barcarola (Il barcajuolo)	pf		1838	Piano, arr.	based on No.1 from the cycle Nuits d'été a Pauslippe by Gaetano Donizetti
399/2	A44/2	Notturno (L'alito di Bice)	pf		1838	Piano, arr.	based on No.9 from the cycle Nuits d'été a Pauslippe by Gaetano Donizetti
399/3	A44/3	Canzone Napoletana (La torre di Biasone)	pf		1838	Piano, arr.	based on No.4 from the cycle Nuits d'été a Pauslippe by Gaetano Donizetti
399a	A71a	Fantaisie sur des motifs favoris de l'opéra Lucrezia Borgia	pf		1840	Piano, arr.	based on the Chanson à boire and Orgie from the opera Lucrezia Borgia by Gaetano Donizetti; 1st version of S. 400/2
400	A71b	Réminiscences de Lucrezia Borgia (Grande fantaisie sur des motifs de l'opéra de Gaetano Donizetti)	pf		1848	Piano, arr.	based on themes from the opera Lucrezia Borgia by Gaetano Donizetti
400/1	A71b/1	Trio du seconde Acte	pf		1848	Piano, arr.	based on the trio from Act II of the opera Lucrezia Borgia by Gaetano Donizetti
400/2	A71b/2	Chanson á boire (Orgie). Duo. Finale	pf		1848	Piano, arr.	based on the Chanson à boire and Orgie from the opera Lucrezia Borgia by Gaetano Donizetti; 2nd version of S. 399a
400a	A136	Spirto gentil (Kavatine aus der Oper La favorite)	pf		1847	Piano, arr.	based on a theme from Act IV of La favorite by Gaetano Donizetti
401	A88a	Valse a capriccio (sur deux motifs de Lucia et Parisina)	pf		1842	Piano, arr.	based on themes from the operas Parisina and Lucia di Lammermoor by Gaetano Donizetti; 1st version of S. 214/3
402	A108	Marche funèbre de Dom Sébastien de Donizetti	pf		1844	Piano, arr.	based on the funeral march from the opera Dom Sébastien by Gaetano Donizetti
403	A137	Grande paraphrase de la Marche de Donizetti pour le Sultan Abdul-Medjid Khan	pf		1847	Piano, arr.	based on the Grande marche militaire by Gaetano Donizetti; 1st version of S. 403a
403a	A137	Grande paraphrase de la Marche de Donizetti pour le Sultan Abdul-Medjid Khan	pf		1848	Piano, arr.	2nd version of S. 403 ("version facilitée"); renumbered from S. 403bis
404	A160	Halloh! (Jagdchor und Steirer aus der Oper Tony von E. H. z. S. C. G.)	pf		1849	Piano, arr.	based on themes from the opera Tony, oder die Vergeltung by Ernest II, Duke of Saxe-Coburg and Gotha
405	A140	Schwanengesang und Marsch aus Hunyadi László	pf		1847	Piano, arr.	based on themes from the opera Hunyadi László by Ferenc Erkel
405a	V4	Pásztor Lakodalmus (Magyar nóták)	pf		1858	Piano, arr.	corrections and alterations to Les noces du Pâtre by Leo Festetics
406/1	—	Marcia Circassa tratta dall'opera Russlan e Ludmilla di Glinka (Marche des Tcherkesses de l'opera Rouslan et Loudmila)	pf		1843	Piano, arr.	based on Chernomor's March (Act IV, No. 19) from the opera Ruslan and Lyudmila by Mikhail Glinka; 1st version of S. 406/2
406/2	—	Tscherkessenmarsch aus Glinkas Oper Rußlan und Ludmilla	pf		1843, 1875	Piano, arr.	2nd version of S. 406/2; arr. for pf4h as S. 629
407	A208	Valse de l'opéra Faust	pf		1861	Piano, arr.	based on the waltz and duet from Act II of the opera Faust by Charles Gounod
408	A231	Les Sabéennes (Berceuse de l'opéra La reine de Saba)	pf		1865	Piano, arr.	based on the berceuse from the opera La reine de Saba by Charles Gounod
409	A237	Les adieux (Rêverie sur un motif de l'opéra Roméo et Juliette)	pf		1867	Piano, arr.	based on a theme from the opera Roméo et Juliette by Charles Gounod
409a	A20	Réminiscences de La juive (Fantaisie brillante sur des motifs de l'opéra de Halévy)	pf		1835	Piano, arr.	based on themes from the opera La Juive by Fromental Halévy
410	A166	Konzertparaphrase über Mendelssohns Hochzeitsmarsch und Elfenreigen aus der Musik zu Shakespeares Sommernachtstraum	pf		1849–50	Piano, arr.	based on themes from the incidental music to A Midsummer Night's Dream, Op. 61 by Felix Mendelssohn
411	A47	Soirées italiennes (Amusements sur des motifs de Mercadante) (6):	pf		1838–39	Piano, arr.	based on 6 of the 12 Soirées italiennes by Saverio Mercadante
411/1	A47/1	La primavera (Canzonetta)	pf		1838–39	Piano, arr.	based on No.2 of the Soirées italiennes by Saverio Mercadante
411/2	A47/2	Il galop	pf		1838–39	Piano, arr.	based on No.10 of the Soirées italiennes by Saverio Mercadante
411/3	A47/3	Il pastore svizzero (Tirolese)	pf		1838–39	Piano, arr.	based on No.4 of the Soirées italiennes by Saverio Mercadante
411/4	A47/4	La serenata del marinaro	pf		1838–39	Piano, arr.	based on No.5 of the Soirées italiennes by Saverio Mercadante
411/5	A47/5	Il Brindisi (Rondoletto)	pf		1838–39	Piano, arr.	based on No.11 of the Soirées italiennes by Saverio Mercadante
411/6	A47/6	La zingarella spagnuola (Bolero)	pf		1838–39	Piano, arr.	based on No.8 of the Soirées italiennes by Saverio Mercadante
412/1	A35	Réminiscences des Huguenots (Grande fantaisie dramatique)	pf		1836	Piano, arr.	based on themes from the opera Les Huguenots by Giacomo Meyerbeer; 1st version of S. 412/2, S. 412/3
412/2	A35	Réminiscences des Huguenots (Grande fantaisie dramatique)	pf		1838	Piano, arr.	2nd version of S. 412/1, S. 412/3
412/3	A35	Grande fantaisie dramatique sur des thèmes de l'opéra Les Huguenots	pf		1842	Piano, arr.	3rd version of S. 412/2, S. 412/3
412a	A120	Cavatine de Robert le diable	pf		1841–46?	Piano, arr.	based on Isabella's cavatina from the opera Robert le diable by Giacomo Meyerbeer
413	A78	Réminiscences de Robert le diable	pf		1841	Piano, arr.	based on the Valse infernale and Air de ballet from the opera Robert le diable by Giacomo Meyerbeer; arr. for pf4h as S. 630 [?]
414	A165	Illustrations du Prophète	pf		1849–50	Piano, arr.	based on themes from the opera Le prophète by Giacomo Meyerbeer
414/1	A165/1	Prière. Hymne triomphal. Marche du sacre	pf		1849–50	Piano, arr.	based on themes from the opera Le prophète by Giacomo Meyerbeer
414/2	A165/2	Les patineurs. Scherzo	pf		1849–50	Piano, arr.	based on themes from the opera Le prophète by Giacomo Meyerbeer
414/3	A165/3	Pastorale. Appel aux armes	pf		1849–50	Piano, arr.	based on themes from the opera Le prophète by Giacomo Meyerbeer
415	A230	Illustrations de l'opéra L'Africaine	pf		1865	Piano, arr.	based on themes from the opera L'Africaine by Giacomo Meyerbeer
415/1	A230/1	Prière des matelots	pf		1865	Piano, arr.	based on the sailors' prayer from Act III of the opera L'Africaine by Meyerbeer
415/2	A230/2	Marche indienne	pf		1865	Piano, arr.	based on the Indian March from Act IV of the opera L'Africaine by Meyerbeer
416	A79	Le moine [Meyerbeer]	pf		1841	Piano, arr.	arr. of the song by Meyerbeer
417	A232	Fantaisie sur l'opéra hongroise Szép Ilonka	pf		1865–67	Piano, arr.	based on themes from the opera Szép Ilonka by Mihály Mosonyi
418	A80	Réminiscences de Don Juan (Grande fantaisie)	pf		1841	Piano, arr.	based on themes from the opera Don Giovanni, K.527 by Wolfgang Amadeus Mozart; arr. for 2pf as S. 656
419	A24	Grande fantaisie sur des motifs de Niobe (Divertissement sur la cavatine "I tuoi frequenti palpiti")	pf		1835–36	Piano, arr.	based on themes from the opera Niobe by Giovanni Pacini
420	A15	Grande fantaisie de bravoure sur La clochette	pf		1832–34	Piano, arr.	based on the main theme of the last movement of the Violin Concerto No.2, Op. 7 by Niccolò Paganini and Paganini's 9th Caprice from his 24 Caprices
421	A183	Andante Finale und Marsch aus der Oper König Alfred	pf		1853	Piano, arr.	based on extracts from the opera König Alfred, WoO 14, by Joachim Raff; arr. for pf4h as S. 631
421/1	A183/1	Andante	pf		1853	Piano, arr.	arr. for pf4h as S. 631/1
421/2	A183/2	Marsch	pf		1853	Piano, arr.	arr. for pf4h as S. 631/2
421a	A13	Introduction et Variations sur une marche du Siège de Corinthe	pf		1830	Piano, arr.	only the Introduction survives (discovered in 1976 by Nancy B. Reich at Manhattanville College); there is no trace of either the March theme nor the Variations; based on themes from the opera Le siège de Corinthe by Gioachino Rossini; formerly S. 750
422/1	A25	Grande fantaisie sur des motifs de La serenata e L'orgia des Soirées musicales	pf		1835–36	Piano, arr.	based on Nos.4 and 11 of the song cycle Les soirées musicales by Gioachino Rossini; 1st version of S. 422/2
422/2	A25	Grande fantaisie sur des motifs de La serenata e L'orgia des Soirées musicales	pf		1840	Piano, arr.	2nd version of S. 422/1
423	A26	Fantaisie sur des motifs de La pastorella dell'Alpi e Li marinari des Soirées musicales	pf		1835–36	Piano, arr.	based on Nos.12 and 6 of the song cycle Les soirées musicales by Gioachino Rossini
424	A36	Soirées musicales de Rossini	pf		1837	Piano, arr.	based on the song cycle Les soirées musicales by Gioachino Rossini
424/1	A36/1	La promessa (Canzonetta)	pf		1837	Piano, arr.	based on No.1 of the Les soirées musicales by Gioachino Rossini
424/2	A36/2	La regata veneziana (Notturno)	pf		1837	Piano, arr.	based on No.9 of the Les soirées musicales by Gioachino Rossini
424/3	A36/3	L'invito (Bolero)	pf		1837	Piano, arr.	based on No.5 of the Les soirées musicales by Gioachino Rossini
424/4	A36/4	La gita in gondola (Barcarola)	pf		1837	Piano, arr.	based on No.7 of the Les soirées musicales by Gioachino Rossini
424/5	A36/5	Il rimprovero (Canzonetta)	pf		1837	Piano, arr.	based on No.2 of the Les soirées musicales by Gioachino Rossini
424/6	A36/6	La pastorella dell'Alpi (Tirolese)	pf		1837	Piano, arr.	based on No.6 of the Les soirées musicales by Gioachino Rossini
424/7	A36/7	La partenza (Canzonetta)	pf		1837	Piano, arr.	based on No.3 of the Les soirées musicales by Gioachino Rossini
424/8	A36/8	La pesca (Notturno)	pf		1837	Piano, arr.	based on No.10 of the Les soirées musicales by Gioachino Rossini
424/9	A36/9	La danza (Tarantella Napoletana)	pf		1837	Piano, arr.	based on No.8 of the Les soirées musicales by Gioachino Rossini
424/10	A36/10	La serenata (Notturno)	pf		1837	Piano, arr.	based on No.11 of the Les soirées musicales by Gioachino Rossini
424/11	A36/11	L'orgia (Arietta)	pf		1837	Piano, arr.	based on No.4 of the Les soirées musicales by Gioachino Rossini
424/12	A36/12	Li marinari (Duetto)	pf		1837	Piano, arr.	based on No.12 of the Les soirées musicales by Gioachino Rossini
425	A48	Mélodies hongroises d'après Franz Schubert (Schuberts ungarische Melodien)	pf		1838–39	Piano, arr.	based on Divertissement à la hongroise, D. 818 by Franz Schubert; 1st version of S. 425a
425/1	A48/1	Andante	pf		1838–39	Piano, arr.	based on No.1 of Divertissement à la hongroise, D. 818 by Franz Schubert; 1st version of S. 425a/1
425/2a	A48/2	Marche hongroise	pf		1838–39	Piano, arr.	based on No.2 of Divertissement à la hongroise, D. 818 by Franz Schubert; 1st version of S. 425/2b, S. 425/2c, S. 425/2d, S. 425/2e, S. 425a/2 (" 1st Diabelli edition")
425/2b	A48/2	Marche hongroise	pf		1840	Piano, arr.	2nd version of S. 425/2a, S. 425/2c, S. 425/2d, S. 425/2e, S. 425a/2 ("Richault edition")
425/2c	A48/2	Marche hongroise	pf		1840	Piano, arr.	3rd version of S. 425/2a, S. 425/2b, S. 425/2d, S. 425/2e, S. 425a/2 ("Lucca edition")
425/2d	A48/2	Marche hongroise	pf		1879	Piano, arr.	5th version of S. 425/2a, S. 425/2b, S. 425/2c, S. 425/2e, S. 425a/2 ("Menter transcription")
425/2e	A48/2	Marche hongroise	pf		1883	Piano, arr.	6th version of S. 425/2a, S. 425/2b, S. 425/2c, S. 425/2d, S. 425a/2 (" 3rd edition")
425/3	A48/3	Allegretto	pf		1838–39	Piano, arr.	based on No.3 of Divertissement à la hongroise, D. 818 by Franz Schubert; 1st version of S. 425a/3
425a	A48	Mélodies hongroises d'après Franz Schubert (Schuberts ungarische Melodien)	pf		1846	Piano, arr.	2nd (simplified) version of S. 425
425a/1	A48/1	Andante	pf		1846	Piano, arr.	2nd (simplified) version of S. 425a/1
425a/2	A48/2	Marcia	pf		1846	Piano, arr.	4th (simplified) version of S. 425/2a, S. 425/2b, S. 425/2c, S. 425/2d, S. 425/e (" 2nd Diabelli edition")
425a/3	A48/3	Allegretto	pf		1846	Piano, arr.	2nd (simplified) version of S. 425/3
426	A123	Märsche von Franz Schubert (3):	pf		1846	Piano, arr.	
426/1	A123/1	Trauermarsch (Grande marche funèbre)	pf		1846	Piano, arr.	based on No.5 of 6 Grandes marches, D. 819 by Franz Schubert; arr. for orch as S. 363/2, for pf4h as S. 632/2
426/2	A123/2	Grande marche	pf		1846	Piano, arr.	using themes from No.3 of 6 Grandes marches, D. 819, and Grande marche funèbre, D. 859 by Franz Schubert
426/3	A123/3	Grande marche caractéristique	pf		1846	Piano, arr.	using themes from Nos.1 and 2 of 2 Marches caractéristiques, D. 968b, and Nos.1 and 2 of 6 Grandes marches, D. 819 by Franz Schubert
426a	—	Marche militaire (Grande paraphrase de concert)	pf		1870?	Piano, arr.	based on No.1 of 3 Marches militaires, D. 733 by Franz Schubert
427	A131	Soirées de Vienne (Valses-caprices d'après François Schubert)	pf		1846–52	Piano, arr.	based on pf pieces by Franz Schubert
427/1	A131/1	(Allegretto malinconico)	pf	A♭ major	1846–52	Piano, arr.	based on themes from 36 Originaltänze, D. 365; Wiener Damen-Ländler und Ecossaisen, D. 734; and 18 German Dances and Ecossaises, D. 783 by Franz Schubert
427/2	A131/2	(Poco Allegro)	pf	A♭ major	1846–52	Piano, arr.	based on themes from 36 Originaltänze, D. 365 and 38 Waltzes, Ländler and Ecossaises, D. 145 by Franz Schubert
427/3	A131/3	(Allegro vivace)	pf	E major	1846–52	Piano, arr.	based on themes from 18 Deutsche und Ecossaisen, D. 783; 36 Originaltänze, D. 365 and 38 Waltzes, Ländler and Ecossaises, D. 145 by Franz Schubert
427/4	A131/4	(Andantino a capriccio)	pf	D♭ major	1846–52	Piano, arr.	based on themes from 36 Originaltänze, D. 365 by Franz Schubert
427/5	A131/5	(Moderato cantabile con affetto)	pf	G♭ major	1846–52	Piano, arr.	based on themes from 36 Originaltänze, D. 365 and 12 Valses nobles, D. 969 by Franz Schubert
427/6	A131/6	(Allegro con strepito)	pf	A minor	1846–52	Piano, arr.	based on themes from 12 Valses nobles, D. 969; and Valses sentimentales, D. 779 by Franz Schubert; 1st version of S. 427/6a, S. 427/6b
427/6ii	A131/6	(Allegro con spirito)	pf	A minor	1879	Piano, arr.	2nd version of S. 427/6, S. 427/6iii with variants for Sophie Menter
427/6b	A131/6	(Allegro con spirito)	pf	A minor	1883?	Piano, arr.	3rd version of S. 427/6, S. 427/6ii
427/7	A131/7	(Allegro spiritoso)	pf	A major	1846–52	Piano, arr.	based on themes from 18 German Dances and Ecossaises, D. 783 by Franz Schubert
427/8	A131/8	(Allegro con brio)	pf	D major	1846–52	Piano, arr.	based on themes from 18 German Dances and Ecossaises, D. 783 and 12 Valses nobles, D. 969 by Franz Schubert
427/9	A131/9	(Preludio a capriccio)	pf	A♭ major	1846–52	Piano, arr.	based on themes from 36 Originaltänze, D. 365 by Franz Schubert
428	A115	Feuille morte (Élégie d'après Soriano)	pf		1845	Piano, arr.	based on an unidentified composition by Mariano Soriano Fuertes
429	A293	Polonaise aus der Oper Jewgeny Onegin	pf		1879	Piano, arr.	based on the Polonaise from the opera Eugene Onegin, Op. 24 by Pyotr Ilyich Tchaikovsky
430	A318	Valse de concert	pf		1882–83	Piano, arr.	based on part of the Suite en forme de valse by János Végh
431/1	A149/1	Salve Maria de Jérusalem	pf		1848	Piano, arr.	arr. of Giselda's prayer from the opera I Lombardi alla prima crociata by Giuseppe Verdi; 1st version of S. 431/2
431/2	A149/2	Salve Maria de Jérusalem	pf		1882	Piano, arr.	2nd version of S. 431/1
431a	A138	Paraphrase de concert sur Ernani I	pf		1847	Piano, arr.	based on different themes from the opera Ernani by Giuseppe Verdi than S. 432
432	A203	Paraphrase de concert sur Ernani II	pf		1859	Piano, arr.	based on different themes from the opera Ernani by Giuseppe Verdi than S. 431a
433	A199	Miserere du Trovatore (Paraphrase de concert)	pf		1859	Piano, arr.	based on the Miserere from Act IV of the opera Il trovatore by Giuseppe Verdi
434	A187	Paraphrase de concert sur Rigoletto	pf		1855–59?	Piano, arr.	based on the quartet from Act III of the opera Rigoletto by Giuseppe Verdi
435	A240	Finale de Don Carlos (Coro di festa e Marcia funebre)	pf		1867–68	Piano, arr.	arr. of the finale ("Ce jour est plein d'allégresse") from the opera Don Carlos by Giuseppe Verdi
436	A276	Danza sacra e duetto finale d'Aida	pf		1876?	Piano, arr.	arrs. of extracts from
437/1	A284	Agnus Dei della Messa da Requiem di Giuseppe Verdi	pf		1877	Piano, arr.	based on No.5 of the Requiem by Giuseppe Verdi; 1st version of S. 437/1; arr. for org/harm as S. 675c/1
437/2	A284	Agnus Dei della Messa da Requiem di Giuseppe Verdi	pf		1882	Piano, arr.	2nd version of S. 437/2; arr. for org/harm as S. 675c/2
438	A314	Réminiscences de Boccanegra	pf		1882	Piano, arr.	based on themes from the rev. version of the opera Simon Boccanegra by Giuseppe Verdi
439	A200	Phantasiestück über Motive aus Rienzi	pf		1859	Piano, arr.	based on the battle-hymn "Santo spitiro cavaliere" (Act III, No. 10) from the opera Rienzi, WWV 49 by Richard Wagner
440	A204	Spinnerlied aus dem Fliegenden Holländer	pf		1860	Piano, arr.	based on the Chœur des fileuses from Act II of the opera Der fliegende Holländer, WWV 63 by Richard Wagner
441	A259	Ballade aus dem Fliegenden Holländer	pf		1872	Piano, arr.	based on Senta's ballad from Act II of the opera Der fliegende Holländer, WWV 63 by Richard Wagner
442	A146	Ouvertüre zu Tannhäuser	pf		1848	Piano, arr.	based on the overture to the opera Tannhäuser, WWV 70 by Richard Wagner
443/1	A210a	Pilgerchor aus Tannhäuser	pf		1861	Piano, arr.	based on the chorus "Heil! Heil! Der Gnade Wunder Heil!" from Act III of the opera Tannhäuser, WWV 70 by Richard Wagner; 1st version of S. 443/2; arr. for org/harm as S. 676/1
443/2	A210b	Pilgerchor aus Tannhäuser	pf		1885?	Piano, arr.	2nd version of S. 443/1; arr. for org/harm as S. 676/2
444	A163	O du mein holder Abendstern (Rezitativ und Romanze aus der Oper Tannhäuser)	pf		1849	Piano, arr.	based on Wolfram's aria from Act III of the opera Tannhäuser, WWV 70 by Richard Wagner; arr. for vc pf (with Bernhard Cossmann) as S. 380
445	A176	Stücke aus Tannhäuser und Lohengrin (2):	pf		1852	Piano, arr.	arr. for pf4h as S. 634b
445/1a	A176/1	Einzug der Gäste auf der Wartburg	pf		1852	Piano, arr.	based on the March from Act II of the opera Tannhäuser, WWV 70 by Richard Wagner; 1st version of S. 445/1b, S. 445/1c; arr. for pf4h as S. 634b/1
445/1b	A176/1	Einzug der Gäste auf der Wartburg	pf		1874	Piano, arr.	2nd version of S. 445/1a, S. 445/1c
445/1c	A176/1	Einzug der Gäste auf der Wartburg	pf		1876	Piano, arr.	3rd version ("Neue vermehtre Ausgabe") of S. 445/1a, S. 445/1b
445/2	A176/2	Elsas Brautzug zum Münster	pf		1852	Piano, arr.	based on Elsa's bridal procession from Act II of the opera Lohengrin, WWV 75 by Richard Wagner; arr. for pf4h as S. 634b/2
446	A185	Aus Lohengrin	pf		1854	Piano, arr.	based on themes from the opera Lohengrin, WWV 75 by Richard Wagner
446/1	A185/1	Festspiel und Brautlied	pf		1854	Piano, arr.	based on the Prelude and Bridal Chorus from Act III of the opera Lohengrin, WWV 75 by Richard Wagner
446/2	A185/2	Elsas Traum	pf		1854	Piano, arr.	based on Elsa's Dream from Act I of the opera Lohengrin, WWV 75 by Richard Wagner
446/3	A185/3	Lohengrins Verweis an Elsa	pf		1854	Piano, arr.	based on Lohengrin's Rebuke to Elsa from Act III of the opera Lohengrin, WWV 75 by Richard Wagner
447	A239	Isoldes Liebestod (Schlußszene)	pf		1867	Piano, arr.	arr. of the transfiguration scene from the opera Tristan und Isolde, WWV 90 by Richard Wagner
448	A254	Am stillen Herd	pf		1871	Piano, arr.	based on the song from Act I of Die Meistersinger von Nürnberg, WWV 96 by Richard Wagner
449	A269	Walhall aus Der Ring des Nibelungen	pf		1875	Piano, arr.	based on themes from the final scene of the opera Das Rheingold, WWV 86A by Richard Wagner
450	A315	Feierlicher Marsch zum heiligen Gral aus Parsifal	pf		1882	Piano, arr.	based on the theme of the march from Act I of the opera Parsifal, WWV 111 by Richard Wagner
451	A68	Freischütz Fantasie	pf		1840	Piano, arr.	based on "Und ob die Wolke sie verhülle" (Act III) and Waltz (Act I) from the opera Der Freischütz, Op. 77 by Carl Maria von Weber
452	A151	Leyer und Schwerdt (Heroide nach Carl Maria von Weber)	pf		1848	Piano, arr.	based on the themes of Nos.6, 3 and 2 from the choral song collection Leyer und Schwerdt by Carl Maria von Weber
453	A152	Einsam bin ich, nicht allein (Volkslied aus dem Schauspiel Preziosa)	pf		1848	Piano, arr.	based on Preciosa's song (Act II, No.7) from the incidental music to Preciosa, Op. 78 by Carl Maria von Weber
454	A150	Schlummerlied mit Arabesken	pf		1848	Piano, arr.	based on the chorus Schlummerlied, Op. 68 No.4, by Carl Maria von Weber
455	A175	Polonaise brillante [Weber]	pf		1851	Piano, arr.	arr. of the Polacca brillante, Op. 72 by Carl Maria von Weber; arr. for pf orch as S. 367
456	A281	Valse d'Adèle (Transcription brillante)	pf		1877	Piano, arr.	arr. of No.3 of 6 Etudes pour la main gauche seule by Géza Zichy
457#	—						number not allocated
458	A51	Reminiscences de La Scala (Fantasie über italienische Opernmelodien)	pf		1838–39	Piano, arr.	using themes from the opera Il giuramento by Saverio Mercadante and another unidentified source
459#		Three Pieces					deleted; renumbered as S. 387 and S. 387a
460	A330	Kavallerie-Geschwindmarsch	pf		1870	Piano, arr.	
461–577ter		===== Partitions de piano, transcriptions, etc. =====					
461i	A217	À la Chapelle Sixtine (Miserere d'Allegri et Ave verum Corpus de Mozart)	pf		1862	Piano, transcr.	based on the Miserere by Gregorio Allegri and Ave verum corpus, K.618 by Wolfgang Amadeus Mozart; 1st version of S. 461/2; arr. for orch as S. 360
461ii	A217	À la Chapelle Sixtine (Miserere d'Allegri et Ave verum Corpus de Mozart)	pf		1862	Piano, transcr.	2nd version of S. 461/1; arr. for pf4h as S. 633, for org as S. 658
461a	—	Ave verum corpus de Mozart	pf		1867	Piano, transcr.	arr. of the Ave verum corpus, K.618 by Wolfgang Amadeus Mozart; arr. for org/harm as S. 674d
462	A92	Preludes and Fugues by J. S. Bach (6):	pf		1842–50	Piano, transcr.	
462/1	A92/1	Präludium und Fuge	pf	A minor	1842–50	Piano, transcr.	arr. of Prelude and Fugue, BWV 543 by Johann Sebastian Bach
462/2	A92/2	Präludium und Fuge	pf	C major	1842–50	Piano, transcr.	arr. of Prelude and Fugue, BWV 545 by Johann Sebastian Bach
462/3	A92/3	Präludium und Fuge	pf	C minor	1842–50	Piano, transcr.	arr. of Prelude and Fugue, BWV 546 by Johann Sebastian Bach
462/4	A92/4	Präludium und Fuge	pf	C major	1842–50	Piano, transcr.	arr. of Prelude and Fugue, BWV 547 by Johann Sebastian Bach
462/5	A92/5	Präludium und Fuge	pf	E minor	1842–50	Piano, transcr.	arr. of Prelude and Fugue, BWV 548 by Johann Sebastian Bach
462/6	A92/6	Präludium und Fuge	pf	B minor	1842–50	Piano, transcr.	arr. of Prelude and Fugue, BWV 544 by Johann Sebastian Bach
463/1	A244	Orgel Fantasie und Fuge	pf	G minor	1861?	Piano, transcr.	arr. of Fantasia and Fugue, BWV 542, by Johann Sebastian Bach
463/2	A244	Orgel Fantasie und Fuge	pf	G minor	1868	Piano, transcr.	2nd version of S. 463/1
463a	A37b/1	Symphonie No. 5 de Beethoven	pf	C minor	1837	Piano, transcr.	arr. of the Symphony No.5, Op. 67 by Ludwig van Beethoven; 1st version of S. 464/5
463b	A37b/2	Symphonie No. 6 de Beethoven	pf	F major	1837	Piano, transcr.	arr. of the Symphony No.6, Op. 68 by Ludwig van Beethoven; 1st version of S. 463c, S. 464/6
463c	A37b/2	Symphonie No. 6 de Beethoven	pf	F major	1837	Piano, transcr.	arr. of the Symphony No.6, Op. 68 by Ludwig van Beethoven; 2nd version of S. 463b, S. 464/6
463d	A37b/3	Symphonie No. 7 de Beethoven	pf	A major	1837	Piano, transcr.	arr. of the Symphony No.7, Op. 92 by Ludwig van Beethoven; 1st version of S. 464/7
463e	A37a	Marche funèbre de la Symphonie héroïque de Beethoven	pf		1837	Piano, transcr.	arr. of movt. III from Symphony No.3, Op. 55 by Ludwig van Beethoven; rev. in S. 464/3
464	A37	Symphonies de Beethoven (9):	pf		1863–64	Piano, transcr.	
464/1	A37c/1	Symphonie No. 1 de Beethoven	pf	C major	1863–64	Piano, transcr.	arr. of the Symphony No. 1, Op. 21 by Ludwig van Beethoven
464/2	A37c/2	Symphonie No. 2 de Beethoven	pf	D major	1863–64	Piano, transcr.	arr. of the Symphony No.2, Op. 36 by Ludwig van Beethoven;
464/3	A37c/3	Symphonie No. 3 de Beethoven	pf	E♭ major	1863–64	Piano, transcr.	arr. of the Symphony No.3, Op. 55 by Ludwig van Beethoven; movt.II based on S. 463e
464/4	A37c/4	Symphonie No. 4 de Beethoven	pf	B♭ major	1863–64	Piano, transcr.	arr. of the Symphony No.4, Op. 60 by Ludwig van Beethoven;
464/5	A37c/5	Symphonie No. 5 de Beethoven	pf	C minor	1863–64	Piano, transcr.	arr. of the Symphony No.5, Op. 67 by Ludwig van Beethoven; 2nd version of S. 463a
464/6	A37c/6	Symphonie No. 6 de Beethoven	pf	F major	1863–64	Piano, transcr.	arr. of the Symphony No.6, Op. 68 by Ludwig van Beethoven; 3rd version of S. 463b, S. 463c
464/7	A37c/7	Symphonie No. 7 de Beethoven	pf	A major	1863–64	Piano, transcr.	arr. of the Symphony No.7, Op. 92 by Ludwig van Beethoven; 2nd version of S. 463c
464/8	A37c/8	Symphonie No. 8 de Beethoven	pf	F major	1863–64	Piano, transcr.	arr. of the Symphony No.8, Op. 93 by Ludwig van Beethoven
464/9	A37c/9	Symphonie No. 9 de Beethoven	pf	D minor	1863–64	Piano, transcr.	arr. of the Symphony No.9, Op. 125 by Ludwig van Beethoven; arr. for pf as S. 657
465	A69	Grand septuor de Beethoven	pf		1840	Piano, transcr.	arr. of the Septet, Op. 20 by Ludwig van Beethoven; also arr. for pf4h as S. 634
466a	A58	Adelaide von Beethoven	pf		1839	Piano, transcr.	arr. of the song Adelaide, Op. 46 by Ludwig van Beethoven; 1st version of S. 466, S. 466b
466b	A58	Adelaide von Beethoven	pf		1841	Piano, transcr.	arr. of the song Adelaide, Op. 46 by Ludwig van Beethoven; 2nd version of S. 466, S. 466a
466	A58	Adelaide von Beethoven	pf		1847	Piano, transcr.	arr. of the song Adelaide, Op. 46 by Ludwig van Beethoven; 3rd version of S. 466a, S. 466b
467	A70	Beethovens geistliche Lieder von Gellert (6):	pf		1840	Piano, transcr.	arr. of 6 Lieder von Gellert, Op. 48 by Ludwig van Beethoven; published as vol.1 of Konzerttranskriptionen über 10 geistliche Lieder von Beethoven und Schubert
467/1	A70/1	Gottes Macht und Vorsehung	pf		1840	Piano, transcr.	arr. of No.5 of 6 Lieder von Gellert, Op. 48 by Ludwig van Beethoven
467/2	A70/2	Bitten	pf		1840	Piano, transcr.	arr. of No.1 of 6 Lieder von Gellert, Op. 48 by Ludwig van Beethoven
467/3	A70/3	Bußlied	pf		1840	Piano, transcr.	arr. of No.6 6 Lieder von Gellert, Op. 48 by Ludwig van Beethoven
467/4	A70/4	Vom Tode	pf		1840	Piano, transcr.	arr. of No.3 of 6 Lieder von Gellert, Op. 48 by Ludwig van Beethoven
467/5	A70/5	Die Liebe des Nächsten	pf		1840	Piano, transcr.	arr. of No.2 of 6 Lieder von Gellert, Op. 48 by Ludwig van Beethoven
467/6	A70/6	Die Ehre Gottes aus der Natur	pf		1840	Piano, transcr.	arr. of No.4 of 6 Lieder von Gellert, Op. 48 by Ludwig van Beethoven
468	A161	Beethovens Lieder von Goethe (6)	pf		1849	Piano, transcr.	
468/1	A161/1	Mignon	pf		1849	Piano, transcr.	arr. of No.1 of 6 songs, Op. 75 by Ludwig van Beethoven
468/2	A161/2	Mit einem gemalten Bande	pf		1849	Piano, transcr.	arr. of No.3 of 3 Songs, Op. 83 by Ludwig van Beethoven
468/3	A161/3	Freudvoll und leidvoll	pf		1849	Piano, transcr.	arr. of the song from the incidental music to Egmont, Op. 84 by Ludwig van Beethoven
468/4	A161/4	Es war einmal ein König	pf		1849	Piano, transcr.	arr. of No.3 of 6 songs, Op. 75 by Ludwig van Beethoven
468/5	A161/5	Wonne der Wehmut	pf		1849	Piano, transcr.	arr. of No.1 of 3 Songs, Op. 83 by Ludwig van Beethoven
468/6	A161/6	Die Trommel gerühret	pf		1849	Piano, transcr.	arr. of the song from the incidental music to Egmont, Op. 84 by Ludwig van Beethoven
469	A162	An die ferne Geliebte (Liederkreis von Ludwig van Beethoven):	pf		1849	Piano, transcr.	arr. of the song cycle An die ferne Geliebte, Op. 98 by Ludwig van Beethoven
469/1	A162/1	Auf dem Hügel	pf		1849	Piano, transcr.	arr. of No.1 from An die ferne Geliebte, Op. 98 by Ludwig van Beethoven
469/2	A162/2	Wo die Bergen	pf		1849	Piano, transcr.	arr. of No.2 from An die ferne Geliebte, Op. 98 by Ludwig van Beethoven
469/3	A162/3	Leichte Segler	pf		1849	Piano, transcr.	arr. of No.3 from An die ferne Geliebte, Op. 98 by Ludwig van Beethoven
469/4	A162/4	Diese Wolken	pf		1849	Piano, transcr.	arr. of No.4 from An die ferne Geliebte, Op. 98 by Ludwig van Beethoven
469/5	A162/5	Es kehret der Maien	pf		1849	Piano, transcr.	arr. of No.5 from An die ferne Geliebte, Op. 98 by Ludwig van Beethoven
469/6	A162/6	Nimm sie hin denn	pf		1849	Piano, transcr.	arr. of No.6 from An die ferne Geliebte, Op. 98 by Ludwig van Beethoven
470	A16a	Episode de la vie d'un artiste (Grande symphonie fantastique par Hector Berlioz)	pf		1833	Piano, transcr.	arr. of the Symphonie fantastique, H. 48 by Hector Berlioz; 4th movement rev. as S. 470a/2
470a/1	A16b	L'idée fixe (Andante amoroso d'après une mélodie de Berlioz)	pf		1833	Piano, transcr.	formerly S. 395; based on the main theme from the Symphonie fantastique, H. 48 by Hector Berlioz
470a/2	A16c	Marche au supplice de la Symphonie fantastique (Episode de la vie d'un artiste de Hector Berlioz)	pf		1865	Piano, transcr.	2nd version of 4th movement from S. 470
471	A31	Ouverture des Francs-juges de Hector Berlioz	pf		1833	Piano, transcr.	arr. of the concert overture to the opera Les francs-juges, H. 23 by Hector Berlioz
472	D5a	Harold en Italie (Symphonie de Berlioz)	pf (+ va)		1836	Piano, transcr.	arr. of the symphony Harold en Italie, H. 68 by Hector Berlioz
473i	A29a	Marche des pèlerins chantant la prière du soir (de la symphonie Harold en Italie de Hector Berlioz)	pf		1836–37	Piano, transcr.	1st version of S. 473ii
473ii	A29b	Marche des pèlerins (de la symphonie Harold en Italie de Hector Berliioz)	pf		1862	Piano, transcr.	2nd version of S. 473i
474	A30	Ouverture du Roi Lear de Hector Berlioz	pf		1836–37	Piano, transcr.	arr. of the overture to Roi Lear, H. 53 by Hector Berlioz
475	A205	Danse des Sylphes de La damnation de Faust de Hector Berlioz	pf		1860	Piano, transcr.	arr. of the Ballet des Sylphes from part II of La damnation de Faust, H. 111 by Hector Berlioz
476	A38a	Esmeralda (Opéra en 4 actes de L. Bertin)	vv ch pf		1837	Stage	vocal score arr. of the opera La Esmeralda by Louise-Angelique Bertin; see also S. 477 and S. 477a
477	A38b	Air chanté par Massol de Esmerelda de L. Bertin	pf		1837	Piano, transcr.	arr. of Quasimodo's aria "Mon Dieu! j'aime" (No.13) from the opera La Esmeralda by Louise-Angelique Bertin; extracted from S. 476; re-used in S. 478/2
477a	A38c	Morceaux detachés d'Esmeralda de L. Bertin (3):	pf		1837	Piano, transcr.	arrs. of extracts from the opera La Esmeralda by Louise Angelique Bertin; extracted from S. 476
477a/1	A38c/1	Entracte, Recitatif et Romance	pf		1837	Piano, transcr.	arr. of "Quoi! lui" (No.11) from the opera La Esmeralda by Louise Angelique Bertin; extracted from S. 476
477a/2	A38c/2	Air	pf		1837	Piano, transcr.	see S. 476
477a/3	A38c/3	Scène et Trio	pf		1837	Piano, transcr.	arr. of "D'ici vous pourrez voir, sans être vu" (No.10) from the opera La Esmeralda by Louise Angelique Bertin; extracted from S. 476
478	A99	Russischer Galop	pf		1843	Piano, transcr.	arr. of the song You Will Not Believe by Pyotr Bulakhov
479	A265	Tanto gentile e tanto onesta (Dante's Sonett von Hans von Bülow)	pf		1874	Piano, transcr.	arr. of the song Wenn sie euch grüsst mit freundlicher Gebärde, Op. 22, by Hans von Bülow
480	A193	6 Polish Songs (after Chopin)	pf		1857–60	Piano, transcr.	arr. of 6 of 19 Polish songs, Op. 74 by Frédéric Chopin
480/1	A193/1	Mädchens Wunsch (Zyczenie)	pf		1857–60	Piano, transcr.	arr. of No.1 of 19 Polish songs, Op. 74 by Frédéric Chopin
480/2	A193/2	Frühling (Wiosna)	pf		1857–60	Piano, transcr.	arr. of No.2 of 19 Polish songs, Op. 74 by Frédéric Chopin
480/3	A193/3	Das Ringlein (Pierścień)	pf		1857–60	Piano, transcr.	arr. of No.14 of 19 Polish songs, Op. 74 by Frédéric Chopin
480/4	A193/4	Bacchanal (Hulanka)	pf		1857–60	Piano, transcr.	arr. of No.4 of 19 Polish songs, Op. 74 by Frédéric Chopin
480/5	A193/5	Meine Freuden (Moja pieszczotka)	pf		1857–60	Piano, transcr.	arr. of No.12 of 19 Polish songs, Op. 74 by Frédéric Chopin; 1st version of S. 480/5a
480/5a	A193/5	Mes Joies	pf		1860 or later	Piano, transcr.	2nd version of S. 480/5; renumbered from S. 480/5bis
480/6	A193/6	Die Heimkehr (Narzeczony)	pf		1857–60	Piano, transcr.	arr. of No.15 of 19 Polish songs, Op. 74 by Frédéric Chopin
481	A147	Zigeuner-Polka (La célèbre Zigeunerpolka d'August Conradi)	pf		1848	Piano, transcr.	arr. of No.2 of 2 Zigeuner-Polkas, Op. 5 by August Conradi
482	A327	Tarentelle de César Cui	pf		1885	Piano, transcr.	arr. of the Tarantella, Op. 12 by César Cui
483	A291	Tarantella de Dargomijski	pf		1879	Piano, transcr.	arr. of the Tarantella slave by Alexander Dargomyzhsky
484	A170	Bunte Reihe (24 Stücke von Ferdinand David)	pf		1850	Piano, transcr.	arr. of the collection Bunte Reihe by Ferdinand David
484/1	A170/1	Scherzo	pf	C major	1850	Piano, transcr.	arr. of No.1 from Bunte Reihe by Ferdinand David
484/2	A170/2	Erinnerung	pf	C minor	1850	Piano, transcr.	arr. of No.2 from Bunte Reihe by Ferdinand David
484/3	A170/3	Mazurka	pf	D♭ major	1850	Piano, transcr.	arr. of No.3 from Bunte Reihe by Ferdinand David
484/4	A170/4	Tanz	pf	C♯ mino	1850	Piano, transcr.	arr. of No.4 from Bunte Reihe by Ferdinand David
484/5	A170/5	Kinderlied	pf	D major	1850	Piano, transcr.	arr. of No.5 from Bunte Reihe by Ferdinand David
484/6	A170/6	Capriccio	pf	D minor	1850	Piano, transcr.	arr. of No.6 from Bunte Reihe by Ferdinand David
484/7	A170/7	Bolero	pf	E♭ major	1850	Piano, transcr.	arr. of No.7 from Bunte Reihe by Ferdinand David
484/8	A170/8	Elegie	pf	E♭ minor	1850	Piano, transcr.	arr. of No.8 from Bunte Reihe by Ferdinand David
484/9	A170/9	Marsch	pf	E major	1850	Piano, transcr.	arr. of No.9 from Bunte Reihe by Ferdinand David
484/10	A170/10	Toccata	pf	E minor	1850	Piano, transcr.	arr. of No.10 from Bunte Reihe by Ferdinand David
484/11	A170/11	Gondellied	pf	F major	1850	Piano, transcr.	arr. of No.11 from Bunte Reihe by Ferdinand David
484/12	A170/12	Im Sturm	pf	F minor	1850	Piano, transcr.	arr. of No.12 from Bunte Reihe by Ferdinand David
484/13	A170/13	Romanze	pf	F♯ major	1850	Piano, transcr.	arr. of No.13 from Bunte Reihe by Ferdinand David
484/14	A170/14	Allegro agitato	pf	F♯ minor	1850	Piano, transcr.	arr. of No.14 from Bunte Reihe by Ferdinand David
484/15	A170/15	Menuetto	pf	G major	1850	Piano, transcr.	arr. of No.15 from Bunte Reihe by Ferdinand David
484/16	A170/16	Etüde	pf	G minor	1850	Piano, transcr.	arr. of No.16 from Bunte Reihe by Ferdinand David
484/17	A170/17	Intermezzo	pf	A♭ major	1850	Piano, transcr.	arr. of No.17 from Bunte Reihe by Ferdinand David
484/18	A170/18	Serenade	pf	G♯ minor	1850	Piano, transcr.	arr. of No.18 from Bunte Reihe by Ferdinand David
484/19	A170/19	Ungarisch	pf	A major	1850	Piano, transcr.	arr. of No.19 from Bunte Reihe by Ferdinand David; 1st version of S. 484/19a
484/19a	A170/19b	Ungarisch	pf	A major	1850	Piano, transcr.	2nd version of S. 484/19; renumbered from S. 484/19bis
484/20	A170/20	Tarantella	pf	A minor	1850	Piano, transcr.	arr. of No.20 from Bunte Reihe by Ferdinand David
484/21	A170/21	Impromptu	pf	B♭ major	1850	Piano, transcr.	arr. of No.21 from Bunte Reihe by Ferdinand David
484/22	A170/22; A/91	Im russischer Weise	pf	B♭ minor	1850	Piano, transcr.	Souvenir de Russie
484/23	A170/23	Lied	pf	B major	1850	Piano, transcr.	arr. of No.23 from Bunte Reihe by Ferdinand David
484/24	A170/24	Capriccio	pf	B mnor	1850	Piano, transcr.	arr. of No.24 from Bunte Reihe by Ferdinand David
485	A130	Dessauers Lieder (3):	pf		1846–47	Piano, transcr.	
485/1	A130/1	Lockung	pf		1846–47	Piano, transcr.	arr. of the song by Josef Dessauer
485/2	A130/2	Zwei Wege	pf		1846–47	Piano, transcr.	arr. of the song by Josef Dessauer
485/3	A130/3	Spanisches Lied (Bolero)	pf		1846–47	Piano, transcr.	arr. of the song by Josef Dessauer
485a	A251	Der Schwur am Rütli (von F. Draeseke)	pf		1870	Piano, transcr.	arr. of the cantata by Felix Draeseke
485b	A89	Die Gräberinsel (Lied von Ernst, Herzog zu Sachsen-Coburg-Gotha)	pf		1842	Piano, transcr.	arr. of the song by Ernst II, Duke of Saxe-Coburg-Gotha
486	A261	Szózat und Ungarischer Hymnus (Szózat és Magyar Himnusz)	pf		1872	Piano, transcr.	arr. of S. 353
487	A110	Spanisches Ständchen (Melodie von Graf Leó Festetics)	pf		1844	Piano, transcr.	arr. of the song by Leo Festetics
488	A154	Er ist gekommen in Sturm und Regen (Lied von Robert Franz)	pf		1848	Piano, transcr.	arr. of No.7 of 12 Gesänge, Op. 4 by Robert Franz
489	A157	Lieder von Robert Franz (12): Heft I: Schilflieder	pf		1848	Piano, transcr.	
489/1	A157/1	Auf geheimen Waldespfadeie	pf		1848	Piano, transcr.	arr. of No.1 of Schilflieder, Op. 2, by Robert Franz
489/2	A157/2	Drüben geht die Sonne scheiden	pf		1848	Piano, transcr.	arr. of No.2 of Schilflieder, Op. 2, by Robert Franz
489/3	A157/3	Trübe wird's	pf		1848	Piano, transcr.	arr. of No.3 of Schilflieder, Op. 2, by Robert Franz
489/4	A157/4	Sonnenuntergang	pf		1848	Piano, transcr.	arr. of No.4 of Schilflieder, Op. 2, by Robert Franz
489/5	A157/5	Auf dem Teich	pf		1848	Piano, transcr.	arr. of No.5 of Schilflieder, Op. 2, by Robert Franz
		Lieder von Robert Franz (12): Heft II: Drei Lieder	pf		1848	Piano, transcr.	
489/6	A157/6	Der Schalk	pf		1848	Piano, transcr.	arr. of No.1 of 6 Gesänge, Op. 3, by Robert Franz
489/7	A157/7	Der Bote	pf		1848	Piano, transcr.	arr. of No.1 of 6 Gesänge, Op. 8, by Robert Franz
489/8	A157/8	Meeresstille	pf		1848	Piano, transcr.	arr. of No.2 of 6 Gesänge, Op. 8, by Robert Franz
		Lieder von Robert Franz (12): Heft III: Vier Lieder	pf		1848	Piano, transcr.	
489/9	A157/9	Treibt der Sommer seinen Rosen	pf		1848	Piano, transcr.	arr. of No.5 of 6 Gesänge, Op. 8, by Robert Franz
489/10	A157/10	Gewitternacht	pf		1848	Piano, transcr.	arr. of No.6 of 6 Gesänge, Op. 8, by Robert Franz
489/11	A157/11	Das ist ein Brausen und Heulen	pf		1848	Piano, transcr.	arr. of No.4 of 6 Gesänge, Op. 8, by Robert Franz
489/12	A157/12	Frühling und Liebe	pf		1848	Piano, transcr.	arr. of No.3 of 6 Gesänge, Op. 3, by Robert Franz
490	A298	Liebesszene und Fortunas Kugel aus dem Oratorium Die sieben Todsünden (Fantasiestück nach Adalbert von Goldschmidt)	pf		1880	Piano, transcr.	arr. of extracts from the oratorio Die sieben Todsünden by Adalbert von Goldschmidt
491	A235	Hymne á Sainte Cécile de Charles Gounod	pf		1866	Piano, transcr.	arr. of Hymne à Sainte Cécile, by Charles Gounod
492	A245	Tanzmomente von Johann Herbeck	pf		1869	Piano, transcr.	arr. of the Tanzmomente, Op. 14 by Johann von Herbeck
492/1	A245/1	Tanzmomente No.1	pf	G major	1869	Piano, transcr.	arr. of No.1 of the Tanzmomente, Op. 14 by Johann von Herbeck
492/2	A245/2	Tanzmomente No.2	pf	A minor	1869	Piano, transcr.	arr. of No.2 of the Tanzmomente, Op. 14 by Johann von Herbeck
492/3	A245/3	Tanzmomente No.3	pf	F major	1869	Piano, transcr.	arr. of No.3 of the Tanzmomente, Op. 14 by Johann von Herbeck
492/4	A245/4	Tanzmomente No.4	pf	A major	1869	Piano, transcr.	arr. of No.4 of the Tanzmomente, Op. 14 by Johann von Herbeck; 1st version of S. 492/4a
492/4a	A245/4	Tanzmomente No.4	pf	A major	1869	Piano, transcr.	2nd version of S. 492/4; renumbered from S. 492/4bis
492/5	A245/5	Tanzmomente No.5	pf	F major	1869	Piano, transcr.	arr. of No.5 of the Tanzmomente, Op. 14 by Johann von Herbeck
492/6	A245/6	Tanzmomente No.6	pf	D major	1869	Piano, transcr.	arr. of No.6 of the Tanzmomente, Op. 14 by Johann von Herbeck
492/7	A245/7	Tanzmomente No.7	pf	G major	1869	Piano, transcr.	arr. of No.7 of the Tanzmomente, Op. 14 by Johann von Herbeck
492/8	A245/8	Tanzmomente No.8	pf	D major	1869	Piano, transcr.	arr. of No.8 of the Tanzmomente, Op. 14 by Johann von Herbeck
493	A155	Großes Septett von Johann Nepomuk Hummel	pf	D minor	1848	Piano, transcr.	arr. of Septet No.1, Op. 74 by Johann Nepomuk Hummel; 1st version of S. 493/2
494/1	A211/1	Löse, Himmel, meine Seele (Lied von Eduard Lassen)	pf		1861	Piano, transcr.	arr. of No.5 of 6 Lieder von Peter Cornelius, Op. 5 by Eduard Lassen; 1st version of S. 494/2
494/2	A211/1	Löse, Himmel, meine Seele (Lied von Eduard Lassen)	pf		1872	Piano, transcr.	2nd version of S. 494/1
495	A211/2	Ich weil' in tiefer Einsamkeit (Lied von Eduard Lassen)	pf		1872	Piano, transcr.	arr. of No.4 of 6 Lieder von Peter Cornelius, Op. 5 by Eduard Lassen
496	A285/I	Aus der Musik zu Hebbels Nibelungen und Goethes Faust	pf		1878–79	Piano, transcr.	
496/1	A285/I/1	Hagen und Kriemhild	pf		1878–79	Piano, transcr.	arr. from the incidental music to Nibelungen, Op. 47, by Eduard Lassen
496/2	A285/I/2	Bechlarn	pf		1878–79	Piano, transcr.	arr. from the incidental music to Nibelungen, Op. 47, by Eduard Lassen
496/3	A285/II/1	Osterhymne	pf		1878–79	Piano, transcr.	arr. from No.2 of part I of the incidental music to Faust, Op. 57, by Eduard Lassen
496/4	A285/II/2	Hoffestliche Marsch und Polonaise	pf		1878–79	Piano, transcr.	arr. from Nos.2 and 3 of part II of the incidental music to Faust, Op. 57, by Eduard Lassen
497	A323	Symphonisches Zwischenspiel zu Über allen Zauber Liebe (Intermezzo von Eduard Lassen)	pf		1883	Piano, transcr.	arr. from the orchestral intermezzo to Über allen Zauber Liebe, Op. 77, by Eduard Lassen
498	A316	Lieder zu Tannhäuser (Komponiert von Otto Lessmann) (3):	pf		1882	Piano, transcr.	arr. of 3 Lieder aus Wolff's Tannhäuser, Op. 27, by Otto Lessmann
498/1	A316/1	Der Lenz ist gekommen	pf		1882	Piano, transcr.	arr. of No.1 from 3 Lieder aus Wolff's Tannhäuser, Op. 27, by Otto Lessmann
498/2	A316/2	Trinklied ("Itzt hört ein neues Liedlein an")	pf		1882	Piano, transcr.	arr. of No.2 from 3 Lieder aus Wolff's Tannhäuser, Op. 27, by Otto Lessmann
498/3	A316/3	Du schaust mich an mit stummen Fragen	pf		1882	Piano, transcr.	arr. of No.3 from 3 Lieder aus Wolff's Tannhäuser, Op. 27, by Otto Lessmann
498a	A192	Die Legende von der Heiligen Elisabeth:	pf		1857–62	Piano, transcr.	arrs. of extracts from S. 2
498a/1	A192/1	Orchester Einleitung (Orchestral Introduction)	pf		1857–62	Piano, transcr.	arr. of the introduction to S. 2
498a/2	A192/2	Marsch der Kreuzritter (Crusaders' March)	pf		1857–62	Piano, transcr.	arr. of S. 2/3e
498a/3	A192/3	Interludium	pf		1857–62	Piano, transcr.	arr. of S. 2/6a
498b	A222	Christus (2 Orchestersätze aus dem Oratorium)	pf		1871	Piano, transcr.	arrs. of extracts from S. 3
498b/1	A222/1	Hirtengesang an der Krippe	pf		1871	Piano, transcr.	arr. of S. 3/4
498b/2	A222/2	Die heiligen drei Könige	pf		1871	Piano, transcr.	arr. of S. 3/5
498c	A301	San Francesco (Preludio per il Cantico del sol di San Francesco d'Assisi)	pf		1880?	Piano, transcr.	arr. of prelude from S. 4/2
499	A307	Cantico di San Francesco	pf		1881–82	Piano, transcr.	arr. of S. 4/2
500	—	Excelsior! (Preludio zu dem Glocken des Strassburger Münsters)	pf		1874	Piano, transcr.	arr. of prelude from S. 6
501	A238	Aus der Ungarischen Krönungsmesse	pf		1867	Piano, transcr.	arr. of extracts from S. 11
501/1	A238/1	Benedictus	pf		1867	Piano, transcr.	arr. of S. 11/4
501/2	A238/2	Offertorium	pf		1867	Piano, transcr.	arr. of S. 11/5
502	A227	Weinachtslied (Christus ist geboren)	pf		1864	Piano, transcr.	arr. of S. 32
503	A223	Slavimo slavno, Slaveni!	pf		1863	Piano, transcr.	arr. of S. 33
504/1	A247/1	Ave Maria II	pf	D major	1869–70	Piano, transcr.	arr. of S. 38; 1st version of S. 504/2
504/2	A247/2	Ave Maria II	pf	D♭ major	1872	Piano, transcr.	arr. of S. 38; 2nd version of S. 504/1
504a	A287	Via Crucis (Les 14 stations de la croix)	pf		1878–79	Piano, transcr.	arr. of S. 53
504b	A286a	Alte deutsche geistliche Weisen (12):	pf		1878–79	Piano, transcr.	arr. of S. 50
504b/1	A286a/1	Crux ave benedicta	pf		1878–79	Piano, transcr.	arr. of S. 50/9
504b/2	A286a/2	Jesu Christe (Die fünf Wunden)	pf		1878–79	Piano, transcr.	arr. of S. 50/12
504b/3	A286a/3	Meine Seel' erhebt den Herrn (Gott sei gnädig und barmherzig)	pf		1878–79	Piano, transcr.	arr. of S. 50/2
504b/3a	A286a/3a	Es segne uns Gott	pf		1878–79	Piano, transcr.	arr. of S. 50/1
504b/4	A286a/4	Nun danket alle Gott!	pf		1878–79	Piano, transcr.	arr. of S. 50/11
504b/5	A286a/5	Nun ruhen alle Wälder	pf		1878–79	Piano, transcr.	arr. of S. 50/3
504b/6	A286a/6	O Haupt voll Blut und Wunden	pf		1878–79	Piano, transcr.	arr. of S. 50/4
504b/7	A286a/7	O Lamm Gottes!	pf		1878–79	Piano, transcr.	arr. of S. 50/5; arr. for pf4h as S. 582
504b/8	A286a/8	O Traurigkeit	pf		1878–79	Piano, transcr.	arr. of S. 50/10
504b/9	A286a/9	Vexilla Regis	pf		1878–79	Piano, transcr.	arr. of S. 50/8
504b/10	A286a/10	Was Gott tut, das ist wohlgetan	pf		1878–79	Piano, transcr.	arr. of S. 50/6
504b/11	A286a/11	Wer nur den lieben Gott läßt walten	pf		1878–79	Piano, transcr.	arr. of S. 50/7
505	A331	In domum Domini ibimus (Zum Haus des Herrn ziehen wir)	pf		1884	Piano, transcr.	arr. of S. 57
506	A243	Ave maris stella	pf		1868	Piano, transcr.	arr. of 2nd version of S. 34
506b	A294	O Roma nobilis	pf		1879	Piano, transcr.	arr. of S. 54
507	A126	Klavierstück aus der Bonner Beethoven-Kantate	pf		1846	Piano, transcr.	based on themes from the 1st movement of S. 507
507a	A213	Schnitterchor aus den entfesselten Prometheus	pf		1850	Piano, transcr.	arr. of No.4 from S. 69/1 (incomplete); 1st version of S. 508
508	A213	Pastorale (Schnitterchor aus den Entfesselten Prometheus)	pf		1861	Piano, transcr.	arr. of No.4 from S. 69/2; 2nd version of S. 507a
509	A246	Gaudeamus igitur (Humoreske)	pf		1869–70	Piano, transcr.	arr. of S. 71a
510	A153	Marche héroïque	pf		1847–48?	Piano, transcr.	based on S. 82; arr. for pf4h as S. 587
510a	—	Chansons (3)	pf		1852?	Piano, transcr.	1st version of S. 511
510a/1	—	La consolation	pf		1852?	Piano, transcr.	1st version of S. 511/1; arr. of S. 90/4a
510a/2	—	Avant la bataille	pf		1852?	Piano, transcr.	1st version of S. 511/2; arr. of S. 90/5a
510a/3	—	L'espérance	pf		1852?	Piano, transcr.	1st version of S. 511/3; arr. of S. 90/6a
511	A207	Geharnischte Lieder (3):	pf		1860	Piano, transcr.	2nd version of S. 510a
511/1	A207/1	Vor der Schlacht	pf		1860	Piano, transcr.	2nd version of S. 510a/1
511/2	A207/2	Nicht gezagt	pf		1860	Piano, transcr.	2nd version of S. 510a/2
511/3	A207/3	Es rufet Gott uns mahnend	pf		1860	Piano, transcr.	2nd version of S. 510a/3
511a	—	Les préludes (Poème symphonique No 3)	pf		1863	Piano, transcr.	arr. of S. 97 by Karl Klauser, with revisions by Liszt
511b	—	Orpheus (Poème symphonique No.4)	pf		1878	Piano, transcr.	arr. of S. 98 by Friedrich Spiro, with revisions by Liszt
511c	—	Mazeppa (Poème symphonique No.6)	pf		1870–79?	Piano, transcr.	arr. of S. 100 by Theophil Forchhammer, with revisions by Liszt
511d	—	Festklänge (Poème symphonique No.7)	pf		1870–79?	Piano, transcr.	arr. of S. 101 by Ludwig Stark, with revisions by Liszt
511e	—	Hungaria (Poème symphonique No.9)	pf		1872	Piano, transcr.	arr. of S. 103 by Friedrich Spiro, with revisions by Liszt
512	A310	Von der Wiege bis zum Grabe (Poème symphonique No.13)	pf		1881	Piano, original	arr. for pf4h as S. 598
513	A190	Faust Symphony (Andante soave aus der Faust-Symphonie)	pf		1867	Piano, transcr.	arr. of movt. II from S. 108 by Tausig, with revisions by Liszt
513a	A189/1	Der nächtliche Zug (Episode aus Lenaus Faust)	pf		1872	Piano, transcr.	arr. of S. 110/1 by Robert Freund, with revisions by Liszt
514	A189/1	Mephisto Waltz No. 1	pf		1856–61	Piano, transcr.	arr. of S. 110/2
515	A288	Mephisto Waltz No.2	pf		1878–81?	Piano, transcr.	arr. for orch as S. 111; arr. for pf4h as S. 600
516	A202/1	Les morts	pf		1860?	Piano, transcr.	arr. of S. 112/1
516a	A202/2	La notte	pf		1864–66	Piano, transcr.	arr. of S. 112/2 (formerly S. 699)
517	A202/3	Le triomphe funèbre du Tasse	pf		1866–69	Piano, transcr.	arr. of S. 112/3
518	A225	Salve Polonia (Interludium aus dem Oratorium Stanislaus)	pf		1863	Piano, transcr.	arr. of S. 113/2
519	A302	Polonaises de l'oratorio St. Stanislaus	pf		1875	Piano, transcr.	arr. of extracts from S. 688
519/1	A302/1	Polonaise No. 1	pf		1875	Piano, transcr.	arr. of extract from S. 688
519/2	A302/2	Polonaise No. 2	pf		1875	Piano, transcr.	arr. of extract from S. 688
520i	A201	Künstlerfestzug zur Schillerfeier 1859	pf		1859–60	Piano, transcr.	1st version of S. 520a; arr. of S. 114; also uses themes from S. 106
520ii	—	Künstlerfestzug zur Schillerfeier 1859	pf		1883	Piano, transcr.	2nd version of S. 520
521	A164b	Goethe-Festmarsch	pf		1859	Piano, transcr.	arr. of S. 115
522	A196	Festmarsch nach Motiven von E.H. z. S.-C.-G	pf		1858–59	Piano, transcr.	arr. of S. 116
523	A248	Ungarischer Marsch zur Krönungsfeier in Ofen-Pest am 8. Juni 1867	pf		1870	Piano, transcr.	arr. of S. 118
524	A112/2	Ungarischer Sturmmarsch (Hungarian Battle March)	pf		1875–76	Piano, transcr.	arr. of S. 119
524a	H6	Concerto sans orchestre	pf	A major	1839?	Piano, transcr.	unfinished; rev. as S. 125
525	A62	Totentanz	pf		1865	Piano, transcr.	arr. of S. 126ii
526	A260	Epithalam (zu Eduard Reményis Vermählungsfeier)	pf		1872	Piano, transcr.	arr. of S. 129
527	A299	Romance oubliée	pf		1880	Piano, transcr.	based on S. 169; arr. for va pf as S. 132a, for vn pf as S. 132b, for vc pf as S. 132c; arr. for orch as S. 712[?]
528#	—	Festpolonaise	pf			Piano, transcr.	renumbered as S. 230a
529i	A250/1	Präludium und Fuge über das Motiv B.A.C.H.	pf		1855	Piano, transcr.	arr. of S. 260i; 1st version of S. 529ii
529ii	A250/2	Fantasie und Fuge über das Thema B–A–C–H	pf		1870	Piano, transcr.	2nd version of S. 529i; arr. for org as S. 260ii
530	A228	Hymne du Pape	pf		1864	Piano, transcr.	arr. of S. 261
531	A97	Buch der Lieder I (6)	pf		1843	Piano, transcr.	arrs. of various solo songs
531/1	A97/1	Die Loreley	pf		1843	Piano, transcr.	arr. of S. 273/1
531/2	A97/2	Am Rhein in schönen Strome	pf		1843	Piano, transcr.	arr. of S. 272/1
531/3	A97/3	Kennst du das Land	pf		1843	Piano, transcr.	arr. of S. 275/1
531/4	A97/4	Es war ein König in Thule	pf		1843	Piano, transcr.	arr. of S. 278/1
531/5	A97/5	Der du von dem Himmel bist	pf		1843	Piano, transcr.	arr. of S. 279/1
531/6	A97/6	Angiolin	pf		1843	Piano, transcr.	arr. of S. 269/1
532	A209	Die Loreley	pf		1861	Piano, transcr.	arr. of S. 273/2
533	A98	Il m'aimait tant!	pf		1843	Piano, transcr.	arr. of S. 271
534/1	A81a	Die Zelle im Nonnenwerth	pf		1840	Piano, transcr.	arr. of S. 274/1 (1st version of Die Zelle/Élégie)
534/2	A81b	Elégie	pf		1841	Piano, transcr.	arr. of S. 301b/1 (2nd version of Die Zelle/Élégie)
534/2a	A81c	Feuille d'album No.2	pf		1849	Piano, transcr.	arr. of S. 301b/2 (3rd version of Die Zelle/Élégie); renumbered from S. 534/2bis
534/3	A81d	Die Zelle im Nonnenwerth (Elegie)	pf		1881	Piano, transcr.	arr. of S. 274/2 (4th version of Die Zelle/Élégie)
535–540	A139	Buch der Lieder II	pf		1847	Piano, transcr.	
535	A139/2	Comment, disaient-ils	pf		1847	Piano, transcr.	arr. of S. 276/1
536	A139/1	Oh, quand je dors	pf		1847	Piano, transcr.	arr. of S. 282/1
537	A139/3	Enfant, si j'étais roi	pf		1847	Piano, transcr.	arr. of S. 283/1
538	A139/4	S'il est un charmant gazon	pf		1847	Piano, transcr.	arr. of S. 284/1
539	A139/5	La tombe et la rose	pf		1847	Piano, transcr.	arr. of S. 285
540	A139/6	Gastibelza	pf		1847	Piano, transcr.	arr. of S. 286
540a	—	O lieb, so lang du lieben kannst!	pf		1843?	Piano, transcr.	arr. of S. 298/1; reconstructed by Leslie Howard
541	A103	Liebesträume (3):	pf		1850	Piano, transcr.	
541/1	A103/1	Liebestraum No. 1 (Hohe Liebe)	pf	A♭ major	1850	Piano, transcr.	arr. of S. 307
541/2	A103/2	Liebestraum No. 2 (Seliger Tod)	pf	E♭ major	1850	Piano, transcr.	arr. of S. 308; an album leaf on themes from this work exists, entitled "Nocturne No.2"
541/3	A103/3	Liebestraum No. 3 (Oh Lieb, so lang du lieben kannst)	pf	A♭ major	1850	Piano, transcr.	arr. of S. 298/2
542/1	A191a	Weimars Volkslied	pf	C major	1857	Piano, transcr.	arr. of S. 313; 1st version of S. 542/2
542/2	A191b	Weimars Volkslied	pf	F major	1873	Piano, transcr.	2nd version of S. 542/1
542a	A194	Ich liebe dich	pf		1857–60?	Piano, transcr.	arr. of S. 315
542b	A268b	Fanfare zur Enthüllung des Carl-Augusts Monument	pf		1875	Piano, transcr.	arr. of Fanfare from S. 92
543	A309/1	A magyarok Istene (Ungarns Gott)	pf		1881	Piano, transcr.	arr. of S. 339
543a	A309/2	A magyarok Istene (Ungarns Gott)	pflh		1881	Piano, transcr.	arr. of S. 339; renumbered from S. 543bis
544	A328	Magyar király-dal (Ungarisches Königslied)	pf		1883	Piano, transcr.	arr. of S. 340
545	A308	Ave Maria IV	pf		1881	Piano, transcr.	arr. of S. 341
546	A282	Der blinde Sänger (Слепой)	pf		1878	Piano, transcr.	arr. of S. 350
546a	—	O Roma nobilis	pf		1879	Piano, transcr.	renumbered as S. 506b
547	A72	Mendelssohns Lieder (Lieders de Mendelssohn)	pf		1840	Piano, transcr.	
547/1	A72/1	Auf Flügeln des Gesanges (Les ailes du chant)	pf		1840	Piano, transcr.	arr. of No.2 of 6 songs, Op. 34 by Felix Mendelssohn
547/2	A72/2	Sonntagslied (Chant du dimanche)	pf		1840	Piano, transcr.	arr. of No.5 of 6 songs, Op. 34 by Felix Mendelssohn
547/3	A72/3	Reiselied (Chant du voyage)	pf		1840	Piano, transcr.	arr. of No.6 of 6 songs, Op. 34 by Felix Mendelssohn
547/4	A72/4	Neue Liebe (Amour nouveau)	pf		1840	Piano, transcr.	arr. of No.4 of 6 songs, Op. 19a by Felix Mendelssohn
547/5	A72/5	Frühlingslied (Chant du printemps)	pf		1840	Piano, transcr.	arr. of No.3 of 6 songs, Op. 47 by Felix Mendelssohn
547/6	A72/6	Winterlied (Chant d'hiver)	pf		1840	Piano, transcr.	arr. of No.3 of 6 songs, Op. 19 by Felix Mendelssohn
547/7	A72/7	Suleika	pf		1840	Piano, transcr.	arr. of No.4 of 6 songs, Op. 34 by Felix Mendelssohn
548	A156	Mendelssohns Wasserfahrt und Jäger-Abschied	pf		1848	Piano, transcr.	
548/1	A156/1	Wasserfahrt	pf		1848	Piano, transcr.	arr. of No.4 of 6 Lieder, Op. 50 by Felix Mendelssohn
548/2	A156/2	Der Jäger Abschied	pf		1848	Piano, transcr.	arr. of No.2 of 6 Lieder, Op. 50 by Felix Mendelssohn
549	A206	Festmarsch zu Schillers 100 jähriger Geburtstagsfeier (von Giacomo Meyerbeer)	pf		1860	Piano, transcr.	arr. of the Festmarsch zu Schillers 100 jähriger Geburtstagsfeier by Meyerbeer
550	A220	Transcriptionen aus Mozarts Requiem (2):	pf		1865	Piano, transcr.	arr. of extracts from the Requiem, K.626 by Wolfgang Amadeus Mozart
550/1	A220/1	Confutatis maledictis	pf		1865	Piano, transcr.	arr. of extract from the Requiem, K.626 by Wolfgang Amadeus Mozart
550/2	A220/2	Lacrymosa	pf		1865	Piano, transcr.	arr. of extract from the Requiem, K.626 by Wolfgang Amadeus Mozart
551	A270	Una stella amica (Polka mazurka de F. Pezzini)	pf		1874–75?	Piano, transcr.	arr. of an unidentified waltz attributed to "F. Pezzini"
551a	V3	Tanz-Capricen No.1 (Einleitung und Coda zu Raffs Walzer)	pf	D♭ major	1854	Piano, transcr.	additional introduction and coda to No.1 of the Tanz-Capricen, Op. 54, by Joachim Raff
552	A54	Ouverture de l'opéra Guillaume Tell de Gioachino Rossini	pf		1838	Piano, transcr.	arr. of the overture from the opera Guillaume Tell, Rossini
552a	—	Caritas (nach Rossini)	pf		1847	Piano, transcr.	arr. of No.3 of 3 Chœurs religieux by Gioachino Rossini; incomplete sketch as S. 701j; 1st version of S. 552b, S. 553/2; originally intended for S. 172a
552b	—	La caritá (d'après Rossini)	pf		1847	Piano, transcr.	2nd (simplified) version of S. 552a, S. 553/2; originally intended for S. 172a
553	A141	Transcriptions d'après Rossini (2):	pf		1847	Piano, transcr.	
553/1	A141/1	Air du Stabat Mater	pf		1847	Piano, transcr.	arr. of "Cujus animam" from Stabat Mater by Gioachino Rossini; arr. for bn org as S. 679; for ten org as S. 682
553/2	A141/2	La charité	pf		1847	Piano, transcr.	arr. of No.3 of 3 Chœurs religieux by Gioachino Rossini; 3rd version of S. 552a, S. 552b
554/1	A304	O! Wenn es doch immer so bliebe! (Lied von Anton Rubinstein)	pf		1881	Piano, transcr.	arr. of No.9 of 12 Lieder des Mirza-Schaffy, Op. 34 by Anton Rubinstein
554/2	A329	Der Asra (Lied von Anton Rubinstein)	pf		1880	Piano, transcr.	arr. of No.6 of 6 Lieder von Heine, Op. 32 by Anton Rubinstein
554a	V5	Étude sur des notes fausses (Einleitung und Coda zu Anton Rubinsteins Etude)	pf	C major	1880?	Piano, transcr.	revisions and additions to Etude on False Notes by Anton Rubinstein
555	A273	Danse macabre (Poème symphonique de Camille Saint-Saëns)	pf		1876	Piano, transcr.	arr. of the symphonic poem Danse macabre, Op. 40 by Camille Saint-Saëns
556/1	A17	Die Rose (Lied von Franz Schubert)	pf		1833	Piano, transcr.	arr. of the song Die Rose, D. 745 by Franz Schubert; 1st version of S. 556/2, S. 556/3
556/2	A17	Die Rose (Lied von Franz Schubert)	pf		1838	Piano, transcr.	2nd version of S. 556/1, S. 556/3
556/3	A17	Die Rose (Lied von Franz Schubert)	pf		1837	Piano, transcr.	3rd version of S. 556/1, S. 556/2
557	A45	Lob der Tränen (Lied von Franz Schubert)	pf		1838	Piano, transcr.	arr. of the song Lob der Tränen, D. 711 by Franz Schubert
557a	A42/4	Erlkönig (Lied von Franz Schubert)	pf		1837	Piano, transcr.	arr. of the song Erlkönig, D. 328 by Franz Schubert; 1st version of S. 558/4, S. 558/4a
557b	A42/5	Meeresstille (Lied von Franz Schubert)	pf		1837	Piano, transcr.	arr. of the song Meeres Stille, D. 216 by Franz Schubert; 1st version of S. 558/5
557c	A42/7	Frühlingsglaube (Lied von Franz Schubert)	pf		1837	Piano, transcr.	arr. of the song Frühlingsglaube, D. 686 by Franz Schubert; 1st version of S. 558/7, S. 558/7a
557d	A42/12	Ave Maria (Lied von Franz Schubert)	pf		1837	Piano, transcr.	arr. of the song Ave maria, D. 839 by Franz Schubert; 1st version of S. 558/12
558	A42	Lieder von Franz Schubert (12):	pf		1837–38	Piano, transcr.	
558/1	A42/1	Sei mir gegrüßt (Sois toujours mes seuls amours)	pf		1837–38	Piano, transcr.	arr. of the song Sei mir gegrüsst, D. 741 by Franz Schubert
558/2	A42/2	Auf dem Wasser zu singen (Barcarolle)	pf		1837–38	Piano, transcr.	arr. of the song Auf dem Wasser zu singen, D. 774 by Franz Schubert
558/3	A42/3	Du bist die Ruh' (L'attente)	pf		1837–38	Piano, transcr.	arr. of the song Du bist die Ruh, D. 776 by Franz Schubert; 1st version of S. 558/3a
558/3a	A42/3	Du bist die Ruh' (L'attente)	pf		1876	Piano, transcr.	2nd version of S. 558/3; renumbered from S. 558/3bis
558/4	A42/4	Erlkönig (Le roi des Aulnes)	pf		1837–38	Piano, transcr.	arr. of the song Erlkönig, D. 328 by Franz Schubert; 2nd version of S. 557a, S. 558/4a
558/4a	A42/4	Erlkönig (Le roi des Aulnes)	pf		1876	Piano, transcr.	3rd version of S. 557a, S. 558/4; renumbered from S. 558/4bis
558/5	A42/5	Meeresstille (La mer calme)	pf		1837–38	Piano, transcr.	arr. of the song Meeres Stille, D. 216 by Franz Schubert; 2nd version of S. 557b
558/6	A42/6	Die junge Nonne (La jeune religieuse)	pf		1837–38	Piano, transcr.	arr. of the song Die junge Nonne, D. 828 by Franz Schubert
558/7	A42/7	Frühlingsglaube (Espoir dans le printemps)	pf		1837–38	Piano, transcr.	arr. of the song Frühlingsglaube, D. 686 by Franz Schubert; 2nd version of S. 557c, S. 558/7a
558/7a	A42/7	Frühlingsglaube (Espoir dans le printemps)	pf		1876	Piano, transcr.	3rd version of S. 557c, S. 558/7; renumbered from S. 558/7bis
558/8	A42/8	Gretchen am Spinnrade (Marguerite)	pf		1837–38	Piano, transcr.	arr. of the song Gretchen am Spinnrade, D. 118 by Franz Schubert; 1st version of S. 558/8a
558/8a	A42/8	Gretchen am Spinnrade (Marguerite)	pf		1876	Piano, transcr.	2nd version of S. 558/8; renumbered from S. 558/8bis
558/9	A42/9	Ständchen von Shakespeare (La sérénade de Shakspeare)	pf		1837–38	Piano, transcr.	arr. of the song Ständchen, D. 889 by Franz Schubert; 1st version of S. 558/9a
558/9a	A42/9	Ständchen von Shakespeare (La sérénade de Shakspeare)	pf		1876	Piano, transcr.	2nd version of S. 558/9; renumbered from S. 558/9bis
558/10	A42/10	Rastlose Liebe	pf		1837–38	Piano, transcr.	arr. of the song Rastlose Liebe, D. 138 by Franz Schubert
558/11	A42/11	Der Wanderer (Le pèlerin)	pf		1837–38	Piano, transcr.	arr. of the song Der Wanderer, D. 493 by Franz Schubert; 1st version of S. 558/11a
558/11a	A42/11	Der Wanderer (Le pèlerin)	pf		1876	Piano, transcr.	2nd version of S. 558/11; renumbered from S. 558/11bis
558/12	A42/12	Ave Maria	pf		1837–38	Piano, transcr.	arr. of the song Ave Maria, D. 839 by Franz Schubert; 2nd version of S. 557d
559	A46	Gondelfahrer (Männerquartett von Franz Schubert)	pf		1838	Piano, transcr.	arr. of the chorus Gondelfahrer, D. 809 by Franz Schubert
559a	A49/7	La sérénade de Franz Schubert	pf		1837	Piano, transcr.	arr. of No.4 of the song cycle Schwanengesang, D. 957 by Franz Schubert; 1st version of S. 560/7, S. 560/7a
560	A49	Schwanengesang (Lieder von Franz Schubert)	pf		1838–39	Piano, transcr.	arr. of the song cycle Schwanengesang, D. 957 by Franz Schubert
560/1	A49/1	Die Stadt	pf		1838–39	Piano, transcr.	arr. of No.11 of the song cycle Schwanengesang, D. 957 by Franz Schubert
560/2	A49/2	Das Fischermädchen	pf		1838–39	Piano, transcr.	arr. of No.10 of the song cycle Schwanengesang, D. 957 by Franz Schubert
560/3	A49/3	Aufenthalt	pf		1838	Piano, transcr.	arr. of No.5 of the song cycle Schwanengesang, D. 957 by Franz Schubert
560/4	A49/4	Am Meer	pf		1838–39	Piano, transcr.	arr. of No.12 of the song cycle Schwanengesang, D. 957 by Franz Schubert
560/5	A49/5	Abschied	pf		1838–39	Piano, transcr.	arr. of No.7 of the song cycle Schwanengesang, D. 957 by Franz Schubert
560/6	A49/6	In der Ferne	pf		1838–39	Piano, transcr.	arr. of No.6 of the song cycle Schwanengesang, D. 957 by Franz Schubert
560/7	A49/7	Ständchen	pf		1838	Piano, transcr.	arr. of No.4 of the song cycle Schwanengesang, D. 957 by Franz Schubert; 2nd version of S. 559a, S. 560/7a
560/7a	A49/7	Ständchen	pf		1880	Piano, transcr.	3rd version of S. 559a, S. 560/7
560/8	A49/8	Ihr Bild	pf		1838–39	Piano, transcr.	arr. of No.9 of the song cycle Schwanengesang, D. 957 by Franz Schubert
560/9	A49/9	Frühlingssehnsucht	pf		1838–39	Piano, transcr.	arr. of No.3 of the song cycle Schwanengesang, D. 957 by Franz Schubert
560/10	A49/10	Liebesbotschaft	pf		1838–39	Piano, transcr.	arr. of No.1 of the song cycle Schwanengesang, D. 957 by Franz Schubert
560/11	A49/11	Der Atlas	pf		1838–39	Piano, transcr.	arr. of No.8 of the song cycle Schwanengesang, D. 957 by Franz Schubert
560/12	A49/12	Der Doppelgänger	pf		1838–39	Piano, transcr.	arr. of No.13 of the song cycle Schwanengesang, D. 957 by Franz Schubert
560/13	A49/13	Die Taubenpost	pf		1838–39	Piano, transcr.	arr. of No.14 of the song cycle Schwanengesang, D. 957 by Franz Schubert
560/14	A49/14	Kriegers Ahnung	pf		1838–39	Piano, transcr.	arr. of No.2 of the song cycle Schwanengesang, D. 957 by Franz Schubert
561	A50	Winterreise (12 Lieder von Franz Schubert)	pf		1839	Piano, transcr.	arr. of 12 songs from the cycle Winterreise, D. 911 by Franz Schubert
561/1	A50/1	Gute Nacht	pf		1839	Piano, transcr.	arr. of No.1 from the cycle Winterreise, D. 911 by Franz Schubert
561/2	A50/2	Die Nebensonnen	pf		1839	Piano, transcr.	arr. of No.23 from the cycle Winterreise, D. 911 by Franz Schubert
561/3	A50/3	Mut!	pf		1839	Piano, transcr.	arr. of No.22 from the cycle Winterreise, D. 911 by Franz Schubert
561/4	A50/4	Die Post	pf		1839	Piano, transcr.	arr. of No.13 from the cycle Winterreise, D. 911 by Franz Schubert
561/5	A50/5	Erstarrung	pf		1839	Piano, transcr.	arr. of No.4 from the cycle Winterreise, D. 911 by Franz Schubert
561/6	A50/6	Wasserflut	pf		1839	Piano, transcr.	arr. of No.6 from the cycle Winterreise, D. 911 by Franz Schubert
561/7	A50/7	Der Lindenbaum	pf		1839	Piano, transcr.	arr. of No.5 from the cycle Winterreise, D. 911 by Franz Schubert
561/8	A50/8	Der Leiermann	pf		1839	Piano, transcr.	arr. of No.24 from the cycle Winterreise, D. 911 by Franz Schubert
561/9	A50/9	Täuschung	pf		1839	Piano, transcr.	arr. of No.19 from the cycle Winterreise, D. 911 by Franz Schubert
561/10	A50/10	Das Wirtshaus	pf		1839	Piano, transcr.	arr. of No.21 from the cycle Winterreise, D. 911 by Franz Schubert
561/11	A50/11	Der stürmische Morgen	pf		1839	Piano, transcr.	arr. of No.18 from the cycle Winterreise, D. 911 by Franz Schubert
561/12	A50/12	Im Dorfe	pf		1839	Piano, transcr.	arr. of No.17 from the cycle Winterreise, D. 911 by Franz Schubert
562	A73	Franz Schuberts geistliche Lieder	pf		1840	Piano, transcr.	vol. 2 of Konzerttranskriptionen über 10 geistliche Lieder von Beethoven und Schubert
562/1	A73/1	Litaney	pf		1840	Piano, transcr.	arr. of the song Am Tage Aller Seelen, D. 343 by Franz Schubert
562/2	A73/2	Himmelsfunken	pf		1840	Piano, transcr.	arr. of the song Himmelsfunken, D. 651 by Franz Schubert
562/3	A73/3	Die Gestirne	pf		1840	Piano, transcr.	arr. of the song Die Gestirne, D. 444 by Franz Schubert
562/4	A73/4	Hymne	pf		1840	Piano, transcr.	arr. of No.4 from the incidental music to Rosamunde, D. 797 by Franz Schubert
563	A109	Melodien von Franz Schubert (6):	pf		1844	Piano, transcr.	
563/1	A109/1	Lebe wohl!	pf		1844	Piano, transcr.	
563/2	A109/2	Mädchens Klage	pf		1844	Piano, transcr.	arr. of the song Des Mädchens Klage, D. 191 by Franz Schubert
563/3	A109/3	Das Sterbeglöcklein	pf		1844	Piano, transcr.	arr. of the song Das Zügenglöcklein, D. 871 by Franz Schubert
563/4	A109/4	Trockne Blumen	pf		1844	Piano, transcr.	arr. of No.18 from the song cycle Die schöne Müllerin, D. 795 by Franz Schubert
563/5	A109/5	Ungeduld	pf		1844	Piano, transcr.	arr. of No.7 from the song cycle Die schöne Müllerin, D. 795 by Franz Schubert; 1st version of S. 565/6, S. 565/6a
563/6	A109/6	Die Forelle	pf		1844	Piano, transcr.	arr. of the song Die Forelle, D. 550 by Franz Schubert; 1st version of S. 564
564	A127	Die Forelle (Lied von Franz Schubert)	pf		1846	Piano, transcr.	arr. of the song Die Forelle, D. 550 by Franz Schubert; 2nd version of S. 563/6
565	A128	Müllerlieder von Franz Schubert	pf		1846	Piano, transcr.	
565/1	A128/1	Das Wandern	pf		1846	Piano, transcr.	arr. of No.1 from the song cycle Die schöne Müllerin, D. 795 by Franz Schubert; 1st version of S. 565/1a
565/1a	A128/1	Das Wandern	pf		1879	Piano, transcr.	arr. of No.1 from the song cycle Die schöne Müllerin, D. 795 by Franz Schubert; 2nd (simplified) version of S. 565/1; renumbered from S. 565bis/1
565/2	A128/2	Der Müller und der Bach	pf		1846	Piano, transcr.	arr. of No.19 from the song cycle Die schöne Müllerin, D. 795 by Franz Schubert; 1st version of S. 565/2a
565/2a	A128/2	Der Müller und der Bach	pf		1879	Piano, transcr.	arr. of No.19 from the song cycle Die schöne Müllerin, D. 795 by Franz Schubert; 2nd (simplified) version of S. 565/2; renumbered from S. 565bis/2
565/3	A128/3	Der Jäger	pf		1846	Piano, transcr.	arr. of No.14 from the song cycle Die schöne Müllerin, D. 795 by Franz Schubert; 1st version of S. 565/3a
565/3a	A128/3	Der Jäger	pf		1879	Piano, transcr.	arr. of No.14 from the song cycle Die schöne Müllerin, D. 795 by Franz Schubert; 2nd (simplified) version of S. 565/3; renumbered from S. 565bis/3
565/4	A128/4	Die böse Farbe	pf		1846	Piano, transcr.	arr. of No.17 from the song cycle Die schöne Müllerin, D. 795 by Franz Schubert; 1st version of S. 565/4a
565/4a	A128/4	Die böse Farbe	pf		1879	Piano, transcr.	arr. of No.17 from the song cycle Die schöne Müllerin, D. 795 by Franz Schubert; 2nd (simplified) version of S. 565/4; renumbered from S. 565bis/4
565/5	A128/5	Wohin?	pf		1846	Piano, transcr.	arr. of No.2 from the song cycle Die schöne Müllerin, D. 795 by Franz Schubert; 1st version of S. 565/5a
565/5a	A128/5	Wohin?	pf		1879	Piano, transcr.	arr. of No.2 from the song cycle Die schöne Müllerin, D. 795 by Franz Schubert; 2nd (simplified) version of S. 565/5; renumbered from S. 565bis/5
565/6	A128/6	Ungeduld	pf		1846	Piano, transcr.	arr. of No.7 from the song cycle Die schöne Müllerin, D. 795 by Franz Schubert; 2nd version of S. 563/5, S. 565/6a
565/6a	A128/6	Ungeduld	pf		1879	Piano, transcr.	arr. of No.7 from the song cycle Die schöne Müllerin, D. 795 by Franz Schubert; 3rd (simplified) version of S. 563/5, S. 565/6; renumbered from S. 565bis/6
565a	U14/1	Grosse Fantasie von Franz Schubert	pf	C major	1868	Piano, transcr.	edited with additions to the Fantasie in C major, D. 760 by Franz Schubert
565b	U14/2	Impromptus von F. Schubert (4)	pf		1868	Piano, transcr.	edited, with additions to Nos.2 and 3 of Impromptus, D. 899 by Franz Schubert
566	A133	Liebeslied (Widmung von Robert Schumann)	pf		1848	Piano, transcr.	arr. of No.1 of Myrthen, Op. 25 by Robert Schumann
566a	A133	Liebeslied (Widmung von Robert Schumann)	pf		1850–59?	Piano, transcr.	short draft of S. 566
567	A212	Lieder von Robert Schumann	pf		1861	Piano, transcr.	
567/1	A212/1	An den Sonnenschein	pf		1861	Piano, transcr.	arr. of No.4 of 6 Gedichte, Op. 36 by Robert Schumann
567/2	A212/2	Rotes Röslein	pf		1861	Piano, transcr.	arr. of No.2 of Lieder und Gesänge, Vol.I, Op. 27 by Robert Schumann
568	A257	Frühlingsnacht (Lied von Robert Schumann)	pf		1872	Piano, transcr.	arr. of No.12 of Liederkreis by Robert Schumann
569	A264a	Lieder von Robert und Clara Schumann (10):	pf		1874	Piano, transcr.	
569/1	A264a/1	Weihnachtslied	pf		1874	Piano, transcr.	arr. of No.16 of Liederalbum für die Jugend, Op. 79 by Robert Schumann
569/2	A264a/2	Die wandelnde Glocke	pf		1874	Piano, transcr.	arr. of No.17 of Liederalbum für die Jugend, Op. 79 by Robert Schumann
569/3	A264a/3	Frühlings Ankunft	pf		1874	Piano, transcr.	arr. of No.19 of Liederalbum für die Jugend, Op. 79 by Robert Schumann
569/4	A264a/4	Des Sennen Abschied	pf		1874	Piano, transcr.	arr. of No.22 of Liederalbum für die Jugend, Op. 79 by Robert Schumann
569/5	A264a/5	Er ist's	pf		1874	Piano, transcr.	arr. of No.23 of Liederalbum für die Jugend, Op. 79 by Robert Schumann
569/6	A264a/6	Nur wer die Sehnsucht kennt	pf		1874	Piano, transcr.	arr. of No.3 of Lieder und Gesänge aus Wilhelm Meister, Op. 98a by Schumann
569/7	A264a/7	An die Türen will ich schleichen	pf		1874	Piano, transcr.	arr. of No.5 of Lieder und Gesänge aus Wilhelm Meister, Op. 98a by Schumann
569/8	A264b/1	Warum willst du and're fragen	pf		1874	Piano, transcr.	arr. of No.9 of Gedichte aus Rückerts Liebesfrühling, Op. 12, by Clara Schumann
569/9	A264b/2	Ich hab' in deinem Auge	pf		1874	Piano, transcr.	arr. of No.5 of 6 Lieder, Op. 13, by Clara Schumann
569/10	A264b/3	Geheimes Flüstern hier und dort	pf		1874	Piano, transcr.	arr. of No.3 of 6 Lieder aus Jucunde von Rollet, Op. 23, by Clara Schumann
570	A306	Provenzalisches Minnelied (von Robert Schumann)	pf		1881	Piano, transcr.	arr. of No.4 of Des Sängers Fluch, Op. 139 by Robert Schumann
570a	V16	Polka de salon (Einleitung und Coda zu Smetanas Polka)	pf	F♯ major	1885	Piano, transcr.	additions and revisions to No.1 of 3 Polkas de salon, Op. 7 by Bedřich Smetana
571	A275	Die Rose (Romanze von Louis Spohr)	pf		1876	Piano, transcr.	arr. of Zemire's romance from the opera Zemire und Azor, by Louis Spohr
571a	V15	Valse-Caprice No.3 (Einleitung und Schlußtakte zu Tausigs dritter Valse-Caprice)	pf		1880	Piano, transcr.	additions and revisions to Valse-Caprice No.3 by Carl Tausig; formerly S. 167a
572	A292	Marche hongroise de Szabadi (Revive Szegedin!)	pf		1879	Piano, transcr.	arr. of the Marche héroïque de Szabadi by Jules Massenet.
573	A258	Einleitung und Ungarischer Marsch von Graf Imre Széchényi (Bevezetés és magyar induló Gróf Széchényi Imrétõl )	pf		1872	Piano, transcr.	based on the Ungarischer Marsch by Imre Széchényi
573a	A297	Seconda Mazurka di Tirindelli	pf		1880	Piano, transcr.	additions and revisions to Mazurka No.2 by Pier Adolfo Tirindelli
574	A122	Ouvertüre zur Webers Oper Oberon	pf		1846	Piano, transcr.	arr. of the overture from the opera Oberon, J.306 by Carl Maria von Weber
575	A129	Ouvertüre aus Webers Oper Der Freischütz	pf		1846	Piano, transcr.	arr. of the overture from the opera Der Freischütz, Op. 77 by Carl Maria von Weber
576	A121	Webers Jubelovertüre	pf		1846	Piano, transcr.	arr. of the Jubel-Ouvertüre, Op. 59 by Carl Maria von Weber
576a	—	Konzertstück (von Weber)	pf		1868–70	Piano, transcr.	arr. of the Konzertstück. Op. 79 by Carl Maria von Weber
577/1	A87	I Love (Romanze von Wielhorski)	pf		1842	Piano, transcr.	arr. of the romance I Love by Michał Wielhorski; 2nd version of S. 577/2, S. 577bis, and S. 577ter
577/2	—	Autrefois (Romance du Comte Mikaïl Yourievitch Wielhorsky)	pf		1843	Piano, transcr.	4th version of S. 577/1, S. 577bis, and S. 577ter
577bis	A87	Autrefois (Romance du Comte Mikaïl Yourievitch Wielhorsky)	pf		1842?	Piano, transcr.	1st version of S. 577ter, S. 577/1, and S. 577/2
577ter	A87	Autrefois (Romance du Comte Mikaïl Yourievitch Wielhorsky)	pf		1843?	Piano, transcr.	3rd version of S. 577bis, S. 577/1, and S. 577/2
577a–634b		==== Pianoforte duet ====					
577a	T33	12 Nocturnes (John Field)	pf4h		1877	Piano, 4 hands, arr.	
577a/1	T33/1	Nocturne No. 1	pf4h		1877	Piano, 4 hands, arr.	arr. of Nocturne No.1 in E♭ major, H. 24, by John Field
577a/2	T33/2	Nocturne No.2	pf4h		1877	Piano, 4 hands, arr.	arr. of Nocturne No.2 in C minor, H. 25, by John Field
577a/3	T33/3	Nocturne No.3	pf4h		1877	Piano, 4 hands, arr.	arr. of Nocturne No.3 in A♭ major, H. 26, by John Field
577a/4	T33/4	Nocturne No.4	pf4h		1877	Piano, 4 hands, arr.	arr. of Nocturne No.4 in A major, H. 36, by John Field
577a/5	T33/5	Nocturne No.5	pf4h		1877	Piano, 4 hands, arr.	arr. of Nocturne No.5 in B♭ major, H. 37, by John Field
577a/6	T33/6	Nocturne No.6	pf4h		1877	Piano, 4 hands, arr.	arr. of Nocturne No.6 in F major, H. 40, by John Field
577a/7	T33/7	Nocturne No.7	pf4h		1877	Piano, 4 hands, arr.	arr. of Pastorale in A major, H. 14, by John Field
577a/8	T33/8	Nocturne No.8	pf4h		1877	Piano, 4 hands, arr.	arr. of Romance in E♭ major, H. 30, by John Field
577a/9	T33/9	Nocturne No.9	pf4h		1877	Piano, 4 hands, arr.	arr. of Nocturne No.8 in E minor, H. 46, by John Field
577a/10	T33/10	Nocturne No. 10	pf4h		1877	Piano, 4 hands, arr.	arr. of Nocturne No.17 in E major, H. 65, by John Field
577a/11	T33/11	Nocturne No. 11	pf4h		1877	Piano, 4 hands, arr.	arr. of Nocturne No.11 in E♭ major, H. 56, by John Field
577a/12	T33/12	Nocturne No. 12	pf4h		1877	Piano, 4 hands, arr.	arr. of Nocturne No.18 in E major ("Midi"), H. 13, by John Field
578	B27	Die Legende von der Heiligen Elisabeth:	pf4h		1862–66?	Piano, 4 hands, arr.	arr. from S. 2
578/1	B27/1	Orchester Einleitung	pf4h		1862–66?	Piano, 4 hands, arr.	arr. of Introduction from S. 2
578/2	B27/2	Marsch der Kreuzritter	pf4h		1862–66?	Piano, 4 hands, arr.	arr. of No.3e from S. 2
578/3	B27/3	Der Sturm	pf4h		1862–66?	Piano, 4 hands, arr.	arr. of No.4d from S. 2
578/4	B27/4	Interludium	pf4h		1862–66?	Piano, 4 hands, arr.	arr. of No.6a from S. 2
579	B30	Orchestersätze aus dem Oratorium Christus (2):	pf4h		1866–73?	Piano, 4 hands, arr.	arr. from S. 3
579/1	B30/1	Hirtengespiel an der Krippe	pf4h		1866–73?	Piano, 4 hands, arr.	arr. of No.4 from S. 3
579/2	B30/2	Die heiligen drei Könige	pf4h		1866–73?	Piano, 4 hands, arr.	arr. of No.5 from S. 3
580	B42	Excelsior! (Preludio zu dem Glocken des Strassburger Münsters)	pf4h		1874	Piano, 4 hands, arr.	arr. of prelude from S. 6
581	B31	Aus der Ungarischen Krönungsmesse	pf4h		1869	Piano, 4 hands, arr.	arr. from S. 11
581/1	B31/1	Benedictus	pf4h		1869	Piano, 4 hands, arr.	arr. of No.5 from S. 11
581/2	B31/2	Offertorium	pf4h		1869	Piano, 4 hands, arr.	arr. of No.7 from S. 11
582	B53	O Lamm Gottes!	pf4h		1878–79	Piano, 4 hands, arr.	arr. of S. 504b/7
583	B52	Via Crucis (Les 14 stations de la croix)	pf4h		1878–79	Piano, 4 hands, arr.	arr. of S. 53
584	B6	Fest-Cantate für die Inaugurations-Feier des Beethoven-Denkmals in Bonn	pf4h		1845	Piano, 4 hands, arr.	arr. of S. 67
585	B24	Pastorale (Schnitterchor aus dem Entfesselten Prometheus)	pf4h		1861	Piano, 4 hands, arr.	arr. of No.4 from S. 69/2
586	B34	Gaudeamus igitur (Humoreske)	pf4h		1870?	Piano, 4 hands, arr.	arr. of S. 71a
587	B7	Marche héroique	pf4h		1848?	Piano, 4 hands, arr.	arr. of S. 510
588	B16	Weimars Volkslied	pf4h		1857	Piano, 4 hands, arr.	arr. of S. 313
589	B37	Ce qu'on entend sur la montagne (Symphonic Poem No. 1)	pf4h		1874	Piano, 4 hands, arr.	arr. of S. 95 (3rd version)
590	B20	Tasso: Lamento e Trionfo (Symphonic Poem No. 2)	pf4h		1858	Piano, 4 hands, arr.	arr. of S. 96
591	B12	Les préludes (Symphonic Poem No. 3)	pf4h		1853–58	Piano, 4 hands, arr.	arr. of S. 97
592	B17	Orpheus (Symphonic Poem No. 4)	pf4h		1858	Piano, 4 hands, arr.	arr. of S. 98
593	B18	Prometheus (Symphonic Poem No. 5)	pf4h		1858?	Piano, 4 hands, arr.	arr. of S. 99
594	B38	Mazeppa (Symphonic Poem No. 6)	pf4h		1874	Piano, 4 hands, arr.	arr. of S. 100
595	B13	Festklänge (Symphonic Poem No. 7)	pf4h		1854–61	Piano, 4 hands, arr.	arr. of S. 101
596	B39	Hungaria (Symphonic Poem No. 9)	pf4h		1874	Piano, 4 hands, arr.	arr. of S. 103
596a	B49	Héroïde funèbre (Symphonic Poem No. 8)	pf4h		1877	Piano, 4 hands, arr.	arr. of S. 102
596b	B51	Hunnenschlacht (Symphonic Poem No. 11)	pf4h		1877	Piano, 4 hands, arr.	arr. of S. 105
596c	B44	Die Ideale (Symphonic Poem No. 12)	pf4h		1874–77	Piano, 4 hands, arr.	arr. of S. 106 by Liszt and Giovanni Sgambati
597	B40	Hamlet (Symphonic Poem No. 10)	pf4h		1874	Piano, 4 hands, arr.	arr. of S. 104
598	B55	Von der Wiege bis zum Grabe (From the Cradle to the Grave) (Symphonic Poem No. 13)	pf4h		1881	Piano, 4 hands, arr.	arr. of S. 512
599	B15	Episoden aus Lenau's Faust (2)	pf4h		1856–61?	Piano, 4 hands, arr.	arr. of S. 110
599/1	B15/1	Der nächtliche Zug	pf4h		1856–61	Piano, 4 hands, arr.	arr. of S. 110/1
599/2	B15/2	Der Tanz in der Dorfschenke (Mephisto Waltz)	pf4h		1856–61	Piano, 4 hands, arr.	arr. of S. 110/2a
600	B54	Mephisto Waltz No.2	pf4h		1880–81	Piano, 4 hands, arr.	arr. of S. 515
601–603	B23	Odes funèbres (3):	pf4h		1860–69	Piano, 4 hands, arr.	arr. from S. 112
601	B23/1	Les morts	pf4h		1860	Piano, 4 hands, arr.	arr. of S. 112/1
602	B23/2	La notte	pf4h		1866	Piano, 4 hands, arr.	arr. of S. 112/2
603	B23/3	Le triomphe funèbre du Tasse	pf4h		1866–69	Piano, 4 hands, arr.	arr. of S. 112/3
604/1	B28/1	Boże, coś Polskę	pf4h		1863	Piano, 4 hands, arr.	arr. of S. 113/1
604/2	B28/2	Salve Polonia (Interludium aus dem Oratorium St. Stanislaus)	pf4h		1884	Piano, 4 hands, arr.	arr. of S. 113/2
605	B22	Künstlerfestzug zur Schillerfeier 1859	pf4h		1859	Piano, 4 hands, arr.	arr. of S. 114
606	B19	Festmarsch zur Goethe-Jubiläumfeier	pf4h		1858?	Piano, 4 hands, arr.	arr. of S. 115
607	B21	Festmarsch nach Motiven von E.H.z.S.-C.-G.	pf4h		1858–59	Piano, 4 hands, arr.	arr. of S. 116
608	B33	Rákóczi-Marsch	pf4h		1870	Piano, 4 hands, arr.	arr. of S. 117
609	B32	Ungarischer Marsch zur Krönungsfeier in Ofen-Pest am 8. Juni 1867	pf4h		1870	Piano, 4 hands, arr.	arr. of S. 118
610	B46	Ungarischer Sturmmarsch (Hungarian Battle March)	pf4h		1875	Piano, 4 hands, arr.	arr. of S. 119
611	W7	Epithalam (zu Eduard Reményi's Vermählungsfeier)	pf4h		1872	Piano, 4 hands, arr.	arr. of S. 129; Liszt's authorship doubtful
612	B36	Elegy No. 1	pf4h		1874	Piano, 4 hands, arr.	arr. of S. 196
612a	B43	Weihnachtsbaum	pf4h		1875?	Piano, 4 hands, arr.	arr. of S. 185a; 1st version of S. 613
612a/1	B43/1	Psallite (Altes Weihnachten)	pf4h		1875?	Piano, 4 hands, arr.	arr. of S. 185a/1; 1st version of S. 613/1
612a/2	B43/2	O heilige Nacht!	pf4h		1875?	Piano, 4 hands, arr.	arr. of S. 185a/2; 1st version of S. 613/2
612a/3	B43/3	Die Hirten an der Krippe ("In dulci jubilo")	pf4h		1875?	Piano, 4 hands, arr.	arr. of S. 185a/3; 1st version of S. 613/3
612a/4	B43/4	Adeste fideles (gleichsam als Marsch der heiligen drei Könige)	pf4h		1875?	Piano, 4 hands, arr.	arr. of S. 185a/4; 1st version of S. 613/4
612a/5	B43/5	Scherzoso	pf4h		1875?	Piano, 4 hands, arr.	arr. of S. 185a/5; 1st version of S. 613/5
612a/6	B43/6	Reveille-Matin (Wecker)	pf4h		1875?	Piano, 4 hands, arr.	arr. of S. 185a/6; 1st version of S. 613/6
612a/7	B43/7	Schlummerlied	pf4h		1875?	Piano, 4 hands, arr.	arr. of S. 185a/7; 1st version of S. 613/7
612a/8	B43/8	(Alt-provenzalisches Noel)	pf4h		1875?	Piano, 4 hands, arr.	arr. of S. 185a/8; 1st version of S. 613/8
612a/9	B43/9	(Abendglocken)	pf4h		1875?	Piano, 4 hands, arr.	arr. of S. 185a/9; 1st version of S. 613/9
612a/10	B43/10	(Ehemals)	pf4h		1875?	Piano, 4 hands, arr.	arr. of S. 185a/10; 1st version of S. 613/10
612a/11	B43/11	Ungarisch	pf4h		1875?	Piano, 4 hands, arr.	arr. of S. 185a/11; 1st version of S. 613/11
612a/12	B43/12	Polnisch	pf4h		1875?	Piano, 4 hands, arr.	arr. of S. 185a/12; 1st version of S. 613/12
613	B43	Weihnachtsbaum	pf4h		1876–81	Piano, 4 hands, arr.	arr. of S. 186; 2nd version of S. 612a
613/1	B43/1	Altes Weihnachten (Psalite)	pf4h		1876–81	Piano, 4 hands, arr.	arr. of S. 186/1; 2nd version of S. 612a/1
613/2	B43/2	O heilige Nacht!	pf4h		1876–81	Piano, 4 hands, arr.	arr. of S. 186/2; 2nd version of S. 612a/2
613/3	B43/3	Die Hirten an der Krippe ("In dulci jubilo")	pf4h		1876–81	Piano, 4 hands, arr.	arr. of S. 186/3; 2nd version of S. 612a/3
613/4	B43/4	Adeste fideles (Gleichsam als Marsch der heiligen drei Könige)	pf4h		1876–81	Piano, 4 hands, arr.	arr. of S. 186/4; 2nd version of S. 612a/4
613/5	B43/5	Scherzoso (Man zündet die Kerzen des Baumes an)	pf4h		1876–81	Piano, 4 hands, arr.	arr. of S. 186/5; 2nd version of S. 612a/5
613/6	B43/6	Carillon	pf4h		1876–81	Piano, 4 hands, arr.	arr. of S. 186/6; 2nd version of S. 612a/6
613/7	B43/7	Schlummerlied	pf4h		1876–81	Piano, 4 hands, arr.	arr. of S. 186/7; 2nd version of S. 612a/7
613/8	B43/8	Altes provenzalisches Weihnachtslied	pf4h		1876–81	Piano, 4 hands, arr.	arr. of S. 186/8; 2nd version of S. 612a/8
613/9	B43/9	Abendglocken	pf4h		1876–81	Piano, 4 hands, arr.	arr. of S. 186/9; 2nd version of S. 612a/9
613/10	B43/10	Ehemals	pf4h		1876–81	Piano, 4 hands, arr.	arr. of S. 186/10; 2nd version of S. 612a/10
613/11	B43/11	Ungarisch	pf4h		1876–81	Piano, 4 hands, arr.	arr. of S. 186/11; 2nd version of S. 612a/11
613/12	B43/12	Polnisch	pf4h		1876–81	Piano, 4 hands, arr.	arr. of S. 186/12; 2nd version of S. 612a/12
614	B50	Dem Andenken Petöfis	pf4h		1877	Piano, 4 hands, arr.	arr. of S. 349
615	B1	Grande valse di bravura (La bal de Berne)	pf4h		1836	Piano, 4 hands, arr.	arr. of S. 209
615a	—	Mephisto Waltz No.3	pf4h		1883	Piano, 4 hands, arr.	arr. of S. 216
616	B2	Grand galop chromatique	pf4h		1838	Piano, 4 hands, arr.	arr. of S. 219
617	B56	Csárdás macabre	pf4h		1881–82	Piano, 4 hands, arr.	arr. of S. 224 [by Liszt and János Végh?]
618	W11	Csárdás obstiné	pf4h		1884?	Piano, 4 hands, arr.	arr. of S. 225/2 [Liszt's authorship uncertain]
618a	B14	Vom Fels zum Meer! (Deutscher Siegesmarsch)	pf4h		1853–56?	Piano, 4 hands, arr.	arr. of S. 229
619	B59	Bülow-Marsch	pf4h		1883	Piano, 4 hands, arr.	arr. of S. 230
619a	B48	Festpolonaise	pf4h		1876	Piano, 4 hands, arr.	arr. of S. 230a
620	B3	Hussitenlied (Aus dem 15. Jahrhundert)	pf4h		1840–41	Piano, 4 hands, arr.	arr. of S. 234
621	B41	Hungarian Rhapsodies (6):	pf4h		1857–60	Piano, 4 hands, arr.	arr. of S. 359
621/1	B41/1	Hungarian Rhapsody No. 1	pf4h	F minor	1860	Piano, 4 hands, arr.	arr. of S. 359/1 (based on S. 244/14)
621/2	B41/2	Hungarian Rhapsody No. 2	pf4h	C♯ minor	1860	Piano, 4 hands, arr.	arr. of S. 359/2 (based on S. 244/12)
621/3	B41/3	Hungarian Rhapsody No. 3	pf4h	D major	1860	Piano, 4 hands, arr.	arr. of S. 359/3 (based on S. 244/6)
621/4	B41/4	Hungarian Rhapsody No. 4	pf4h	D minor	1860	Piano, 4 hands, arr.	arr. of S. 359/4 (based on S. 244/2)
621/5	B41/5	Hungarian Rhapsody No. 5 (Héroïde-élégiaque)	pf4h	E minor	1860	Piano, 4 hands, arr.	arr. of S. 359/5 (based on S. 244/5)
621/6	B41/6	Hungarian Rhapsody No. 6 (Pesther Carneval)	pf4h	E♭ major	1860	Piano, 4 hands, arr.	arr. of S. 359/6 (based on S. 244/9)
622	B57	Ungarische Rhapsodie zu den Budapester Munkácsy-Feierlichkeiten	pf4h		1882	Piano, 4 hands, arr.	arr. of S. 244/16
623	W12	Hungarian Rhapsody No. 18	pf4h		1885	Piano, 4 hands, arr.	arr. of S. 244/18 (Liszt's authorship doubtful)
623a	W13	Hungarian Rhapsody No. 19	pf4h		1885?	Piano, 4 hands, arr.	arr. of S. 244/19 (Liszt's authorship doubtful)
624	B8	Fantasie und Fuge über den Choral Ad nos, ad salutarem undam	pf4h		1850	Piano, 4 hands, arr.	arr. of S. 259; see also S. 747a
625	B29	Der Papsthymnus	pf4h		1865	Piano, 4 hands, arr.	arr. of S. 261
626	B60	Magyar király-dal (Ungarisches Königslied)	pf4h		1883	Piano, 4 hands, arr.	arr. of S. 340
627	B9	Grand fantaisie de concert sur des motifs favoris de l'opera La sonnambula	pf4h		1852	Piano, 4 hands, arr.	arr. of S. 393
628	B10	Bénédiction et serment (Deux motifs de Benvenuto Cellini de Berlioz)	pf4h		1852–53	Piano, 4 hands, arr.	arr. of S. 396
628a		Réminiscences de Lucia di Lammermoor	pf4h		1836–40	Piano, 4 hands, arr.	arr. of S. 397; Liszt performed this arrangement with Frank Mori during his 1840–41 tour of the British Isles
628b	B5	Marche et Cavatine de Lucia di Lammermoor	pf4h		1844?	Piano, 4 hands, arr.	arr. of S. 398; renumbered from S. 628a
628c	—	Szózat und Hymnus (2 vaterländische Dichtungen von Vörösmarty and Kölcsey)	pf4h		1873	Piano, 4 hands, arr.	arr. of S. 353 (Liszt's authorship doubtful); renumbered from S. 628b
629	B45	Tscherkessenmarsch aus Glinkas Oper Rußlan und Ludmilla	pf4h		1875	Piano, 4 hands, arr.	arr. of S. 406/2
630	W2	Réminiscences de Robert le diable (Valse infernale)	pf4h		1841–43	Piano, 4 hands, arr.	arr. of S. 413 (Liszt's authorship doubtful)
631	B11	Andante Finale und Marsch aus der Oper König Alfred	pf4h		1853?	Piano, 4 hands, arr.	arr. of S. 421
631/1	B11/1	Andante	pf4h		1853?	Piano, 4 hands, arr.	arr. of S. 421/1
631/2	B11/2	Marsch	pf4h		1853?	Piano, 4 hands, arr.	arr. of S. 421/2
632	B35	Franz Schuberts Märsche (4)	pf4h		1859–70	Piano, 4 hands, arr.	arr. from S. 363
632/1	B35/1	(Vivace)	pf4h	B minor	1859–70	Piano, 4 hands, arr.	arr. of S. 363/1
632/2	B35/2	Trauermarsch	pf4h	E♭ minor	1859–70	Piano, 4 hands, arr.	arr. of S. 363/2
632/3	B35/3	Reitermarsch	pf4h	C major	1859–70	Piano, 4 hands, arr.	arr. of S. 363/3
632/4	B35/4	Ungarischer Marsch	pf4h	C minor	1859–70	Piano, 4 hands, arr.	arr. of S. 363/4
633	B26	À la Chapelle Sixtine (Miserere d'Allegri et Ave verum Corpus de Mozart)	pf4h		1865	Piano, 4 hands, arr.	arr. of S. 461/2
634	B4	Grand septuor de Beethoven	pf4h		1840–42	Piano, 4 hands, arr.	arr. of S. 465
634a	B47	Adagio von Die Zauberflöte (Der welcher wandelt diese Strasse)	pf4h		1875–81?	Piano, 4 hands, arr.	arr. of "Der, welcher wandelt diese Straße voll Beschwerden" from Act II of the opera Die Zauberflöte, K.620 by Wolfgang Amadeus Mozart
634b	B25	Stücke aus Tannhäuser und Lohengrin (2):	pf4h		1862?	Piano, 4 hands, arr.	arr. of S. 445
634b/1	B25/1	Einzug der Gäste auf der Wartburg	pf4h		1862?	Piano, 4 hands, arr.	arr. of S. 445/1a
634b/2	B25/2	Elsas Brautzug zum Münster	pf4h		1862?	Piano, 4 hands, arr.	arr. of S. 445/2
635–657b		==== Two pianofortes ====					
635	C9	Ce qu'on entend sur la montagne (Symphonic Poem No. 1)	2pf		1854–56	Piano, 2 pianos, arr.	arr. of S. 95
636	C10	Tasso: Lamento e Trionfo (Symphonic Poem No.2)	2pf		1854–56	Piano, 2 pianos, arr.	arr. of S. 96
637	C11	Les préludes (Symphonic Poem No.3)	2pf		1855?	Piano, 2 pianos, arr.	arr. of S. 97
638	C12	Orpheus (Symphonic Poem No.4)	2pf		1855–56	Piano, 2 pianos, arr.	arr. of S. 98
639	C14	Prometheus (Symphonic Poem No.5)	2pf		1855–56	Piano, 2 pianos, arr.	arr. of S. 99
640	C13	Mazeppa (Symphonic Poem No.6)	2pf		1855	Piano, 2 pianos, arr.	arr. of S. 100
641	C7	Festklänge (Symphonic Poem No.7)	2pf		1853	Piano, 2 pianos, arr.	arr. of S. 101
642	C15	Héroïde funèbre (Symphonic Poem No.8)	2pf		1854–56	Piano, 2 pianos, arr.	arr. of S. 102
643	C16	Hungaria (Symphonic Poem No.9)	2pf		1855–56	Piano, 2 pianos, arr.	arr. of S. 103
644	C22	Hamlet (Symphonic Poem No. 10)	2pf		1858–60	Piano, 2 pianos, arr.	arr. of S. 104
645	C21	Hunnenschlacht (Symphonic Poem No. 11)	2pf		1857–60	Piano, 2 pianos, arr.	arr. of S. 105
646	C17	Die Ideale (Symphonic Poem No. 12)	2pf		1857–58	Piano, 2 pianos, arr.	arr. of S. 106
647	C19	Faust Symphony (Eine Faust-Symphonie)	2pf		1856	Piano, 2 pianos, arr.	arr. of S. 108
648	C20	Dante Symphony (Eine Symphonie zu Dantes Divina Commedia)	2pf		1856–57	Piano, 2 pianos, arr.	arr. of S. 109
649	C6	Fantasie über Motiven aus Beethovens Ruinen von Athen	2pf		1852	Piano, 2 pianos, arr.	arr. of S. 122
650	C8	Piano Concerto No. 1	2pf	E♭ major	1853–56?	Piano, 2 pianos, arr.	arr. of S. 124
651	C23	Piano Concerto No. 2	2pf	A major	1859	Piano, 2 pianos, arr.	arr. of S. 125
652	C24	Totentanz	2pf		1859–65?	Piano, 2 pianos, arr.	arr. of S. 126ii
652a	C25	Rákóczi-Marsch	2pf		1870	Piano, 2 pianos, arr.	arr. of S. 117
653	C5	Franz Schuberts Grosse Fantasie	2pf	C major	1851–62?	Piano, 2 pianos, arr.	arr. of S. 366
654/1	C2	Hexaméron (Morceaux de concert. Grandes variations de bravoure sur la marche des Puritains de Bellini)	2pf		1840	Piano, 2 pianos, arr.	arr. of S. 392; 1st version
654/2	C2	Hexaméron (Morceaux de concert. Grandes variations de bravoure sur la marche des Puritains de Bellini)	2pf		1870?	Piano, 2 pianos, arr.	arr. of S. 392; 2nd version
655	C3	Réminiscences de Norma	2pf		1845–74?	Piano, 2 pianos, arr.	arr. of S. 394
656	C26	Réminiscences de Don Juan (Grande fantaisie)	2pf		1876–77	Piano, 2 pianos, arr.	arr. of S. 418
657	C4	Symphony No. 9 de Beethoven [Beethoven]	2pf	D minor	1851	Piano, 2 pianos, arr.	arr. of the Symphony No.9, Op. 125 by Ludwig van Beethoven; arr. for pf as S. 464/9
657a/1	C27	Piano Concerto No. 3 [Beethoven]	2pf	C minor	1878–79	Piano, 2 pianos, arr.	arr. of the Piano Concerto No.3, Op. 37 by Ludwig van Beethoven; includes new cadenza for 1st movement, S. 389a
657a/2	C28	Piano Concerto No. 4 [Beethoven]	2pf	G major	1878–79	Piano, 2 pianos, arr.	arr. of the Piano Concerto No.4, Op. 58 by Ludwig van Beethoven
657a/3	C29	Piano Concerto No. 5 [Beethoven]	2pf	E♭ major	1878–79	Piano, 2 pianos, arr.	arr. of the Piano Concerto No.5, Op. 73 by Ludwig van Beethoven
657b	C30	Bülow-Marsch	2pf8h		1884	Piano, 2 pianos, arr.	arr. of S. 230
658–676		==== Organ ====					
658	E15	Evocation á la Chapelle Sixtine	org/harm		1862–65?	Organ, arr.	arr. of S. 461
659	E14	Ave Maria d'Arcadelt	org/harm		1862–63	Organ, arr.	arr. of S. 183/2
660/1	E9	Einleitung und Fuge (aus der Motette Ich hatte viel Bekümmernis)	org/harm		1860–66	Organ, arr.	arr. of the introduction and fugue from the cantata Ich hatte viel Bekümmernis, BWV 21 by Johann Sebastian Bach
660/2	E5	Andante (Aus tiefer Not)	org/harm		1856–60?	Organ, arr.	arr. of part of the cantata Aus tiefer Noth schrei ich zu dir, BWV 38 by Johann Sebastian Bach
661	E13	Adagio vom Bach	org/harm		1861–63	Organ, arr.	arr. of the 3rd movement of Violin Sonata No. 4, BWV 1017 by Johann Sebastian Bach
662/1	E16/1	Prelude	org	E minor	1862–63?	Organ, arr.	arr. of No.4 of the Preludes, Op. 28 by Frédéric Chopin
662/2	E16/2	Prelude	org	E major	1862–63?	Organ, arr.	arr. of No.9 of the Preludes, Op. 28 by Frédéric Chopin
663	E21	Regina coeli laetare	org/harm		1865	Organ, arr.	arr. of the motet Regina coeli laetare by Orlande de Lassus
663a	E25	Einleitung zur Legende von der heiligen Elisabeth	org/harm		1872	Organ, arr.	arr. by Liszt and Carl Müller-Hartung of the introduction from S. 2
664/1	E19b/1	Tu es Petrus aus dem Oratorio Christus	org/harm		1867	Organ, arr.	arr. of No.8 from S. 3; 1st version of S. 664/2
664/2	E19b/2	Tu es Petrus aus dem Oratorio Christus	org		1867	Organ, arr.	arr. of movt. VIII from S. 3; 2nd (simplified) version of S. 664/1
665	E35	San Francesco	org		1880	Organ, arr.	arr. of the prelude from S. 4/2
666	E26	Preludio (Excelsior!)	org (+ ch)		1874–75	Choral	arr. of prelude from S. 6; see also version for org without ch S. 268a
667	E23	Offertorium aus der Ungarischen Krönungsmesse	org/harm		1868?	Organ, arr.	arr. of No.5 from S. 11
667a	—	Psalm 18 (Coeli enarrant gloriam Dei / Die Himmel erzählen die Ehre Gottes)	org		1860	Organ, arr.	arr. of S. 14/1
667b/1	—	Gebet (Ave Maria I)	org		1842?	Organ, arr.	arr. of S. 20/1
667b/2	E4	Ave Maria I	org		1856–59?	Organ, arr.	arr. of S. 20/2; incomplete sketch as S. 701n
667c	E24	Ave Maria II	harm	D major	1869	Organ, arr.	arr. of S. 38
668	E18	Slavimo slavno, Slaveni!	org		1863	Organ, arr.	arr. of S. 33
668a	E27/2a	Ave maris stella	harm		1871	Organ, arr.	arr. of S. 34; 1st version of S. 669/2
669	E27	Kirchenhymnen (2)	org/harm		1877	Organ, arr.	
669/1	E27/1	Salve Regina	org/harm		1877	Organ, arr.	
669/2	E27/2b	Ave maris stella	org/harm		1877	Organ, arr.	arr. of S. 34; 2nd version of S. 668a
669a	—	Deutsche Kirchenlieder (7):	v ch pf/org		1878–1879	Choral	arr. from S. 50
669a/1	—	Es segne uns Gott	ch org		1878–79	Choral	arr. of S. 50/1
669a/2	—	Gott sei gnädig (Der Kirchensegen)	v/ch org		1878–79	Choral	arr. of S. 50/2
669a/3	—	Nun ruhen alle Wälder	v org		1878–79	Vocal	arr. of S. 50/3
669a/4	—	O Haupt voll Blut und Wunden	v org		1878–79	Vocal	arr. of S. 50/4
669a/5	—	O Lamm Gottes!	v pf/org		1878–79	Vocal	arr. of S. 50/5
669a/6	—	Was Gott tut, das ist wohlgetan	v org		1878–79	Vocal	arr. of S. 50/6
669a/7	—	Wer nur den lieben Gott läßt walten	v org		1878–79	Vocal	arr. of S. 50/7
669b	E31	Via Crucis (Les 14 stations de la croix)	org		1876–79	Organ, arr.	arr. of S. 53
669c	—	O Roma nobilis	org		1878–79	Organ, arr.	arr. of S. 54
670	E34	Rosario	org/harm		1879	Organ, arr.	arr. from S. 56
670/1	E34/1	Mysteria gaudiosa	org/harm		1879	Organ, arr.	arr. of S. 56/1
670/2	E34/2	Mysteria dolorosa	org/harm		1879	Organ, arr.	arr. of S. 56/2
670/3	E34/3	Mysteria gloriosa	org/harm		1879	Organ, arr.	arr. of S. 56/3
671	E40	In domum Domini ibimus (Zum Haus des Herrn ziehen wir)	org		1884	Organ, arr.	arr. of S. 57
671a	J44	Zur Trauung	org		1883?	Organ, arr.	arr. of S. 60
672/1	E6/1	Weimars Volkslied	org		1857–63?	Organ, arr.	arr. of S. 313; 1st version of S. 672/2
672/2	E6/2	Weimars Volkslied	org/harm		1872–73?	Organ, arr.	arr. of S. 313; 2nd version of S. 672/1
672a	E11	Orpheus (Symphonic Poem No.4)	org/harm		1860–72	Organ, arr.	arr. of S. 98
672b	E8	Einleitung, Fuge und Magnificat aus der Symphonie zu Dantes Divina commedia	org/harm		1860	Organ, arr.	arr. by Liszt [and Gottschalg?] of S. 109
672c	E30	Angelus! Prière aux anges gardiens	harm		1877–82	Organ, arr.	arr. of S. 163/1
672d	E22	Consolations (4):	org/harm		1866–79	Organ, arr.	arr. from S. 172
672d/1	E22/1	(Lento placido)	org/harm	A major	1879?	Organ, arr.	arr. of S. 172/3
672d/2	E22/2	(Adagio)	org/harm	D♭ major	1866–67?	Organ, arr.	arr. of S. 172/4 by Liszt and Gottschalg
672d/3	E22/3	(Andantino)	org/harm	E major	1872–73?	Organ, arr.	arr. of S. 172/5 by Liszt and Gottschalg
672d/4	E22/4	(Trôstung)	org/harm	E major	1879?	Organ, arr.	arr. of S. 172/6
673	E17	Variationen über das Motiv von Bach	org		1862–63	Organ, arr.	arr. of S. 180
674	E37	A magyarok Istene (Ungarns Gott)	org/harm		1881	Organ, arr.	arr. of S. 339
674a	E36	O sacrum convivium	org/harm		1881–85?	Organ, arr.	arr. of S. 58
674b	—	Ave Maria IV	org/harm		1881	Organ, arr.	arr. of S. 341
674c	—	Nun danket alle Gott	org		1884	Organ, arr.	arr. of S. 61
674d	E42	Ave verum corpus de Mozart	org		1886	Organ, arr.	arr. of the Ave verum corpus, K.618 by Wolfgang Amadeus Mozart; arr. for pf as S. 461a
675	E2	Kirchliche Fest-Ouvertüre	org/pfped		1852	Organ, arr.	arr. of the Kirchliche Fest-Ouvertüre über den Choral Ein feste Burg ist unser Gott by Otto Nicolai
675a	V10	In der Christmette	vn org		1873?	Organ, arr.	corrections to No.1 of 5 Charakterstücke, Op. 3, by Alexander Ritter
675b	V18	Davidsbündlertänze	org		1870?	Organ, arr.	arr. by Gottschalg and Liszt of No.14 of the Davidsbündlertänze, Op. 6 by Robert Schumann
675c/1	E29	Agnus Dei della Messa da Requiem di Giuseppe Verdi	org/harm		1877–78	Organ, arr.	based on No.5 of the Requiem by Giuseppe Verdi; 1st version of S. 675c/2; arr. of S. 437/1
675c/2	E29	Agnus Dei della Messa da Requiem di Giuseppe Verdi	org/harm		1883	Organ, arr.	2nd version of S. 675c/1; arr. of S. 437/2
676/1	E10a	Chor der jüngeren Pilger (Der Gnade Heil)	org/harm		1860	Organ, arr.	based on the chorus "Heil! Heil! Der Gnade Wunder Heil!" from Act III of the opera Tannhäuser, WWV 70 by Richard Wagner; 1st version of S. 676/2; arr. of S. 443/1
676/2	E10b	Chor der jüngeren Pilger (Der Gnade Heil)	org/harm		1862	Organ, arr.	2nd version of S. 676/1; arr. of S. 443/2
677–679		==== Organ with other instruments ====					
677	F2	Hosannah (Alleluja del Cantico del sol)	org (+ tbn)		1862–63	Organ, chamber, arr.	arr. of 'Alleluja' from S. 4/1
678	F3	Aus der Ungarischen Krönungsmesse	vn org/harm		1871	Organ, chamber, arr.	arr. of extracts from S. 11
678/1	F3/1	Benedictus	vn org/harm		1871	Organ, chamber, arr.	arr. of S. 11/5
678/2	F3/2	Offertorium	vn org/harm		1871	Organ, chamber, arr.	arr. of S. 11/7
679	F1	Cujus animam aus Rossinis Stabat Mater	tbn org		1860–70?	Organ, chamber, arr.	arr. of "Cujus animam" from Stabat Mater by Gioacchino Rossini; arr. for ten org as S. 682; for pf as S. 553/1
680–685		==== Vocal arrangements ====					
680	K3	Ave maris stella	v org/harm	D major	1868	Organ, vocal, arr.	arr. of S. 34/2
681	K4	Ave Maria II	v org/harm		1869	Organ, vocal, arr.	arr. of S. 38
682	K5	Cujus animam aus Rossinis Stabat Mater	ten org		1874?	Organ, vocal, arr.	arr. of "Cujus animam" from Stabat Mater by Gioacchino Rossini; arr. for tbn org as S. 682; for pf as S. 553/1
683	N57	Serbisches Lied (Ein Mädchen sitzt am Meeresstrand)	v pf		1858?	Piano, vocal, arr.	
683a	K10	Gebet	v org		1883?	Organ, vocal, arr.	arr. of the song 'by Francis Korbay; also arr. for v orch as S. 368/2
684	N2	Barcarole vénitienne de Pantaleoni	v pf		1840	Piano, vocal, arr.	arr. of the song by Luigi Pantaleoni
685	N47	Es hat geflammt die ganze Nacht (Lied der Grossherzogin Marie Pavlovna)	v pf		1849–54	Piano, vocal, arr.	arr. of the song by Maria Pavlovna, Grand Duchess of Russia
686		==== Recitations ====					
686	P4	Helges Treue	nar pf		1860	Vocal, recitation, arr.	arr. of the ballad Helges Treue, Op. 1 by Felix Draeseke
687–768		=== Appendix ===					
687–701		==== Unfinished works ====					
687	Q13	Sardanapalo	vv ch orch		1846–55?	Opera, unfinished	unfinished sketches for an opera, based on Byron's Sardanapalus; completed by David Trippett
688	Q17	Die Legende vom heiligen Stanislaus	vv ch orch		1869–85	Choral, unfinished	unfinished oratorio; extracts used in S. 16/1, S. 113/2, S. 518, S. 519; fragment arr. for pf as S. 688a
688a	Q17	Die Legende vom heiligen Stanislaus	pf		1868?	Piano, unfinished	arr. from S. 688; incomplete sketches
689	Q14	Singe wem Gesang gegeben	mch orch		1848?	Choral, unfinished	orchestrated by Liszt and August Conradi; incomplete
689a	Q9	Manfred	ch orch		1842–44	Choral, unfinished	incomplete
690	Q1	Symphonie révolutionnaire	orch		1830–53	Orchestral, unfinished	incomplete sketches; 1st movement rev. as S. 102; 5th movement rev. as S. 703
690f/2	Q13	Drei Ungarische Rhapsodien symphonisch bearbeiter No.2	pf		?	Piano, unfinished	The Hugo-Songs Sketchbook (N 7 folder in the Goethe und Schiller archive) consists of the Zigeuner-Epos S. 695b set, and on No.6's MS, Liszt wrote a couple of passages in red crayon which was later taken for some orchestral arrangements called 3 Ungarische Rhapsodien. (No.3 is now lost so is the last page of No.2). Like Zigeuner-Epos No.6, Liszt reused the themes from S. 242/6 and S. 242/12 for No.2 and additionally he reused the friska theme (which wasn't in Zigeuner-Epos No.6).
691#	—	De Profundis	pf orch		1834	Orchestral, unfinished	renumbered as S. 121a
692	S49	Violin Concerto	vn orch		1860	Orchestral, unfinished	lost
692a	Q18	Die vier Jahreszeiten	2vn va vc		1880?	Chamber, unfinished	incomplete sketches; formerly S. 719
692b/1	S22	Piano Sonata	pf	F minor	1880	Piano, unfinished	the first page of S. 725/1 (now lost), copied by Liszt in 1880
692b/2	—	Piano Sonata	pf	C minor	1836	Piano, unfinished	the first 3 bars of S. 725/2, copied from memory in a letter from Liszt to his mother
692c	—	Allegro maestoso (Etude No. 13)	pf	F♯ major	1826	Piano, unfinished	incomplete sketches
692d	—	Rákóczi-Marsch	pf		1839–40	Piano, unfinished	simplified arr. of S. 242a; incomplete sketches
692e	—	Winzerchor aus den entfesselten Prometheus	pf		1850?	Piano, unfinished	arr. of No.5 from S. 69; incomplete sketches
692n	—	Klavierstück in Es-moll	pf		1849	Piano, unfinished	arr. of No.3 from S. 172/3; incomplete sketches
693	Q12	Marches dans le genre hongrois (2):	pf		1840?	Piano, unfinished	incomplete sketches
693/1	Q12/1	March No. 1	pf	D minor	1840?	Piano, unfinished	incomplete sketches
693/2	Q12/2	March No.2	pf	B♭ minor	1840?	Piano, unfinished	incomplete sketches
693a	—	Die Legende von der Heiligen Elisabeth:	pf		1862	Piano, unfinished	arr. from S. 2
693a/1	—	Das Rosenmirakel	pf		1862	Piano, unfinished	arr. of S. 2/2c
693a/2	—	Der Sturm	pf		1862	Piano, unfinished	arr. of S. 2/4d
694	Q8	Grande paraphrase de concert sur God Save the Queen et Rule Britannia (Fantasie sur thèmes anglais)	pf orch		1841	Orchestral, unfinished	partly based on S. 235, using the themes of the British national anthem and Rule Britannia by Thomas Arne; fragment only survives (completed by Leslie Howard as Fantasy on English Themes); arr. for pf4h as S. 755b, and for vn va vc pf as S. 718e
695	A100	Klavierstück	pf	F major	1843	Piano, unfinished	
695a#	—	Litanies de Marie	pf		1846–47	Piano, unfinished	renumbered as S. 171e
695b	—	Zigeuner-Epos (11):	pf		1848?	Piano, unfinished	sketches
695b/1	—	(Lento)	pf	C minor	1848?	Piano, unfinished	sketches
695b/2	—	(Andantino)	pf	C major	1848?	Piano, unfinished	sketches
695b/3	—	(Sehr langsam)	pf	D♭ major	1848?	Piano, unfinished	sketches
695b/4	—	(Animato)	pf	C♯ major	1848?	Piano, unfinished	sketches
695b/5	—	(Tempo giusto)	pf	D♭ major	1848?	Piano, unfinished	sketches
695b/6	—	(Lento)	pf	G minor	1848?	Piano, unfinished	sketches
695b/7	—	Tempo di marca	pf	A minor	1848?	Piano, unfinished	sketches
695b/8	—	(Adagio sostenuto a capriccio)	pf	D major	1848?	Piano, unfinished	sketches
695b/9	—	(Andante cantabile quasi adagio)	pf	E♭ major	1848?	Piano, unfinished	sketches
695b/10	—	(Lento)	pf	F minor	1848?	Piano, unfinished	sketches
695b/11	—	(Lento)	pf	A minor	1848?	Piano, unfinished	incomplete sketches
695c	Q11b	Romancero espagnol	pf		1845	Piano, unfinished	formerly S. 738.
695d	T5	Rêves et fantaisies	pf		1850-51	Piano, unfinished	deleted; renumbered as S. 242/23
695e	Q21	Petite valse ("Nachspiel zu den drei vergessenen Walzer")	pf		1884?	Piano, unfinished	incomplete sketches; possibly intended for S. 215
695f	—	Cadenza	pf		1883–85?	Piano, unfinished	for S. 514
696	A337	Mephisto Waltz No.4	pf		1885	Piano, unfinished	2nd version of S. 216b; unfinished draft of new Andantino section added before final bars of S. 216b
697	A90	Fantasie über Themen aus Mozarts Figaro und Don Giovanni	pf		1842	Piano, unfinished	based on themes from the operas Le nozze di Figaro, K.492 and Don Giovanni, K.527 by Mozart; unfinished; completions by Ferruccio Busoni and Leslie Howard
698	Q19	La mandragore (Ballade de l'opera Jean de Nivelle)	pf		1881	Piano, unfinished	arr. of "Tant que le jour dure" from the opera Jean de Nivelle by Léo Delibes; incomplete
699#	—	La notte	pf		1864–66	Piano, unfinished	renumbered as S. 516a
700	Q7	Variations sur le Carnaval de Venise	pf		1843	Piano, unfinished	based on the Il carnevale di Venezia, Op. 10 by Niccolò Paganini; incomplete
700a/i	A113	Grande Fantaisie sur des thèmes de Paganini	pf		1845	Piano, unfinished	using themes from the Violin Concerto No.2, Op. 7, Paganini's 9th Caprice from his 24 Caprices and Il carnevale di Venezia, Op. 10 by Niccolò Paganini; unfinished; completed by Imre Mezö; 1st version of S. 700a/ii
700a/ii	A113	Variations de bravoure sur des thèmes de Paganini	pf		1845	Piano, unfinished	2nd version of S. 700a/i
700f	Q4	La belle en robe des Dimanches	v pf		1830–39?	Vocal, unfinished	incomplete
700g	J44	Zur Trauung	v 2pf		1883–87?	Vocal, unfinished	arr. of S. 60
700j	M14/1	Titan (Auf des Athos blauen Felsenspitzen)	v pf		1842	Vocal, unfinished	1st version of S. 79/1; pf part incomplete
701	N15	Den Felsengipfel stieg ich einst hinan	v pf		1843?	Vocal, unfinished	
701a	Q2	Allegro di bravura	orch		1830	Orchestral, unfinished	arr. of S. 151 [by Liszt?]; incomplete sketch
701b	Q5	Marie-Poème en 6 chants	pf/(str?)		1837	Piano, unfinished	incomplete sketch
701c	—	Andante sensibilissimo	pf		1880–86	Piano, unfinished	incomplete sketch
701d	Q16	Melodie in Dorische Tonart (Prose des Morts)	pf		1861	Piano, unfinished	incomplete sketch; based on the Dies irae
701e	—	Album Leaf ("Dante fragment")	pf		1837	Piano, unfinished	incomplete sketch
701f	—	Album Leaf ("Glasgow fragment")	pf		1841?	Piano, unfinished	incomplete sketch
701g	A253	Polnisch	pf		1876?	Piano, unfinished	sketch
701h/1	—	Valse infernale	pf		1841?	Piano, unfinished	arr. of theme of the Valse infernale (Act III, No.10) from the opera Robert le diable by Giacomo Meyerbeer; incomplete sketch
701h/2	—	Album Leaf	pf		1841	Piano, unfinished	arr. of an unidentified operatic aria and one sketched variation; incomplete sketch
701j	—	La Charité	pf		1847	Piano, unfinished	incomplete sketch for S. 552a; originally intended for S. 172a
701k	—	Korrekturblatt	pf		1882	Piano, unfinished	incomplete sketch for S. 199a
701l	—	Album Leaf ("Weimar fragment")	pf		1886?	Piano, unfinished	incomplete sketch
701m	—	Trio	vn vc pf	G minor	1886?	Chamber, unfinished	incomplete sketch for 2 Harmonies poétiques et religieuses
701n	—	Korrekturblatt	org		1853?	Piano, unfinished	incomplete sketch for S. 667b/2
701o	R1	Scherzo	pf		1830	Piano, unfinished	incomplete
701v	—	Marche de Prozinsky	pf	C♯ minor	1846	Piano, unfinished	incomplete sketch for S. 171d
701w	—	Tasso, Lamento e Trionfo	pf		1856	Piano, unfinished	abandoned arr. of S. 96
702–768		==== Doubtful or lost ====					
702–707		===== Sacred choral works =====					
702	S1	Tantum ergo	ch		1822	Choral, sacred	lost
703	Q15	Psalm 2 (Quare fremuerunt gentes et populi)	ten ch orch		1851	Choral, sacred	incomplete sketches; originally intended as 5th movement of S. 690
704	—	Requiem (on the death of Emperor Maximilian of Mexico)	vv ch ?orch		1867?	Choral, sacred	lost
705	—	The Creation	vv ch ?orch		1867?	Choral, sacred	lost
706	T45	Benedictus	ch		?	Choral, sacred	unrealized project
707	—	Excelsior	ch?		?	Choral, sacred	unrealized project
708a–708b		===== Secular choral works =====					
708a	L6	Rinaldo	ten mch orch		1848	Choral, secular	cantata to words by Goethe, based on music by an unidentified composer (maybe Brahms?); orchestrated by Liszt and August Conradi as S. 708b
708b	L6	Rinaldo	ten mch pf		1848	Choral, secular	arr. of S. 708a by Liszt and August Conradi
709–712		===== For orchestra =====					
709#	—	Salve Polonia	orch		1863	Orchestral	renumbered as S. 113
710	S41	Funeral March	orch		1850	Orchestral	lost; possibly the same as S. 102 or S. 761
711	S62	Csárdás macabre	orch		1882?	Orchestral	lost; reconstruction by G. Darvos not based on authentic material
712	W9	Romance oubliée	orch		1881	Orchestral	arr. of S. 527; Liszt's authorship doubtful
713–716		===== For piano and orchestra =====					
713/1	S8	Piano Concerto	pf orch	A minor	1825?	Orchestral, piano	lost; not the same as S. 713/2
713/2	S9	Piano Concerto	pf orch		1825?	Orchestral, piano	lost; not the same as S. 713/1
714	Q20	Ungarische Zigeunerweisen [Konzert im ungarischen Stil]	pf orch		1885	Orchestral, piano	formerly S. 126a; by Sophie Menter, orch. by Tchaikovsky
715	S19	Piano Concerto (in the Italian style)	pf orch		1830–39?	Orchestral, piano	lost
716	—	Grande fantaisie symphonique	pf orch (?)		?	Orchestral, piano	Deleted; see S. 120
717–723a		===== Other instrumental works =====					
717#	D2	Trio	vn vc pf	D♭ major	1825	Chamber	deleted; renumbered as S. 126c
718	S11	Quintet	2vn va vc db?		1825	Chamber	lost
718a	—	Duo on Rossini's Semiramide	vn pf		1827	Chamber	based on themes from the opera Semiramide by Gioachino Rossini; lost
718b	—	The Fall of Paris – a Military Air with Variations	fl pf		1827	Chamber	lost
718c	—	Fantasia	vn pf		1827	Chamber	lost
718d	—	Un petit morceau	vn pf		1829	Chamber	lost
718e	—	Sextetto	2vn 2va 2vc		1835 or earlier	Chamber	lost
718f	—	Grand Fantasie on God Save the Queen and Rule Britannia	vn va vc pf		1841	Chamber	arr. of S. 694; doubtful
719#	—	Die vier Jahreszeiten	2vn va vc		1880?	Chamber	renumbered as S. 692a
720	S18	Allegro moderato	vn pf	E major	1829	Chamber	lost
721	S63	Prelude	vn (+ pf?)		1882	Chamber	lost
722#	—	La notte	vn pf		1864–66	Chamber	renumbered as S. 377a
723#	—	Tristia	vn vc pf		1880?	Chamber	renumbered as S. 378a, S. 378b, S. 378c
723a#	W6	Postlude (on a theme from Orpheus)	?		1871	Chamber	based on S. 98; now attributed to Leopold Alexander Zellner
724–754		===== For piano solo =====					
724/1	S3	Rondo	pf		1824	Piano	lost; possibly S. 152?
724/2	S4	Fantasia	pf		1824	Piano	lost
725/1	S5	Piano Sonata	pf	F minor	1825	Piano	lost; only several bars were copied down from memory later by Liszt
725/2	S6	Piano Sonata	pf	C minor	1825	Piano	lost; only three bars were copied down from memory in a letter from Liszt to his mother
725/3	S7	Piano Sonata	pf		1825	Piano	lost
726	—	Etude	pf		?	Piano	lost
726a	S23	Valse	pf	E major	1835	Piano	lost
727#	—	Prélude omnitonique	pf		1844	Piano	renumbered as S. 166e
728#	—	Sospiri!	pf		1879	Piano	renumbered as S. 192/5
729	—	Tantum ergo	pf		1869	Piano	lost; possibly arr. of S. 42 or S. 702
730	—	Dem Andenken Petöfis	pf		1877	Piano	renumbered as S. 195
731#	—	Valse élégiaque	pf		1839	Piano	renumbered as S. 210
732#	—	Valse oubliée No.4	pf		1884	Piano	renumbered as S. 215/4
733#	—	Marche hongroise	pf	E♭ minor	1844	Piano	renumbered as S. 233b
734#	—	Ländler	pf		1879	Piano	renumbered as S. 211a
735#	—	Air cosaque	pf		1879	Piano	renumbered as S. 249c
736	W16	Kerepsi csárdás	pf		?	Piano	lost; Liszt's authorship doubtful
737	W15	Morceaux en style de danse ancien hongrois (3)	pf		1850	Piano	manuscript lost; Liszt's authorship doubtful
738#	A114	Grosse Konzertfantasie über spanische Weisen	pf		1844	Piano	renamed and renumbered as S. 695c.
739	S38	Corolian Overture	pf		1846–47	Piano, arr.	arr. of Coriolan, Op. 62 by Ludwig van Beethoven; lost
740	S39	Egmont Overture	pf		1846–47	Piano, arr.	arr. of the overture from the incidental music to Egmont, Op. 84 by Ludwig van Beethoven; lost
741	S37	Le carnaval romain	pf		1844–49?	Piano, arr.	arr. of the overture Le carnaval romain, H. 95 by Hector Berlioz; lost
742#	—	Duettino de La favorite	pf		1847	Piano, arr.	renumbered as S. 400a
743	S55	Chœur des soldats de Faust	pf		1864	Piano, arr.	arr. of the soldiers' chorus from Act IV of the opera Faust by Charles Gounod; lost
743a	S31	Fantaisie sur des thèmes de l'opéra Guitarero	pf		1841	Piano, arr.	based on themes from the opera Guitarrero by Fromental Halévy; lost
744	S36	Dom Sebastien (Paraphrase de concert)	pf		1843–44?	Piano, arr.	based on themes from Act IV of the opera Dom Sebastien by Theodor Kullak; lost
745#	—	Marche funèbre	pf		1827	Piano, arr.	renumbered as S. 226a
746	—	Andante maestoso	pf		?	Piano, arr.	lost
747	W3	Poco adagio	pf		1847?	Piano, arr.	arr. from S. 9; lost; Liszt's authorship uncertain
747a	—	Fantasie und Fuge über den Choral Ad nos, ad salutarem undam	pf		1862?	Piano, arr.	based on a theme from the opera Le prophète by Giacomo Meyerbeer; arr. from S. 259 or 259a; lost; apparently never notated but performed by Liszt
748	S35	Die Zauberflöte	pf		1843?	Piano, arr.	arr. of the overture to the opera Die Zauberflöte, K.620 by Wolfgang Amadeus Mozart; lost
749	S56	Preussischer Armeemarsch	pf		1866?	Piano, arr.	arr. of an unidentified composition, attributed to "Radovsky"; lost
750#	—	Introduction et variations sur une marche du Siège de Corinthe	pf		1830?	Piano, arr.	renumbered as S. 421a
751	—	Fantaisie sur des thèmes de Maometto et Mose (Maometto-Fantasie)	pf		1839–41	Piano, arr.	lost, but recently rediscovered; based on themes from the operas Maometto Secondo and Mosè in Egitto by Gioachino Rossini
752#	S43	Gelb rollt	pf		1881	Piano, arr.	renumbered as S. 554/1
753	S42	Alfonso und Estrella	pf		1850–51	Piano, arr.	arr. of Act I of the opera Alfonso und Estrella, D. 732 by Franz Schubert; lost
754#	—	Seconda mazurka variata	pf		1880	Piano, arr.	renumbered as S. 573a
755–755b		===== For piano, four hands =====					
755	S10	Sonata	pf4h		1825	Piano, 4 hands	lost
755a	W10	A magyarok Istene (Ungarns Gott)	pf4h		1881	Piano, 4 hands	arr. of S. 339; Liszt's authorship doubtful
755b	S30	Grosse Fantasie über God Save the Queen und Rule Britannia (Fantasie uber englische Themen)	pf4h		1841	Piano, 4 hands	arr. of S. 694; lost
756–757		===== For two pianos =====					
756	W5	Mosonyis Grabgeleit	2pf		1870	Piano, 2 pianos	arr. of S. 194; Liszt's authorship uncertain
757	S57	Le triomphe funèbre du Tasse	2pf		1866–69	Piano, 2 pianos	arr. of S. 112/3; lost
758–761		===== For organ =====					
758	S40	Die Orgel	org		1850–59?	Organ	symphonic poem after Johann Gottfried Herder; lost
759#	E22/2	Adagio	org	D♭ major	1866–67?	Organ	renumbered as S. 672d/2
759a	—	Fantasie und Fuge über den Choral Ad nos, ad salutarem undam	org		1874-75	Organ	based on a theme from the opera Le prophète by Giacomo Meyerbeer; 2nd version of S. 259; doubtful
760	S59	Cantico del sol di Francesco d'Assisi	org		1881	Organ, arr.	arr. of S. 4/2; lost
761	S51	Marche funèbre	vc pf org		1860–69?	Organ, arr.	arr. of the 3rd movement from the Piano Sonata No.2, Op. 35 by Frédéric Chopin
762–766		===== Songs with piano =====					
762	S46	Air de Chateaubriand	v (pf?)		1858	Vocal, song	lost; possibly the same as S. 18/4
763	S47	Strophes de Herlossohn	v pf		1858	Vocal, song	lost
764	S48	Kränze pour chant	v pf		1858	Vocal, song	lost
765	S45	Die Glöckchen	v pf		1857	Vocal, song	intended as S. 316/3; lost
765a	S32	L'aube naît	v pf		1842	Vocal, song	lost
766	W4	Der Papsthymnus	v pf		1865?	Vocal, song	Liszt's authorship doubtful
767		===== Other vocal works =====					
767	W8	Excelsior! (Preludio zu dem Glocken des Strassburger Münsters)	v org		1874	Vocal	arr. of prelude from S. 6; Liszt's authorship doubtful
768		===== Recitations with pianoforte =====					
768	S60	Der ewige Jude	nar pf orch		1881	Vocal, recitation	melodrama to words by Christian Friedrich Daniel Schubart; lost
