= György Cziffra discography =

The following is a list of the recordings of the pianist György Cziffra.

In addition to those, there are many non-commercial recordings freely circulating online There are also several releases by the small label Zenith Classical, featuring items from private collections, never-before-available in any format.

== Studio recordings (audio) ==
=== Johann Sebastian Bach ===
- Bach/Busoni: Chorale Prelude, BWV 645 (EMI)
- Bach/Busoni: Das Orgel-Büchlein – In dir ist Freude, BWV 615 & Erschienen ist der herrliche Tag, BWV 629 (EMI)
- Bach/Busoni: Prelude and Fugue, BWV 532 (1968 & 1981 EMI)
- Toccata and Fugue, BWV 565 (EMI)

=== CPE Bach ===
- Sonata, H.245 (ICA, EMI)

=== Mily Balakirev ===
- Islamey, Op.18 (1956 & 1970 EMI, Hungaroton)

=== Ludwig van Beethoven ===
- Für Elise, WoO 59 (EMI)
- Piano Sonata, Op.13 (EMI)
- Piano Sonata, Op.14 No.2 (EMI)
- Piano Sonata, Op.26 (EMI)
- Piano Sonata, Op.27 No.1 (EMI)
- Piano Sonata, Op.53 (EMI)
- Piano Sonata, Op.54 (EMI)
- Piano Sonata, Op.57 (EMI)
- Polonaise, Op.89 (EMI)
- Rondo a capriccio, Op.129 (EMI)
- Variations on 'God Save the King', WoO 78 (EMI)
- Variations on the Russian Dance from the Ballet 'Das Waldmädchen', WoO 71 (EMI)
- Variations, WoO 80 (EMI)

=== Georges Bizet ===
- Bizet/Rachmaninoff: L'Arlésienne – Acte II – Deuxième Tableau – Intermezzo (Minuetto) (EMI)

=== Johannes Brahms ===
- Brahms/Cziffra: Hungarian Dances (Nos. 1–17, 19, 21), WoO 1 (EMI)
- Variations on a Theme by Paganini – Heft I & Heft II, Op.35 (EMI)
- Waltz, Op.39 No.15 (EMI)

=== Frédéric Chopin ===
- Andante spianato et Grande polonaise brillante, Op.22 (Philips) with Manuel Rosenthal
- Ballade, Op.52 (EMI, Philips)
- Barcarolle, Op.60 (EMI)
- Berceuse, Op.57 (Philips)
- Bolero, Op.19 (EMI)
- Etudes, Op.10 (Philips)
- Etude No.3, Op.10 (1958 & 1974 & 1981 EMI)
- Etudes (Nos. 4, 5, 12), Op.10 (EMI)
- Etude No.10, Op.10 (1974 & 1981 EMI)
- Etudes, Op.25 (Philips)
- Etude No.1, Op.25 (1974 & 1974 EMI)
- Etude No.2, Op.25 (EMI)
- Fantaisie-Impromptu, Op.66 (1974 & 1974–1975 EMI)
- Fantaisie, Op.49 (EMI)
- Impromptu, Op.29 (1968 & 1974 & 1974–1975 EMI)
- Impromptu, Op.36 (1974 & 1974–1975 EMI)
- Impromptu, Op.51 (Philips, EMI)
- Krakowiak, Op.14 (EMI) with Georges Cziffra Jr.
- Nocturne, Op.9 (EMI)
- Nocturne, Op.9 No.2 (EMI)
- Nocturne, Op.27 No.2 (Philips)
- Piano Concerto, Op.11 (Philips, 1968 & 1976 EMI) with Georges Cziffra Jr., Manuel Rosenthal
- Piano Sonata, Op.35 (Philips, EMI)
- Piano Sonata, Op.58 (EMI)
- Polonaise-fantaisie, Op.61 (EMI)
- Polonaise, Op.26 (Philips)
- Polonaise, Op.40 (Philips, EMI)
- Polonaise, Op.40 No.1 (EMI)
- Polonaise, Op.44 (Philips, EMI)
- Polonaise, Op.53 (Philips, EMI)
- Prelude, Op.28 No.16 (EMI)
- Scherzo, Op.31 (Philips, EMI)
- Variations brillantes, Op.12 (EMI)
- Waltz, B.21 (EMI)
- Waltz, B.44 (EMI)
- Waltz, B.46 (EMI)
- Waltz, B.56 (Philips, EMI)
- Waltz, B.133 (EMI)
- Waltz, B.150 (EMI)
- Waltz, Op.18 (Philips, EMI)
- Waltz, Op.34 (Philips, EMI)
- Waltz, Op.42 (Philips, EMI)
- Waltz, Op.64 (Philips, EMI)
- Waltz, Op.64 No.1 (EMI)
- Waltz, Op.64 No.2 (EMI)
- Waltz, Op.69 (Philips, EMI)
- Waltz, Op.70 (Philips, EMI)

=== François Couperin ===
- Pièces de clavecin – Book 1 : Ordre II No.23 & Ordre V No.8 (EMI)
- Pièces de clavecin – Book 2 : Ordre VI – No.1(1969 & 1981 EMI, ICA)
- Pièces de clavecin – Book 2 : Ordre VI – No.5 (EMI)
- Pièces de clavecin – Book 3 : Ordre XIII No.10-11 (EMI)
- Pièces de clavecin – Book 3 : Ordre XVIII No.6 (1956 & 1981 EMI)
- Pièces de clavecin – Book 4 : Ordre XVII No.2 & Ordre XXII No.5 (EMI)

=== György Cziffra ===
- Fantaisie roumaine (EMI, Hungaroton)
- Improvisation sur des themes de Gulliaume tell (EMI)
- Reminiscences de Johann Strauss (1956 & 1956 EMI)

=== Louis-Claude Daquin ===
- Pièces de Clavecin – Second Livre : L'Hirondelle (EMI)
- Pièces de Clavecin – Troisième Livre : Le Coucou (1956 & 1981 EMI)

=== Claude Debussy ===
- Clair De Lune (EMI)
- La plus que lente (EMI)
- Pour le piano (EMI)
- Preludes, Vol.1 No.8 (EMI)

=== Ernő Dohnányi ===
- Konzertetüde, Op.28 No.6 (EMI)

=== Manuel de Falla ===
- Falla/Cziffra: El amor brujo(revised) – No.8 Danse Rituelle du Feu (EMI)

=== John Field ===
- Piano Sonata, Op.1 No.1 – 2nd movement (Hungaroton)

=== César Franck ===
- Prélude, Choral et Fugue (EMI)
- Variations symphoniques (1961 & 1969 EMI) with André Vandernoot, Georges Cziffra Jr.

=== George Gershwin ===
- Rhapsody in Blue (Hungaroton) with Zoltán Rozsnyai

=== Charles Gounod ===
- Gounod/Liszt: Faust – Act 2 : Waltz (EMI)

=== Edvard Grieg ===
- Lyric Piece, Op.43 No.1 (EMI)
- Piano Concerto, Op.16 (1958 & 1969 EMI, Hungaroton) with Georges Cziffra Jr., André Vandernoot, Zoltán Rozsnyai

=== Johann Nepomuk Hummel ===
- Rondo, Op.11 (1956–1957 & 1969 EMI, Hungaroton)

=== Aram Khachaturian ===
- Gayane – Danse du sabre (1956 & 1956 & 1956 EMI, Hungaroton)

=== Johann Ludwig Krebs ===
- Bourrée

=== Franz Liszt ===
- Tarantelle di bravura d’après la tarantelle de La muette de Portici, S.386 No.1 (EMI, Hungaroton)
- Polish Songs (Nos. 1, 5), S.480 (EMI)
- Le rossignol, S.250 No.1 (EMI)
- Liszt/Cziffra: Hungarian Rhapsody No. 16 S.244(EMI)
- Liszt/Cziffra: Hungarian Rhapsody No. 19 S.244 (EMI, Hungaroton)
- Ballade, S.171 (EMI)
- Concert Etudes, S.144 No.2 & No.3 (Philips)
- Concert Etudes, S.145 (EMI, Hungaroton)
- Fantasie über ungarische Volksmelodien, S.123 (1957 & 1964 & 1968 EMI) with André Vandernoot, Georges Cziffra Jr., Pierre Dervaux
- Gaudeaums Igitur, S.509 (EMI)
- Grand galop chromatique (EMI)
- Grandes études de Paganini, S.141 No.3 La Campanella (1959 & 1975 EMI)
- Grandes études de Paganini, S.141 No.5 La Chasse (EMI)
- Harmonies poétiques et religieuses III, S.173 – No.7 (EMI)
- Hungarian Rhapsodies (Nos. 2, 6, 12, 15), S.244 (Hungaroton)
- Hungarian Rhapsodies (Nos. 1, 3–5, 7–11, 13–14), S.244 (EMI)
- Hungarian Rhapsodies (Nos. 1–15), S.244 (EMI)
- Hungarian Rhapsody, S.244 – No.2 (ICA)
- Legend, S.175 No.1 (EMI)
- Legend, S.175 No.2 (EMI, Philips)
- Liebesträume, S.541 – No.3 (1957 & 1977 EMI)
- Mephisto Waltz, S.541 (1957 & 1985–1986 EMI)
- Piano Concerto, S.124 (1957 & 1961 & 1969 EMI, Hungaroton) with André Vandernoot, Georges Cziffra Jr., Gyorgy Lehel, Pierre Dervaux
- Piano Concerto, S.125 (1958 & 1969 EMI) with André Vandernoot, Georges Cziffra Jr.
- Piano Sonata, S.178
- Polonaise, S.223 – No.1 (EMI)
- Polonaise, S.223 – No.2 (Philips, EMI)
- Rhapsodie espagnole, S.254 (EMI)
- Soirées de Vienne, S.427 – No.6 (EMI, Hungaroton)
- Totentanz, S.126 (1964 & 1968 EMI) with André Vandernoot, Georges Cziffra Jr.
- Transcendental Etudes (Nos. 1–11), S.139 (Hungaroton)
- Transcendental Etudes, S.139 (EMI)
- Transcendental Etude, S.139 – No.9 (EMI)
- Transcendental Etude, S.139 – No.10 (1956 & 1981 EMI)
- Trascendental Etude, S.139 – No.12 (EMI)
- Valse-Impromptu, S.213 (1956 & 1957 & 1977–1978 & 1985–1986 EMI, Hungaroton)
- Valses oubliées, S.215 – No.1 (1957 & 1977–1978 EMI, Hungaroton)
- Années de pèlerinage I, S.160 (EMI)
- Années de pèlerinage II, S.161 (EMI)
- Années de pèlerinage II, S.161 – No.6 (Philips)
- Années de pèlerinage II, Supplément, S.162 (EMI)
- Années de pèlerinage II, Supplément, S.162 – No.3 Tarantella (Philips)
- Années de pèlerinage III, S.163 (EMI)
- Années de pèlerinage III, S.163 – 4 (EMI)
- Konzertparaphrase über Mendelssohns Hochzeitsmarsch und Elfenreigen aus der Musik zu Shakespeares Sommernachtstraum, S.410 (EMI, Hungaroton)
- Ouvertüre zu Tannhäuser, S.442 (EMI, Hungaroton)
- Paraphrase de concert sur Rigoletto, S.434 (EMI, Hungaroton)
- Präludium und Fuge über den Namen BACH, S.529 No.2 (Philips)

=== Jean-Baptiste Lully ===
- Gavotte (1956 & 1969 & 1981 EMI)

=== Felix Mendelssohn ===
- Mendelssohn/Rachmaninoff: A Midsummer Night's Dream, Op.61 – No.1 (EMI)
- Lieder ohne Worte, Op.62 – No.6 (EMI)
- Lieder ohne Worte, Op.67 – No.4 (EMI)
- Piano Concerto, Op.25 (EMI) with Georges Cziffra Jr.
- Rondo Capriccioso, Op.14 (1968 & 1968 EMI)
- Fantaisie, Op.16 – No.2 Scherzo (EMI)

=== Wolfgang Amadeus Mozart ===
- Piano Sonata, K.310 (EMI)
- Piano Sonata, K.311 – 3rd movement (EMI)

=== Sergei Rachmaninoff ===
- Piano Concerto, Op.18 (EMI) with Georges Cziffra Jr.
- Prelude, Op.23 – No.5 (EMI)

=== Jean-Philippe Rameau ===
- Dardanus – Rigaudon (1969 & 1981 EMI)
- Nouvelles suites de pièces de clavecin – No.12 & No.16 (EMI)
- Pièces de clavecin – Suite II No.4 (EMI)
- Pièces de clavecin – Suite II No.7 (1959 & 1981 EMI)

=== Maurice Ravel ===
- Jeux d'eau (EMI)
- Le tombeau de Couperin – No.6 (EMI)
- Sonatine (EMI)

=== Nikolai Rimsky-Korsakov ===
- Rimsky-Korsakov/Cziffra: The Tale of Tsar Saltan – Act III Flight of the Bumblebee (1956 & 1956 EMI, Hungaroton)

=== Gioachino Rossini ===
- Rossini/Cziffra: La Danza (EMI)

=== Camille Saint-Saëns ===
- Étude, Op.52 – No.6 (EMI)

=== Domenico Scarlatti ===
- Keyboard Sonata, K.96 (EMI)
- Keyboard Sonata, K.101 (EMI)
- Keyboard Sonata, K.159 (1956 & 1969 EMI)

=== Franz Schubert ===
- Schubert/Tausig: Marché militaires, D.733 – No.1
- Impromptu, D.899 – No.4 (1969 & 1981 EMI)
- Impromptu, D.935 – No.1 (EMI)

=== Robert Schumann ===
- Carnaval, Op.9 (1957 & 1968 EMI)
- Fantasiestücke, Op.12 (EMI)
- Fantasiestücke, Op.12 – No.1 (EMI)
- Fantasiestücke, Op.12 – No.7 (Hungaroton)
- Faschingsschwank aus Wien, Op.26 (EMI)
- Kinderszenen, Op.15 – No.7 (EMI)
- Novellette, Op.21 – No.8 (EMI)
- Symphonic Etudes, Op.13 (EMI)
- Toccata, Op.7 (EMI)

=== Johann Strauss II ===
- Strauss/Cziffra: An der schönen blauen Donau (Hungaroton)
- Strauss/Cziffra: Der Zigeunerbaron (Hungaroton)
- Strauss/Cziffra: Die Fledermaus (Hungaroton)
- Strauss/Cziffra: Le beau Danube bleu (EMI)
- Strauss/Cziffra: Tritsch-Tratsch Polka (Hungaroton, EMI)

=== Pyotr Ilyich Tchaikovsky ===
- Tchaikovsky/Liszt: Eugene Onegin, Op.24 – Act III No.19 (EMI)
- Piano Concerto, Op.23 (1956 & 1957 EMI)

=== Giuseppe Verdi ===
- Verdi/Cziffra: Il trovatore (Hungaroton)

=== Franz von Vecsey ===
- Vecsey/Cziffra: Valse triste (EMI, Hungaroton)

=== Carl Maria von Weber ===
- Konzertstück, Op.79 (EMI) with Georges Cziffra Jr.

== Live recordings (audio) ==
=== Liszt ===
- Concert Etudes, S.145 No.2 (Aura Music, Archipel)
- Fantasie über ungarische Volksmelodien, S.123 (ICA) with André Cluytens
- Grand galop chromatique (Ermitage, Hungaroton, Medici Masters)
- Harmonies poétiques et religieuses III, S.173 – No.7 (ICA, Aura Music)
- Hungarian Rhapsody, S.244 – No.2 (Aura Music)
- Hungarian Rhapsody, S.244 – No.6 (Medici Masters, Ermitage)
- Liebesträume, S.541 – No.3 (Aura Music, Ermitage)
- Piano Concerto, S.124 (ICA, Archipel) with André Cluytens, Fulvio Vernizzi
- Piano Concerto, S.125 (Archipel) with Bernard Conz
- Polonaise, S.223 – No.2 (Medici Masters, Ermitage)
- Präludium und Fuge über den Namen BACH, S.529 No.2 (ICA)
- Rhapsodie espagnole, S.254 (ICA, Medici Masters, Ermitage)
- Totentanz, S.126 (IDIS) with Umberto Cattini
- Transcendental Etude, S.139 – No.5 (Archipel)
- Transcendental Etude, S.139 – No.10 (Aura Music, Archipel)
- Valse-Impromptu, S.213 (Ermitage)
- Années de pèlerinage II, S.161 – No.7 (Archipel)
- Années de pèlerinage III, S.163 – 4 (Archipel)

=== Bach ===
- Bach/Busoni: Prelude and Fugue, BWV 532 (Ermitage)

=== Bartók ===
- Piano Concerto, Sz.95 (EMI) with Mario Rossi

=== Beethoven ===
- Piano Sonata, Op.53 (Ermitage)

=== Chopin ===
- Ballade, Op.52 (Medici Masters, Aura Music)
- Etudes (Nos. 3, 10, 12), Op.10 (Aura Music)
- Etude No.1, Op.25 (Aura Music)
- Fantaisie-Impromptu, Op.66 (Aura Music)
- Fantaisie, Op.49 (Medici Masters, Ermitage)
- Impromptu, Op.51 (Medici Masters)
- Piano Concerto, Op.11 (claves) with Georges Cziffra Jr.
- Piano Sonata, Op.35 (Ermitage)
- Polonaise, Op.26 No.2 (Ermitage)
- Polonaise, Op.53 (Medici Masters, Ermitage)
- Scherzo, Op.31 (Medici Masters, Ermitage)
- Waltz, Op.18 (Medici Masters)
- Waltz, Op.34 No.3 (Medici Masters)
- Waltz, Op.42 (Aura Music)
- Waltz, Op.64 No.1 (Aura Music)
- Waltz, Op.64 No.2 (Aura Music)

=== Grieg ===
- Piano Concerto, Op.16 (ICA) with Georges Tzipine

=== Lully ===
- Gavotte (ICA)

=== Scarlatti ===
- Keyboard Sonata, K.96 & K.159 & K.284 & K.446 & K.533 (ICA)

=== Schumann ===
- Carnaval, Op.9 (Ermitage)
