= Gypsy style =

Music genre

The term Romani style refers to the way Eastern European music is played in coffeehouses and restaurants, at parties, and sometimes on-stage in European cities. Music played in this style differs from actual Romani music played by Romani and Sinti people, many of whom regard the term "gypsy" as a slur when applied to their community.

It consists mainly of instrumentals and usually performed by strings, except in the Romanian variant where the pan flute is the main instrument. The accompaniment may be executed by various instruments, but by preference includes a cimbalom and a double bass.

== Characteristics ==
Music played in this style can easily be recognized among many other styles. Characteristic elements of the style include:

- Instrumentation
- The repertoire
- The idiom

Among these items the last one — the idiom — is decisive: it is mainly the way of playing that determines whether a tune is played in Roma people's style or not. It is — just like in jazz – not the combination of instruments that determines the style, but its characteristic performance.

== Instrumentation ==
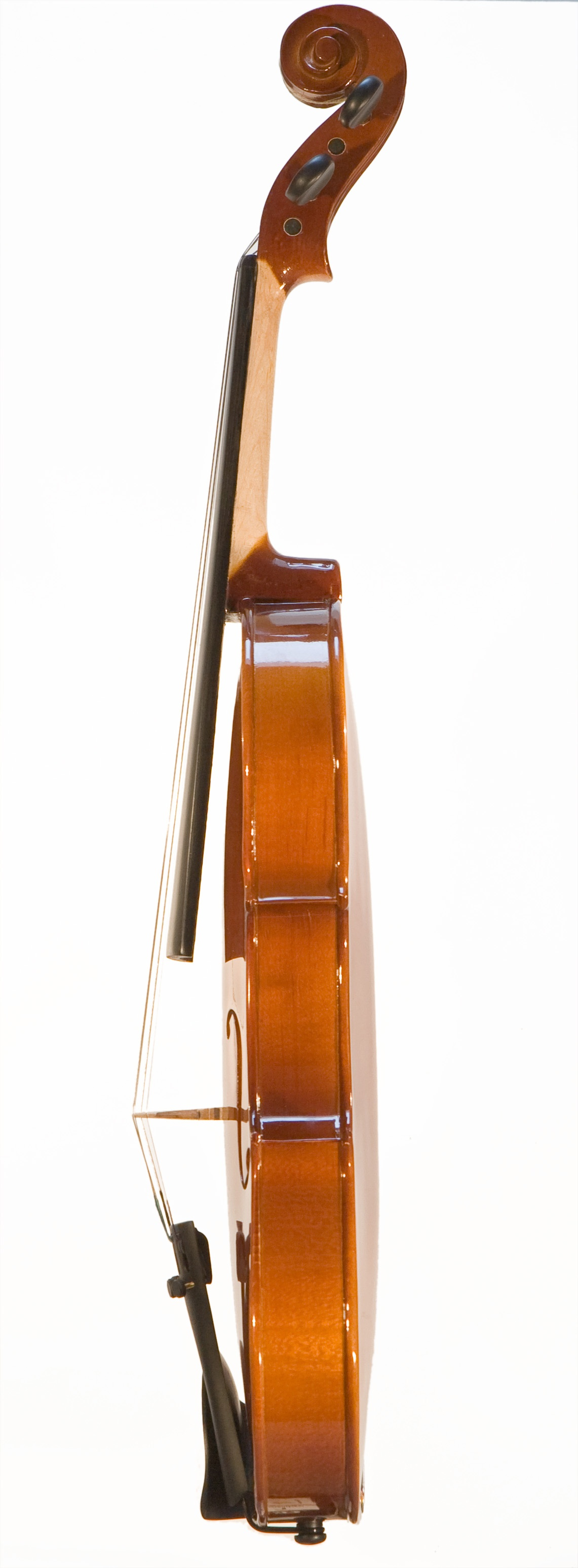

With its accompaniment the tunes are elevated above the level of simple folk music. Part of the beauty of the music is founded on the harmonies that the cimbalom and the bass add to the score.

A good example is the well-known song Csak egy szép lány, also known as the slow movement in Pablo de Sarasate's Zigeunerweisen. In the sixth bar, a modulation from C minor to E flat occurs.

Violin and Cimbalom – The primas playing in the same style at the same time, orchestral leader and soloist. He suggests variations in the tempo with subtle movements of his bow and his body. He is supported by the cimbalom player who beats the rhythm with his small hammers and shapes the harmonies. Franz Liszt has said of their cooperation:

Together they exercise the right to shape the music. The violin develops the melody, shapes the phrases, and introduces tiny pauses. The cimbalom sets the rhythm, indicates accelerations and de-accelerations, and affects the volume.

Violin– There doesn’t exist an instrument called “Gypsy violin”. Players in the style have a preference for violins with a dark tone quality from which they can draw a special sound. The listener gets the impression that he hears the aforementioned violin but that is not so.

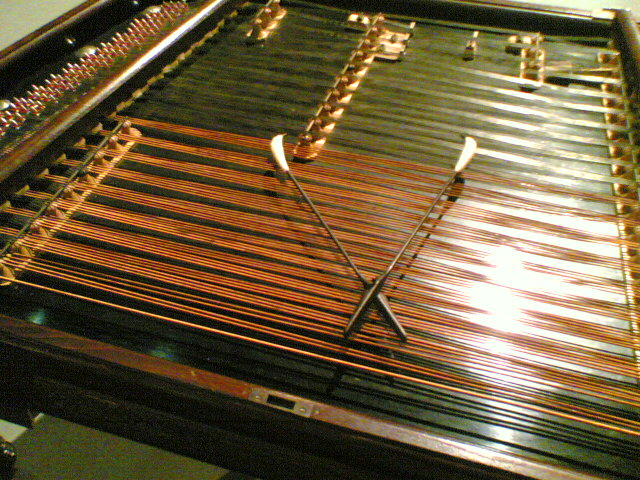
The cimbalom takes care of the harmony

The Cimbalom – A characteristic instrument for producing the style is the cimbalom. It has a playing surface strung with steel strings which are hammered with two beaters. The chords are played in arpeggio: one note after the other in rapid succession. This provides the tinkling sound that adds much to the character of the style.

Bass – The double bass supports the tunes this with its deep booming sound. He lifts, as if it were, the music above itself and gives it a profound base. Without double bass, the strength and the soul of the music would be missing.

Kontras – the melodies win much power by introducing a second violin to the ensemble, the "kontras" which plays second voices and two-stringed harmonies and adds in this way much to the musical effect of the style.

Viola– The viola (called here by its German name Bratsche) plays a typical role in the music of this style. In slow movements, it takes the two-stringed harmonies from the second violin which then can continue playing second voices. In fast movements the bratsch enhances the rhythm by playing the after-beat – see Beat (music) – often in a forceful manner, creating the typical style rhythm called “estam”.

Piano – In larger orchestras of this style, especially in Western Europe, a piano is added which does little more than enhance rhythm and harmony. It is a question of taste: Hungarian and Romanian-based orchestras don’t like a piano in their ranks. But a typical Romani band like Tata Mirando leans on its piano, assisted by a (large model) guitar, and creates in this way a highly characteristic sound.

Clarinet – Orchestras playing Hungarian melodies sometimes include a clarinet. It has a unique role by adorning the melody with ornaments and by “playing around” the melody. It can be compared with the role of the clarinet in a Dixieland ensemble. Sometimes the clarinet takes the lead and plays a variant of the main melody.

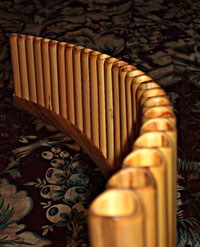
The player blows across the open ends of the pipes

The Panflute – In Romanian orchestras the panflute – or naï in Romanian – takes the place of the violin in other combinations. The panflute plays the fierce dance tunes of the Romanian folk music in a way similar to the violin in Hungarian fast movements: with many ornamentations and rhythmic variations, but in a style that is instantly recognizable as Romanian. In slow movements, it introduces the style by varying the pitch, sliding to a tone, and using different shades of sound.

Accordion – Romanian and Russian-related orchestras often include an accordion. It reinforces the rhythm and strengthens the after-beat. It shall however sparingly be deployed as otherwise, the accordion might drown the other voices. In doinas and ballads or czardasses it sometimes takes care of the solos.

Larger Formations – With the formations described above, a limit in size has been reached. With more than about seven to eight players, it becomes difficult to play by heart. Written scores then make their appearance, and the style is lost.

== Repertoire ==
The music played in this style is usually of Hungarian, Romanian, or Russian origin. But also, melodies from Czech, Bulgarian, or other East European origins may be used.

The Hungarian melodies are always played in a strict succession: first the slow movements, ballads or lassans, then the medium tempo palotas, and thereafter the fast czardas or the even faster friss czardas. A special role is played by the nóta, written music in a folk style, but played by heart in this style.

The Romanian melodies have altogether other characters, melodically simple but with more complicated rhythms. The fast hora is played in a straightforward 2:2 or 2:4 rhythm, the sirba in a complicated rhythm. The slow doina resembles the blues in jazz and is often improvised with a rubato background of chords.

The Russian melodies are characterized by songs that easily can be remembered. Well-known melodies, such as Black Eyes or Kalinka, stem from the Russian repertoire. Slow movements alternate with czardasses; also Cossack songs are played in this article's style.

A special class is formed by melodies written by Western European musicians in this style, such as the Monti czardas, nicknamed Spaghetti Czardas by its critics.

== Idiom ==
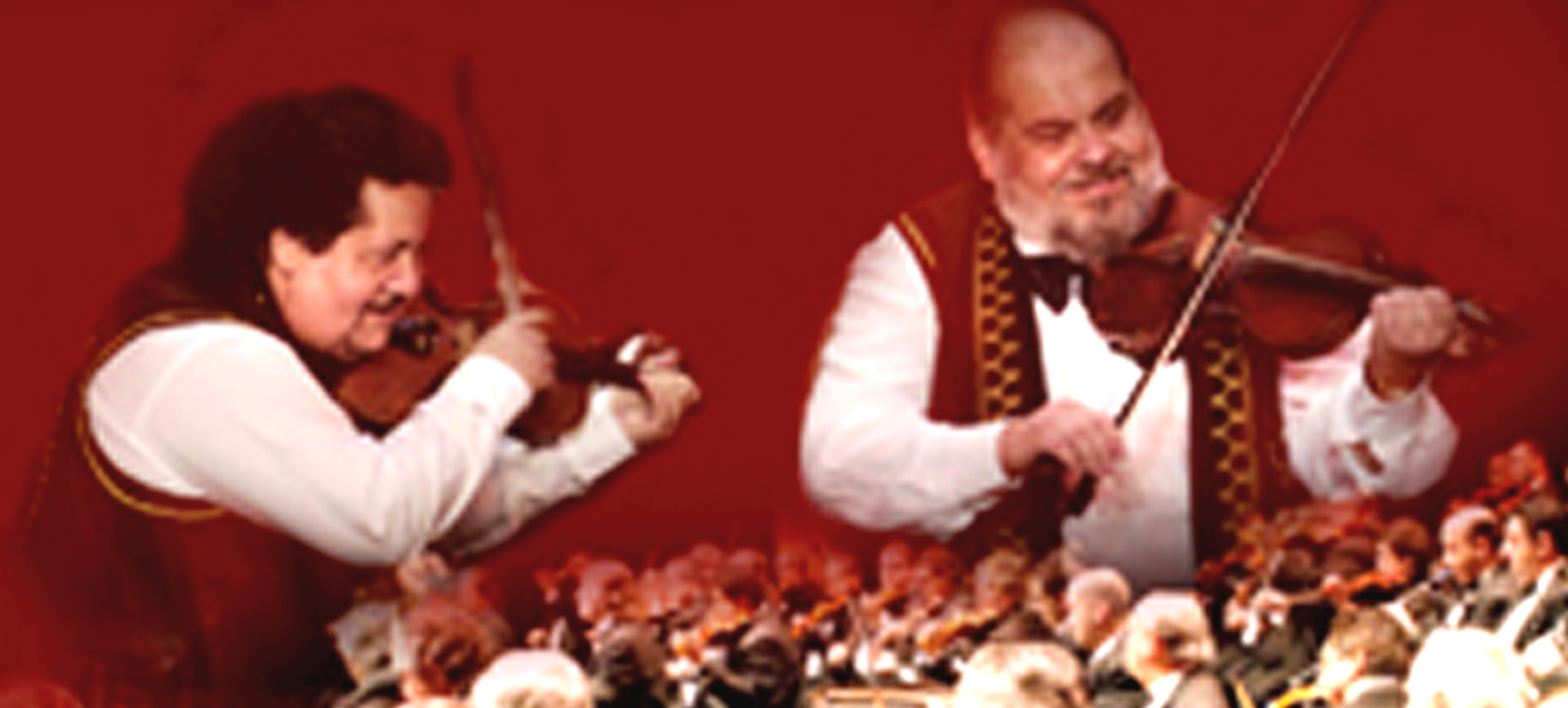
The style is mainly determined by the characteristic way of playing the violin

The most important aspect of the style is its musical idiom, which can well be compared with the concept of idiom in speech: an American and an Englishman speak the same language, but each of them does that with his own accent, uses his own words and expresses himself in his own manner.

In the same way, an orchestral violinist and a violin player of this style use the same instrument, but here as well exist great differences. Each has his own sound, uses his own phrases, and expresses himself in his characteristic way. In short, both of them play in their own idiom.

=== Ornamentation ===
The style differs from the style of the original folk music by its rich and sometimes oriental ornamentation. The music may sometimes be so embellished that the original melody hardly can be recognized. Simple folk songs are transformed into elaborate melodies that often surpass their originals.

The transformation starts already when playing one tone. A long note is not simply played but is either approached by an elaborate ornament, or “slides” towards the tone, or is reached by a number of short notes in a bouncing effect.

An effective way of embellishment is the use of rhythmic variations in the melody: just too early, or just too late. In faster rhythms this produces a bouncing effect that may become most exciting.

=== Accompaniment ===
Like the melody, the accompaniment does not simply follow the harmonic structure of the original but is embellished as well.

Characteristic features are:

- Chords are more often varied than in the original melody
- Harmonic transitions are introduced that did not exist in the original
- A harmonic transition that occurs in the original is emphasized so that it sounds as if it were an added harmony
- At the end of a melody sometimes a transitional chord is added to prepare for the repetition of the melody
- There is a preference for diminished chords, like in some types of jazz music

Another effect is joining in "too late" which enhances the impression of improvisation. The double-bass player sometimes seems to search for the right tone by gliding over the strings towards the right tone.

=== Breathing space ===
A Romani violinist taking ample breathing space; small breaks in the development of a melody. The duration of a pause is critical. Too short of a pause has a reduced dramatic effect, and too long of a pause risks losing the attention of the audience. Taking breathing spaces (Luftpausen in German) is characteristic for a good soloist.

Some Romani violinists go to extremes. Once the primas of the Romani orchestra Tata Mirando took his violin from his shoulder and inspected the shoulder rest whilst his orchestra continued its accompaniment and treated his break as a prolonged Luftpause. It just sounded as if it was meant so from the beginning. After a while the primas could proceed without any embarrassment.

=== Am Tisch ===
A typical element is playing am Tisch — the players assemble around the table of a particular party and give there a kind of private concert. This table music goes back to an old tradition; more than two hundred years ago the first female primas, Panna Czinka, played in this way at the table of her hosts and was extra rewarded for her efforts.

== Panel ==
A panel of three musical experts was once requested to listen to music played in the style. The panel consisted of an internationally known conductor, a teacher of musical theory, and a musician with experience in improvised music. They listened to a variety of Hungarian lassans, palotasses and czardasses; to Romanian cântecs, horas, sârbas and doinas; and to Russian romances and czardasses. Their statements were unambiguous:

- Exotic scales like the so-called "Gypsy scale" are rarely used. All melodies are in the classic minor and major tone scales, the harmonies are uncomplicated and have usually a "classic" sound.
- In a few phrases, only an East Asian influence, or a small part of the scale, was recognized.
- It is the improvised way of playing that makes the music sound in the "style": the rhythmic shifts, the ornaments, the treatment of the tone. "Beautifully played and very characteristic," was the verdict. "Very clever," was said of the small rhythmic shifts in the fast melodies. "It lets the music swing, in a way similar to jazz, although with another character."
- The harmonic structure of the slow movements has a special character: the dissolving of a chord is often postponed so that tension is created. “The soloist postpones the solution,” or “He lingers on the dominant,” were characteristic statements.
- In Romanian music, the rhythmic variations were appreciated, but not found complicated.
- When listening to Russian melodies the remarkable statement was made that the style does not differ – at least in the ears of this panel – from that of Hungarian tunes. The melodies may stem from another repertoire, but the manner of playing is not different. Even the balalaika in some of the Russian melodies made use of the same characteristic and improvising style as the violin in other records.

== Prominent artists ==
These include the Gipsy Kings, Taraf de Haïdouks, and Musafir.

== Sources ==
- "Zigeunermusik" by the Hungarian musicologist Bálint Sarosi, Budapest 1970, which book is available in Hungarian, German, and English.
- "Zigeunermuziek", Delft 1996, F. H. Kreuger ISBN 90-407-1362-6, (Dutch).
- "Gypsy Music", the great musical encyclopedias.

== Links to live performances ==
- For typical Hungarian Gypsy music see , or in a relaxed, almost jam-session-like, atmosphere see
- Romanian Gypsy-style music in a Bucharest restaurant:
- The Monti czardas is of non-Romani origin, but is played here in a Gypsy style: . And listen to the Russian folksong "Les Deux Guitares" by the same virtuoso

In these examples the interaction between cimbalom and violin is clearly visible; as well as the role of the double bass, the second violin and the piano; and sometimes those of the clarinet or accordion.
