= Hungarian Rhapsody No. 5 =

Composition by Franz Liszt

Hungarian Rhapsody No. 5, S.244/5, in E minor, is the fifth in a set of 19 Hungarian Rhapsodies by composer Franz Liszt. It is marked Lento, con duolo. The piece was given the nickname Héroïde-élégiaque by the composer himself. It is very different from his other Hungarian Rhapsodies, as it does not follow the intro - lassan - friska structure and can be viewed as the darkest and most melancholic of the set. It was composed in 1847 and later arranged for orchestra.

== Sources of the melodies ==
The tunes in this rhapsody originate from a Hungarian dance by József Kossovits, entitled Hősi elégia.
