= Hungaria (Liszt) =

Symphonic poem by Franz Liszt

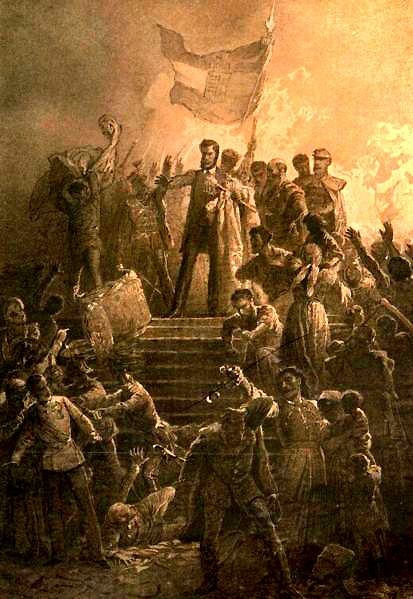
Artist Mihály Zichy's rendition of Sándor Petőfi reciting the Nemzeti dal to a crowd on March 15, 1848

Franz Liszt wrote his symphonic poem Hungaria in 1854, basing it partly on the Heroic March in the Hungarian Style for piano which he wrote in 1840. It was premiered under Liszt's baton at the Hungarian National Theater in Budapest on September 8, 1856, where it achieved an enormous success. "There was better than applause," the composer later wrote. "All wept, both men and women!" He was reminded with that scene of the proverb that "tears are the joy of the Hungarians."

== Structure ==
Hungaria has no programme and is best considered a Hungarian Rhapsody on an extended scale. After a short introduction, marked Largo con duolo, the main theme of the March in the Hungarian Style appears on clarinets, bassoons and violas. This theme and its continuation dominate the first section of this work, though interrupted at one point by a cadenza for solo violin. This section contains the stylistic characteristics of the verbunkos, with Largo con duolo sections alternating with an Andante marziale in a contrast of lassú and friss, sharply accentuated rhythms and profuse violinistic ornamentation.

The music increases in violence, eventually leading to a second theme. One of the most typical sections of this work is a funeral march based on this second theme. Here, Liszt clearly wished to symbolize both the defeat of Lajos Kossuth's revolt in the Hungarian Revolution of 1848 and the hope that one day Hungary would be liberated by its own people. The work ends by referring back to both themes.

== Bibliography ==
- ed. Hamilton, Kenneth, The Cambridge Companion to Liszt (Cambridge and New York: Cambridge University Press, 2005). ISBN 0-521-64462-3 (paperback).
  - Shulstad, Reeves, "Liszt's symphonic poems and symphonies"
- ed. Walker, Alan, Franz Liszt: The man and His Music (New York: Taplinger Publkishing Company, 1970). ISBN 0-8008-2990-5
  - Searle, Humphrey, "The Orchestral Works"
- Walker, Alan, Franz Liszt, Volume 2: The Weimar Years, 1848–1861 (New York: Alfred A Knopf, 1989). ISBN 0-394-52540-X
