= Hungarian Rhapsody No. 2 =

1851 composition by Franz Liszt

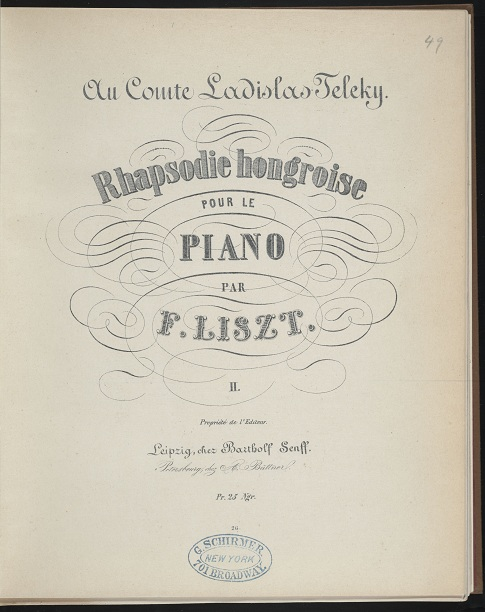
Cover of first edition score of this piece, 1851.

Main theme from the friska

Hungarian Rhapsody No. 2 in C♯ minor, S.244/2, is the second in a set of 19 such rhapsodies for piano solo by Franz Liszt. Composed in 1847, it is perhaps the most famous of the set, which was published four years later. In 1860, together with Franz Doppler, the composer orchestrated the work (shifting its key up to D minor) along with five others from the nineteen, and these orchestrations were published in 1875. In both its original and orchestrated versions, the Hungarian Rhapsody No. 2 has enjoyed much use in animated cartoons and its themes have been the basis of several songs.

== Background ==
The Hungarian-born composer and pianist Franz Liszt was strongly influenced by the music heard in his youth, particularly Hungarian folk music, with its unique gypsy scale, rhythmic spontaneity and direct, seductive expression. These elements would eventually play a significant role in Liszt's compositions. Although this prolific composer's works are highly varied in style, a relatively large part of his output is nationalistic in character, the Hungarian Rhapsodies being an ideal example.

Composed in 1847 and dedicated to Count László Teleki, Hungarian Rhapsody No. 2 was first published as a piano solo in 1851 by Bartholf Senff. Its immediate success and popularity on the concert stage led to an orchestrated version, arranged (together with five other rhapsodies) in 1857–1860 by the composer in collaboration with Franz Doppler, and published by Schuberth in 1874–1875. In addition to the orchestral version, the composer arranged a piano duet version in 1874, published by Schuberth the following year.

Offering a contrast to the serious and dramatic lassan, the following friska has simple alternating tonic and dominant harmonization.

Most unusual in this composition is the composer's invitation for the performer to perform a cadenza, although most pianists choose to decline the invitation. Marc-André Hamelin composed a cadenza that has since become famous for its originality, musicality and playfulness, and Sergei Rachmaninoff also wrote a famous cadenza for his interpretation. Liszt himself wrote several cadenzas for his pupils' performances of the piece, but they were rarely performed. Other pianists have arranged their own versions of the Rhapsody with changes beyond that of simply adding a cadenza, most notably Vladimir Horowitz in 1953.

=== Sources of the melodies ===
The title of this rhapsody is slightly misleading, as the introductory theme is Romanian, rather than Hungarian. This theme was found in one of Liszt's Weimar sketchbooks. In his memoirs, Austrian pianist Heinrich Ehrlich accused Liszt of using his own theme for the piece without adding promised attribution, after Ehrlich played it for Liszt in 1846. The memoirs contain an 1864 letter from Liszt, in which the composer acknowledges Ehrlich's influences while making no claim to the melodies; only that his task "as a rhapsodist is merely limited to turning them into works as close as possible to their true essence."

== Form ==
Hungarian Rhapsody No. 2
MIDI rendition by Bernd Krüger

Hungarian Rhapsody No. 2
Performed by Martha Goldstein on an 1851 Erard piano

Hungarian Rhapsody No. 2
Sergei Rachmaninoff playing the first 4 minutes of Hungarian Rhapsody No. 2, recorded in 1919 by Edison Records

Hungarian Rhapsody No. 2
An orchestrated version performed by the United States Navy Band's Concert Band (9:05)

The piece consists of two distinct sections.

The first is the lassan, with its brief introduction. Although beginning on the C♯ major triad, C♯ minor is soon established as the home key. From this point on, the composer modulates freely, particularly to the tonic major and the relative major. The mood of the lassan is generally dark and melancholic, although it contains some playful and capricious moments.

The second section is the friska. It opens quietly in the key of F♯ minor, but on its dominant chord, C♯ major, recalling a theme from the lassan. The alternating dominant and tonic harmonies quickly increase in volume, the tempo gaining momentum as the Friska's main theme (in F♯ major) is approached. At this point, the Friska begins its journey of ever-increasing energy and pianistic bravura, still underpinned by alternating tonic and dominant harmonies. Modulations are limited almost exclusively to the dominant (C♯ major) and the lowered mediant (A major). Before the final whirlwind of sound, a moment of calm prevails in the key of F♯ minor, recalling another of the lassan's themes, and is followed by the instruction, Cadenza ad lib. Finally, in the key of F♯ major, there is a crescendo of prestissimo octaves, which ascend and then descend to cover almost the entire range of the keyboard and bringing the Rhapsody to a conclusion.

Liszt planned his choice of keys in a remarkably symmetrical fashion. Although the lassan's principal key is C♯ minor (with the appropriate key signature used throughout) the work opens on the tonic major chord, C♯ major. However, by bar 6, the minor tonality is established. This device provides a contrast which intensifies the generally dark and sombre character of the lassan. This procedure is directly reversed in the Friska. Although the principal key of the Friska is F♯ major, Liszt chooses to begin in the tonic minor key, F♯ minor, which is sustained until bar 51. For practical reasons of notation (i.e., the prolongation of the tonic minor key), Liszt chooses the key signature of F♯ minor, until the arrival of the main theme in F♯ major. This time, the use of the more serious minor tonality is used as a contrast to the arrival of the playful and jubilant main theme of the Friska.

== Arrangements ==
The orchestral version of the Rhapsody produced by Liszt and Doppler is scored for an orchestra consisting of a piccolo, two flutes, two oboes, two clarinets in B♭ and A (doubling on the piccolo clarinet and clarinet in D), two bassoons, four horns in F, two trumpets in D, three trombones, timpani, bass drum, cymbals, triangle, glockenspiel, harp, and strings, and is raised by a semitone to D minor / G major. Another orchestral arrangement, one semitone below (C minor / F major), by Karl Müller Berghaus, also exists.

In 1933, Franz Schreker made an orchestral transcription, the performance of which was originally intended to be filmed as part of a series entitled Das Weltkonzert. This arrangement is published by Universal Edition.
