= Cziffra =

Cziffra (Hungarian pronunciation: [ˈt͡sifrɒ]) is a Hungarian surname. Notable people with the surname include:

- Géza von Cziffra (1900–1989), Hungarian and Austrian film director and screenwriter
- György Cziffra (1921–1994), Hungarian virtuoso pianist
- György Cziffra Jr. (1943–1981), Hungarian conductor
- Shirin Aumeeruddy-Cziffra
- Zoltán Cziffra (born 1942), Hungarian triple jumper

== See also ==
- Cifra (disambiguation)
