= Hungarian Rhapsody No. 8 =

Composition by Franz Liszt

Hungarian Rhapsody No. 8, S.244/8, in F-sharp minor, is the eighth Hungarian Rhapsody composed by Franz Liszt for solo piano. It was composed in 1847 and published in 1853. It has been nicknamed "Capriccio". It utilizes a melody of Hungarian folk song Káka tövén költ a ruca in the slow section. The allegro motif was also used by Liszt in his symphonic poem Hungaria (1856).

A typical performance of the work lasts about six to seven minutes.

== Sources of the melodies ==
The first part of this rhapsody is based on a Gypsy song heard by Liszt in the autumn of 1846, Káka tövén költ a ruca. The second part is based on the middle section of Mark Rózsavölgyi's Víg szeszély csárdás.
