= Hungarian Rhapsody No. 6 =

Composition by Franz Liszt

Hungarian Rhapsody in D-flat major, S. 244 no. 6
Performed by Martha Argerich, 1962

Hungarian Rhapsody No. 6 is the sixth work of the 19 Hungarian Rhapsodies composed by Franz Liszt for piano. Liszt composed the piano version in D♭ major. He did not compose orchestral arrangements for any of the Hungarian Rhapsodies.

This work was dedicated to Count Antoine of Appony and uses the form of lassan and friska like many other of his rhapsodies. This piece was later arranged for orchestra.

== Form ==
The piece is divided into three main sections:

- Introduction (Tempo giusto – Presto)
- Lassan (Andante)
- Friska (Allegro)

The first part of the rhapsody is an introduction (Tempo giusto), where the left hand of the player plays a steady bassline made up of the chords in the D♭ major scale. Due to the overlapping of the melody over the bars, the piece does not sound as though it is in a 2/4 rhythm. This is because Liszt did not start the first chord of the piece as an upbeat, which is what many composers have done to relate to the time signature of the piece. The melody of the first part is repetitive, leading to a brief prelude of the friska section's main theme and ending with a long cadenza mainly using the black keys. The second part (presto) is in C♯ major (which is simply an enharmonic version of the previous D♭, not a modulation) and has a lively rhythm, leading to the lassan in B♭ minor. The lassan is played slowly, with a rhythm in improvisational style, again finishing with a large cadenza at the end, leading sequentially to the friska (Allegro) in B♭ major. The melody is played in semiquavers requiring the player to move fast in octaves. The bass line repeats the same strong quaver rhythms. The final part of the piece ends with chromatic scales in octaves moving in contrary motion, leading to B♭ major chords. The piece makes use of the gypsy scale.

== Sources of the melodies ==
The first of the themes in this rhapsody is a song titled Chlopitzky nóta from the collection of the next edition of József Szerdahelyi and Béni Egressy in 1843, which was already included in the 4th and 5th numbers of Magyar Dallok, Volume I. Also featured is the tune Cserebogár, sárga cserebogár and finally a fast verbunkos imported from the 11th number of Magyar Dallok, Volume IV.

== Orchestral arrangement ==
Franz Liszt and Franz Doppler orchestrated this piece, bearing "S. 359/3" as the work number. It is transposed to D major but the "friska" remains in B♭ major, the key in which the piece ends. Although the orchestration is titled "Hungarian Rhapsody No. 3", some editions have changed it to match the original version.

== In popular culture ==
This piece was featured in the Swiss film Vitus.

Part of Hungarian Rhapsody No. 6 was borrowed by Belgian singer and songwriter Jacques Brel in his 1959 song "Ne me quitte pas" (English version "If You Go Away"). The lyrics "Moi, je t'offrirai des perles de pluie venues de pays où il ne pleut pas" ("I'll offer you rain pearls from lands where it does not rain") are sung to a theme borrowed from the second part, lassan (Andante), of this piece.
