= Hungarian Rhapsody No. 11 =

Composition for piano by Franz Liszt

Hungarian Rhapsody No. 11 by Franz Liszt as performed by Jethary Rader in April, 2014.

Hungarian Rhapsody No. 11, S.244/11, in A minor, is the eleventh Hungarian Rhapsody by Franz Liszt. An average performance of the piece lasts about five minutes.

== Sources of the melodies ==
This rhapsody is based on a verbunkos and two csárdás.
