= Hungarian Rhapsody No. 12 =

Composition by Franz Liszt

Hungarian Rhapsody No. 12, S.244/12, in C-sharp minor, is the twelfth Hungarian Rhapsody by Franz Liszt. An average performance of the piece lasts eleven minutes.

== Sources of the melodies ==
Sources for the tunes used in this rhapsody include a csárdás by Márk Rózsavölgyi, a melody from the manuscript collection Nagy potpourri, Beni Egressy's Fantázia, and a portion of A Csikós.
