= Sondra Bianca =

- Born: Sondra Bianca; 17 November 1930 (age 95); Brooklyn, New York, United States of America
- Genre: Classical
- Occupation: Pianist
- Instrument: Piano
- Years active: 1930s – 1950s
- Labels: MGM, Columbia, Lion Records, Parlophone, Remington Records, World's Fair Records, Musiphon Records, Musical Masterpiece Society, Concert Hall Society, Plymouth Records

Sondra Bianca (17 November 1930) is an American born concert pianist and pedagogue who retired early in her career from recording and live performances.

== Career ==
A child prodigy, Bianca first studied with her mother and then with Frank Sheridan at Mannes Music School and Isabella Vergerova at the Curtis Institute of Music. This led to what is documented as an amazing performance as a nine-year-old of a Mozart piano concerto, played from memory, for the New York Philharmonic - which led to her later appearing with this orchestra as a soloist. Her career, therefore, started before the age of ten, at which time she was a soloist with the Schenectady Symphony Orchestra and performed over CBC Radio in their French division.

Later in her career, she performed in Europe with the Hamburg Symphony Orchestra conducted by Hans-Jurgen Walther, the Hamburg Symphony Orchestra conducted by Carl-August Bünte and the New Symphony Society Orchestra conducted by Walter Goehr among others. One of her notable American performances was on January 20, 1955, when she was the guest soloist with the Florida Symphony Orchestra conducted by Frank Miller. The programme included Andre Bloch's "Concerto No. 1", Liszt's "Concerto in E flat", Glinka's Overture to "Russian and Ludmilla", Handel's "Water Music" and Georges Enesco's "Roumanian Rhapsody No. 1". Another notable performance was the piece Rhapsody 21 for the Century 21 Exposition, conducted by Paul Whiteman. One of the specialties in her repertoire was George Gershwin's "Piano Concerto in F". Due to its ban in Nazi Germany it was unpopular in that country for many years. Recent study has shown that she may have been the first to perform the concerto in that country after the end of World War II.

After retiring from live performances, she continued teaching other young pianists. Due to her early exit from performing, she is regarded as something of a mystery by modern enthusiasts of her surviving recordings.

== Pseudonym recordings ==
For reasons unclear, her recordings were released on various budget record labels under a handful of pseudonyms. Some of these names include: Albert Cohen, Karl Bernhard, Frederick Antenelli, David Haines and Suzanne Auber.

== Partial discography ==
- Ravel - Mother Goose Suite - Piano Solo
- Grieg - Piano Concerto in A minor - Pro Musica Hamburg Conducted by Hans Jurgen Walther Parlophone LP PMC1034 (1953)
- Tchaikovsky - Piano Concerto No. 1 in B flat minor - Carl Bamberger Conducting (Columbia Records HS 11012, 1950s)
- Toni Mineo & Paul Whiteman - Rhapsody 21 (World'd Fair Records XTV 82079)
- Chopin waltzes (Concert Hall Records), (Musical Masterpiece Society MMS 2131)
- Richard Addinsell - Warsaw Concerto (Lion Records L 70110, 1954)
- Liszt - Hungarian Fantasy - Jean Martinon conducting the Lamoureux Orchestra of Paris (Plymouth Records P12.37, 1952)
- Liszt - Hungarian Fantasy - Carl Bamberger conducting the Norddeutsche Symphonie Orchester (Musical Masterpiece Society MMS-166, Germany)
- Liszt - Piano Concerto No. 1 - Jean Martinon conducting the Lamoureux Orchestra of Paris (Plymouth Records P12.38, 1952)
- George Gershwin - Piano Concerto in F, Variations on "I Got Rhythm" (Musical Masterpiece Society MMS-161, Germany)
- Sondra Bianca - Piano Favorites (Tops Records L-912-69)
