= Cifra (surname) =

Cifra is a surname. Notable people with the surname include:

- Antonio Cifra (1584–1629), Italian Baroque composer
- Anita Cifra (born 1989), Hungarian handballer
- Ján Cifra (born 1955), Slovak volleyball player
- Matej Cifra (born 1979), Slovak television presenter

== See also ==
- Cifra (disambiguation)
