= Hungarian Rhapsody No. 1 =

1846 composition by Franz Liszt

Hungarian Rhapsody No. 1 in C-sharp minor/E major is the first of a set of 19 Hungarian Rhapsodies by composer Franz Liszt, dedicated to one of his friends and former student, Ede Szerdahelyi. Work on the piece began in 1846 in Klausenburg, and it was published about November 1851. The piece, like many in the set, is composed in the csárdás style, signified by two sections: the lassú (slower, first section) and the friss (faster, second section). Some parts, as the beginning and the trill, resemble the Piano Sonata No. 32 (Beethoven). Also typical for the set, themes in the piece can be traced to earlier sources, specifically Ferenc Erkel and Gáspár Bernát in the first section, and Károly Thern in the second. The gypsy Laci Pócsi and his band are said to have been a source of inspiration for this piece.

== Sources of the melodies ==
In this rhapsody, Liszt used three different tunes by Ferenc Erkel.

== Sources ==
- Leslie Howard: Liner notes for Liszt: Hungarian Rhapsodies. Hyperion, 1999.
