= Hungarian Rhapsody No. 9 =

1847 composition by Franz Liszt

Hungarian Rhapsody No. 9, S.244/9, in E-flat major, is the ninth Hungarian Rhapsody by Franz Liszt. Subtitled "Pesther Carneval" ("Carnival in Pest") by the composer, it was composed in 1847. A typical performance of the piece lasts ten minutes.

Liszt also made versions of the piece for piano four hands and for piano, violin, and cello.

== Sources of the melodies ==
Liszt used five themes in this rhapsody. The first of these, possibly Italian in origin, can be found in one Liszt's manuscript notebooks. The second theme is a csárdás by an unknown composer. After the third theme, which is an unidentified folk tune, Liszt quotes an authentic Hungarian folk song, A kertmegi káposzta. The final theme quoted is a third folk tune, Mikor én még legény voltam.
