= Hungarian Rhapsody No. 14 =

Composition by Franz Liszt

Hungarian Rhapsody No. 14, S.244/14, in F minor, is the fourteenth Hungarian Rhapsody by Franz Liszt. The Hungarian Fantasy, written in 1852, is an arrangement of the rhapsody for piano and orchestra. An average performance of the piece lasts about twelve minutes. It begins with a very subtle intro, with low octaves tremolos, which develop from F-Minor to C-Minor then to E♭-Major. After which Liszt introduces a new theme which he varies for around 100 bars in every way possible. He then subtly writes a new theme, the "Allegro alla Zingarese". He then reuses the 2nd theme to end the 3rd and places a short cadenza between the incredible introduction. After that, he finally brings up the finale of this rhapsody, which lasts around 100 bars before descending into a presto, and a fortissimo with a very subtle, yet still amazing F-Major ending.

== Sources of the melodies ==
This rhapsody is composed of several distinct melodies. Some of them are Hungarian folk songs, such as Magasan repül a daru. Others are of uncertain origin; they may have been written by Liszt himself.
