= Hungarian Rhapsodies =

Piano pieces by Franz Liszt

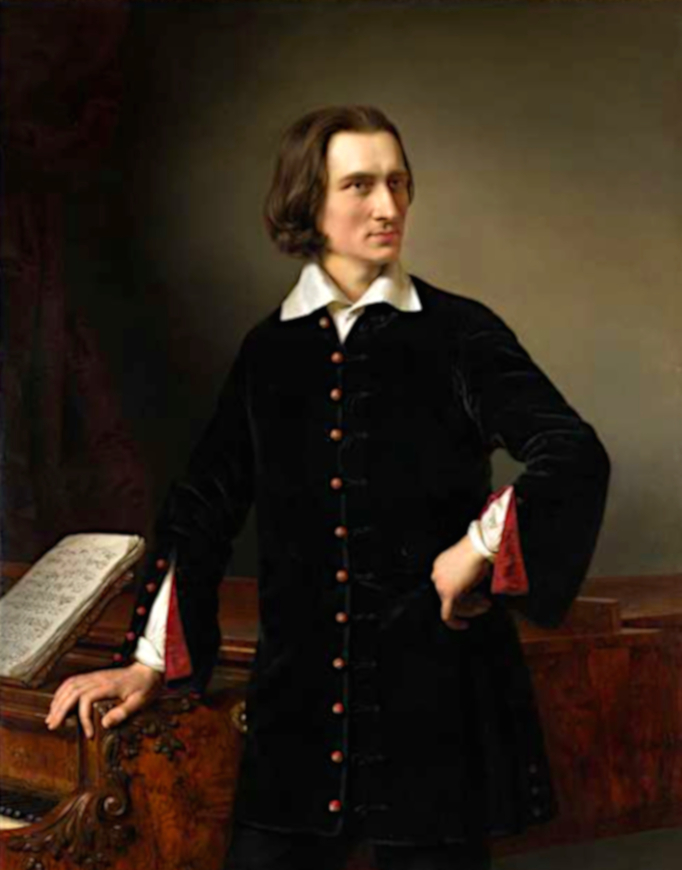
Franz Liszt, portrait by Hungarian painter Miklós Barabás, 1847

The Hungarian Rhapsodies, S.244, R.106 (French: Rhapsodies hongroises, German: Ungarische Rhapsodien, Hungarian: Magyar rapszódiák), are a set of 19 piano pieces based on Hungarian folk themes, composed by Franz Liszt during 1846–1853, and later in 1882 and 1885. Liszt also arranged versions for orchestra, piano duet and chamber ensemble.

Some are better known than others, with Hungarian Rhapsody No. 2 being particularly famous and No. 6, No. 10, No. 12, No. 14 (especially as arranged for piano and orchestra as the Hungarian Fantasy), and No.15 also being well known.

In their original piano form, the Hungarian Rhapsodies are noted for their difficulty (Liszt was a virtuoso pianist as well as a composer).

== Form ==
Liszt incorporated many themes he had heard in his native western Hungary and which he believed to be folk music, though many were in fact tunes written by members of the Hungarian upper middle class, or by composers such as József Kossovits, often played by Roma (Gypsy) bands. The large scale structure of each was influenced by the verbunkos, a Hungarian dance in several parts, each with a different tempo. Within this structure, Liszt preserved the two main structural elements of typical Gypsy improvisation—the lassan ("slow") and the friska ("fast"). At the same time, Liszt incorporated a number of effects unique to the sound of Gypsy bands, especially the pianistic equivalent of the cimbalom. He also makes much use of the Hungarian gypsy scale.

== Arranged versions ==
Nos. 2, 5, 6, 9, 12, and 14 were arranged for orchestra by Franz Doppler, with revisions by Liszt himself. These orchestrations appear as S.359 in the Searle catalogue; however, the numbers given to these versions were different from their original numbers. The orchestral rhapsodies numbered 1–6 correspond to the piano solo versions numbered 14, 2, 6, 12, 5 and 9 respectively.

In 1874, Liszt also arranged the same six rhapsodies for piano duet (S.621). In 1882, he made a piano duet arrangement of No. 16 (S.622), and in 1885, a piano duet version of No. 18 (S.623) and No. 19 (S.623a). Liszt also arranged No. 9 (S.379) for piano, violin and cello and No. 12 (S.379a) for piano and violin.

No. 14 was also the basis of Liszt's Hungarian Fantasia for piano and orchestra, S.123.

== List of the Hungarian Rhapsodies ==
The set is as follows:

Number	Piano solo	Orchestra	Piano Duet	Chamber ensemble	Key	Dedication	Comments
No. 1	S.244/1				C♯ minor	Ede Szerdahelyi	Liszt made an earlier version entitled "Rêves et fantaisies"
No. 2	S.244/2	S.359/2	S.621/2		C♯ minor	Comte László Teleki	
No. 3	S.244/3				B♭ major	Comte Leó Festetics	
No. 4	S.244/4				E♭ major	Comte Casimir Esterházy	
No. 5	S.244/5	S.359/5	S.621/5		E minor	Comtesse Sidonie Reviczky	Subtitled Héroïde-élégiaque
No. 6	S.244/6	S.359/3	S.621/3		D♭ major	Comte Antoine d'Appony	
No. 7	S.244/7				D minor	Baron Fery Orczy	
No. 8	S.244/8				F♯ minor	Anton Augusz	
No. 9	S.244/9	S.359/6	S.621/6	S.379	E♭ major	Heinrich Wilhelm Ernst	Subtitled Pesther Carneval
No. 10	S.244/10				E major	Béni Egressy	Subtitled "Preludio"
No. 11	S.244/11				A minor	Baron Fery Orczy	
No. 12	S.244/12	S.359/4	S.621/4	S.379a	C♯ minor	Joseph Joachim	
No. 13	S.244/13				A minor	Comte Leó Festetics	
No. 14	S.244/14	S.359/1	S.621/1		F minor	Hans von Bülow	arranged for piano and orchestra as Hungarian Fantasia, S.123
No. 15	S.244/15				A minor		Subtitled Rákóczi-Marsch
No. 16	S.244/16		S.622		A minor	Mihály Munkácsy	Subtitled Budapest Munkácsy-Festlichkeiten
No. 17	S.244/17				D minor		
No. 18	S.244/18		S.623		F♯ minor		Subtitled Ungarische Ausstellung in Budapest
No. 19	S.244/19		S.623a		D minor		d'après les 'Csárdás nobles' de K. Ábrányi (sr)

The first two were published in the year 1851, nos. 3–15 in 1853, and the last four were published in 1882 and 1886.

== Bibliography ==
- Walker, Alan (1983). Franz Liszt. Vol. 1, The Virtuoso Years: 1811–1847. New York: Alfred A. Knopf. ISBN 978-0-394-52540-2.
- Sony Classical Records, Horowitz Plays Rachmaninov and Liszt (Sony Music Entertainment (France) Inc., 2003). SMK90447 0904472001
