= Cifra =

Cifra may refer to:

- Cifra (surname), surname
- Cifra 3, a classic clock designed by Gino Valle in 1955
- La cifra, a 1789 opera by Antonio Salieri
- CIFRA - González, Raga y Asociados, a Uruguayan polling consultancy
- Cifra (musical genre) Folkloric music genre from Argentina and Uruguay
- Cifra, a Mexican retail store founded in 1952, now Walmart de México y Centroamérica

== See also ==
- Cziffra
