= String Quartet, Op.103 (Haydn) =

Incomplete string quartets composed by Joseph Haydn ca. 1803

The String Quartet in D minor, Op. 103, Hob. III:83, is an incomplete work by Joseph Haydn, composed in about 1803.

== History ==
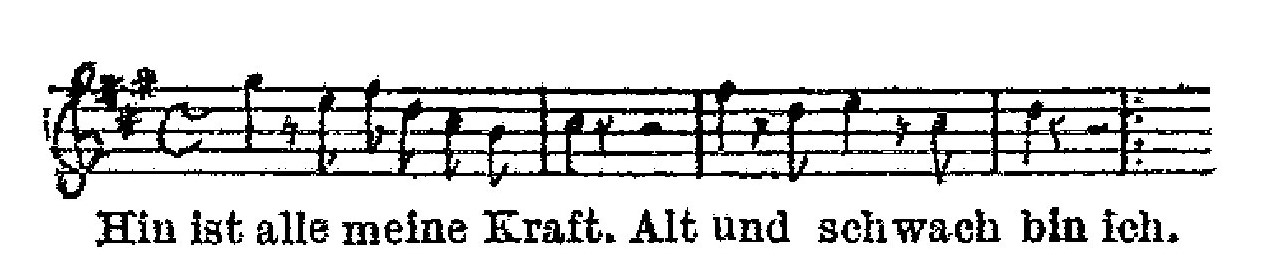
This snippet from a Haydn song (see text) was published with the first edition of the quartet and in effect stands as an explanation for why the quartet consists of only two movements. (The treble clef is a mistake for the soprano clef.)

Haydn had intended this quartet as the third in a series he was composing on a 1799 commission from Prince Lobkowitz. The custom of Haydn's time, and indeed his own practice, was to compose quartets in sets of six. However, work was delayed, and in the end only two completed quartets were presented to the Prince and submitted for publication; these were the two quartets of Opus 77, published in 1799. Haydn retained hopes of writing more, and he did finish the slow movement and minuet that comprise the present quartet. But soon, the decline in his health blocked further progress. For three years, the ailing Haydn attempted to finish the quartet, often working just fifteen minutes at a time. Finally, in August 1805, Haydn threw in the towel and permitted his friend Georg August Griesinger to forward the unfinished quartet to Breitkopf & Härtel in Leipzig for publication.

With his gradual decline, Haydn caused to be printed a set of calling cards, on which appeared the opening notes and words of a four-part song from earlier in his career, called "Der Greis" ("The old [gray-haired] man"); that is: Hin ist alle meine Kraft, Alt und schwach bin ich (Gone is all my strength, Old and weak am I). These cards were given to visitors who appeared at Haydn's home in suburban Vienna. With Haydn's permission, the first edition of Opus 103 appended at the end a copy of this calling card, serving as an apology for the two missing movements.

== Movements ==
1. Andante grazioso
2. Menuetto ma non troppo presto

== Critical opinion ==
Karl Geiringer felt that the quartet-fragment reflected a decline in the aging composer's abilities: "These movements show complete technical mastery, but at the same time a certain lack of inventive power." David Wyn Jones offers a quite different assessment: "The two completed movements show Haydn at his most concentrated and unyielding, a step further on the road he had explored in his last quartet in D minor, Op. 76, No. 2." Richard Wigmore offers a quotation from the mid-century Haydn scholar Rosemary Hughes: "the last incandescence of the flame now held captive in the failing body", and calls the work "testimony to the old composer's undimmed inventiveness in a medium which, almost single-handedly, he took to supreme heights of expressiveness, textual subtlety, and intellectual power."

== Sketches and completion ==
In 2013, Haydn specialist William Drabkin, responding to the discovery of a sketch including Haydn's intended opening bars, composed a new first movement (incorporating Haydn's theme) and a finale, hence an imagined completion of the quartet.

== See also ==
- List of string quartets by Joseph Haydn

== Notes ==
=== Sources ===
- Geiringer, Karl (1982) Haydn: A Creative Life in Music. Berkeley: University of California Press. ISBN 978-0-520-04317-6
- Jones, David Wyn (2009a) Life of Haydn. Cambridge: Cambridge University Press. ISBN 978-0-521-89574-3
- Jones, David Wyn (2009b) "Quartet", in David Wyn Jones (ed.) Oxford Composer Companions: Haydn. Oxford: Oxford University Press. ISBN 978-0-19-955452-2
- Wigmore, Richard (2014) Haydn. London: Faber and Faber.
