= Hungarian Rhapsody No. 15 =

Rhapsody by Franz Liszt

Hungarian Rhapsody No. 15, subtitled Rákóczi March, S.244/15, in A minor, is the fifteenth Hungarian Rhapsody by Franz Liszt. Written in 1853, the rhapsody is based on the Rákóczi March. An average performance of the piece lasts around six minutes.

== Structure ==
The rhapsody is composed of three distinct sections:

- The march (Tempo di Marcia animato) has the melody of the Rákóczi March and is in A minor.
- Un poco meno allegro is a slower section in A Major. A cadenza then leads to the third section.
- The third section is a recapitulation of the march
