= György Cziffra =

Hungarian pianist and composer

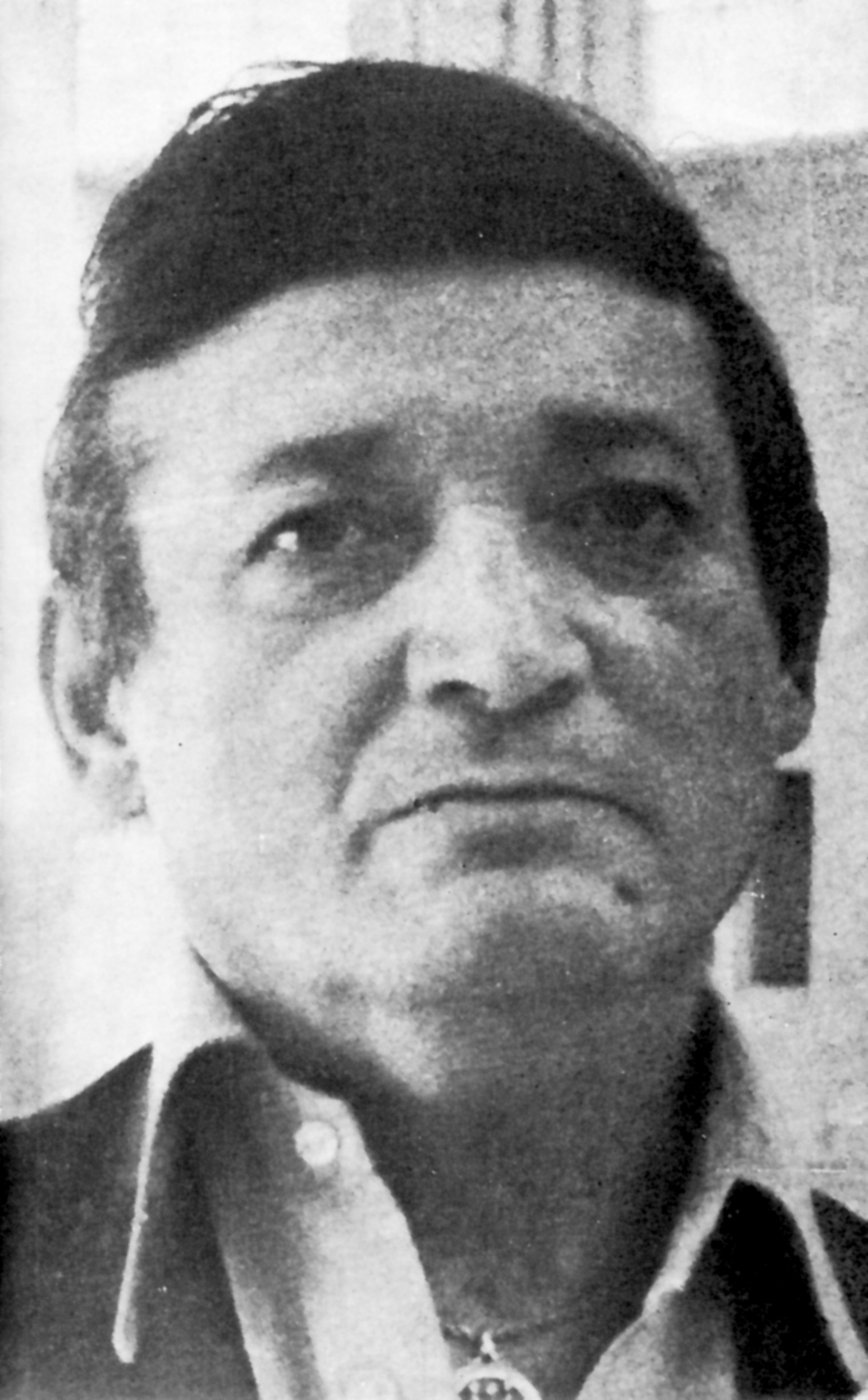

Background information
- Born: Krisztián György Cziffra; 5 November 1921; Budapest, Hungary
- Died: 15 January 1994 (aged 72) Longpont-sur-Orge, Essonne, France
- Genres: Classical, Jazz
- Occupations: Pianist, composer, arranger

Christian Georges Cziffra (Hungarian: Krisztián György Cziffra; (Note: Hungarian pronunciation: [ˈɟørɟ ˈt͡sifrɒ]) 5 November 1921 – 15 January 1994) was a Hungarian-French virtuoso pianist and composer. He is considered to be one of the greatest virtuoso pianists of the twentieth century. Among his teachers was Ernő Dohnányi, a pupil of István Thoman, who was a favourite pupil of Franz Liszt.

Born in Budapest, he became a French national in 1968. Cziffra is known for his recordings of works of Franz Liszt, Frédéric Chopin and Robert Schumann, and also for his technically demanding arrangements or paraphrases of several orchestral works for the piano, including Nikolai Rimsky-Korsakov's Flight of the Bumblebee and Johann Strauss II's The Blue Danube. Cziffra left a sizeable body of recordings.

He lived in Senlis, a commune northeast of Paris, where he ran a foundation for young musicians and artists.

== Early years ==
Cziffra was born to a poor Romani family of musicians in Budapest in 1921. In his memoirs, Cziffra describes his father, a player of the cimbalom, as "a cabaret artist". The family lived in poverty. His father, Gyula was unemployed, and the family income was earned by Cziffra’s mother Ilona and his elder sister, Jolán. His parents had lived in Paris before World War I, when they were expelled as enemy aliens.

His earliest exposure to the piano came from watching his elder sister Jolán practice. She had decided she was going to learn the piano after finding a job which allowed her to save the required amount of money for buying an upright piano. Cziffra, who was weak as a child, often watched his sister practice, and mimicked her. He learned without sheet music, instead repeating and improvising over tunes sung by his parents. Later he earned money as a child improvising on popular music at a local circus.

In 1930 Cziffra began to study at the Steinitz Music School, and in 1932 he passed the entrance examination for the Franz Liszt Academy. Here he studied initially under Imre Keéri-Szántó. He later claimed to have studied with Ernő Dohnányi and István Thomán. However, biographical research by Máté Cselényi casts doubt on whether he did so. During this period, he gave numerous concerts in Hungary, Scandinavia and the Netherlands.

His studies ended in 1941 when he was conscripted into the Hungarian Army.

== Later years ==
Cziffra in 1962

Hungary was allied with the Axis during the Second World War. Cziffra had just married his wife Soleilka, who was pregnant when he entered military training. His unit was sent to the Russian front; however, he was captured by Russian partisans and held as a prisoner of war. After the war, he earned a living playing in Budapest bars and clubs, touring with a European jazz band from 1947 to 1950 and earning recognition as a superb jazz pianist and virtuoso.

After attempting to escape Hungary in 1950, Cziffra was again imprisoned and subject to hard labour in the period 1950–1953. In 1956, he successfully escaped with his wife and son to Vienna, where he was warmly received. His successful Paris debut the following year preceded his London debut at the Royal Festival Hall playing Liszt's first piano concerto and Hungarian Fantasy which was also well received. His career continued with concerts throughout Europe and debuts at the Ravinia Festival (Grieg and Liszt concertos with Carl Schuricht) and Carnegie Hall, New York with Thomas Schippers.

Cziffra frequently performed with a large leather wristband to support the ligaments of his wrist, which were damaged after he was forced to carry 130 pounds of concrete up six flights of stairs during his two years in a labor camp.

In Cannons and Flowers, his autobiography, which has been described as "a hallucinatory journey through privation, acclaim, hostility and personal tragedy", Cziffra recounts his life story up until 1977. In 1966, he founded the Festival de musique de La Chaise-Dieu in the Auvergne, whose pipe organ restoration he sponsored, and three years later he inaugurated a piano competition bearing his own name in Versailles.

In 1968 he took French citizenship and adapted his hitherto-Hungarian forenames to the French language. In 1977 he founded the Cziffra Foundation, situated in the Saint Frambourg chapel in Senlis, Oise. Cziffra bought and restored the building, with the aim of helping young musicians at the outset of their careers.

Cziffra's son, György Cziffra Jr., was a professional conductor and participated in several concerts and recordings with his father. However, his promising career was cut short by his death in an apartment fire in 1981. Cziffra never again performed or recorded with an orchestra, and some critics have commented that the severe emotional blow affected his playing quality.

Cziffra died in Longpont-sur-Orge, Essonne, France, aged 72, from a heart attack resulting from a series of complications from lung cancer. He is buried next to his son.

== List of compositions ==
=== Original works ===
- Improvisation en forme de valse (1950)
- Ouverture Solennelle (Solemn Overture), for piano
- Pastorale pour Gerbert, for piano or organ (1976)

=== Arrangements and transcriptions ===
- Johannes Brahms: 15 Hungarian Dances (transcriptions of Nos. 1-6, 8-10, 12, 13, 16, 17, 19, and 21, from piano duet to piano solo) (c.1950s?)
- Johannes Brahms: Hungarian Dance No. 5 (improv version) (1957?)
- Johannes Brahms: Waltz Op. 39 No. 15 (1993?, much earlier?)
- Frederic Chopin: Minute Waltz (1993?)
- Antonin Dvorak: Improvisation (1988)
- Manuel de Falla: Ritual Fire Dance (c.1955?)
- Edvard Grieg: The Hall of the Mountain King (1988)
- Aram Khachaturian: Sabre Dance (c.1954?)
- Franz Lehar: Gold and Silver Waltz (1993)
- Franz Liszt: Hungarian Rhapsody No. 16 (1950s?)
- Franz Liszt: Hungarian Rhapsody No. 19 (1950s?)
- Jacques Offenbach: Barcarolle (1993)
- Nikolai Rimsky-Korsakov: Flight of the Bumblebee (c.1955?)
- Gioachino Rossini: La Danza (1950s?)
- Gioachino Rossini: Improvisations on Themes from Rossini's William Tell (also referred to as Fantasy on William Tell Overture) (1956)
- Johann Strauss II: An der schönen, blauen Donau (The Blue Danube) (c.1955?)
- Johann Strauss II: Die Fledermaus (1st version) (1950–55)
- Johann Strauss II: Die Fledermaus (2nd, shortened version) (1955)
- Johann Strauss II: Réminiscences de Johann Strauss (from various Strauss compositions) (1956)
- Johann Strauss II: Tritsch-Tratsch Polka (c.1955?)
- Johann Strauss II: Der Zigeunerbaron (The Gypsy Baron) (c.1955?)
- Franz von Vecsey: Valse triste (c.1955?)
- Giuseppe Verdi: Concert Paraphrase on Themes from the Opera Il trovatore by G. Verdi (c.1955?)
- Giuseppe Verdi: Improvisation on a Theme from La Traviata (Libiamo ne' lieti calici) (1993)
- Vincent Youmans: Tea for Two, improvisation (1977)
- Traditional: Román cigányfantázia (Rumanian Gypsy Fantasy) (AKA Fantaisie roumaine, improvisation in gypsy style) (1957) An alternate version was privately recorded by Cziffra in the 1967
- Many improvisations on various classical pieces, performed in live concerts throughout Cziffra's concertizing career, beginning mostly around 1953)
- Numerous improvisations on popular tunes, performed early in Cziffra's career beginning in 1926)
- Numerous jazz improvisations (mostly 1947-50, 1977–78)

== Media ==
=== Audio ===
In addition to the above discography of commercially-released recordings, there exist audio recordings of complete live concerts, a few of which have been commercially released on disc, several can be obtained non-commercially, some however have been lost.

=== Videos ===
- Cziffra playing for BBC broadcasts (1962-1963)
- Cziffra plays Frédéric Chopin's Piano Concerto No. 1
