= Hungarian Rhapsody No. 7 =

Composition by Franz Liszt

Hungarian Rhapsody No. 7, S.244/7, in D minor, is the seventh in a set of nineteen Hungarian Rhapsodies composed by Franz Liszt for solo piano.

== Sources of the melodies ==
The 7th Hungarian Rhapsody is based on three different melodies, all of which are found in the 15th number of Magyar Dalok, Volume VIII. The first is from a collection containing the tune Chlopitzky nótát, while the other two are authentic Hungarian folk songs, entitled Nincsen nékem kedvesebb vendégem and Nem láttam én télen fecskét.
