= Márk Rózsavölgyi =

Hungarian musician

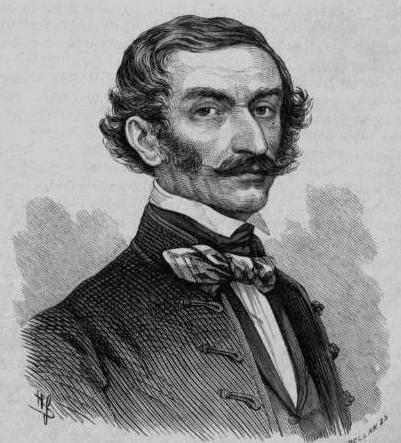

Background information
- Born: Mordecai Rosenthal; August 14, 1787; Balassagyarmat, Kingdom of Hungary
- Died: January 23, 1848 (aged 60) Pest, Kingdom of Hungary
- Occupation: Composer
- Instrument: Violin

Márk Rózsavölgyi (pronounced [ˈmaːrk ˈroːʒɒvølɟi]; born Mordecai Rosenthal; 14 August 1787 – 23 January 1848) was a Hungarian composer and violinist. He has been called "the father of csárdás".

== Life and music ==
Rózsavölgyi was born to a poor tradesman's family in Balassagyarmat, where his bust (made by Jelena Veszely in 1973) can be found in the Palóc-parkland. His family is believed to have had klezmer connections.

From the ages of 11 to 19 he worked as a clerk in Vienna, Pressburg (now Bratislava), and Prague, teaching himself to play the violin. Returning to Pest, he dedicated himself to music, composing in the Hungarian traditional styles, including the verbunkos. His first works were published in Pest in 1811; eventually he published over 200 works. In 1812, he was appointed conductor of the orchestra at the German Theater in Pest.

Basing himself in Pest, he travelled through the Habsburg Empire for many years, including extended stays in Baja and Temesvár (now Timișoara, Romania).

In 1824, he was made a regular salaried member of the Philharmonic Society of the county of Veszprém, and his name "Rosenthal" was Magyarized to "Rózsavölgyi" (both mean 'rose valley' in German (or Yiddish) and Hungarian respectively) on the occasion of his election. (This name change was not however officially recognised until 1846). He gave several official concerts during the coronation ceremonies at Pressburg in 1825; and in 1835 he appeared at the Court Opera House in Vienna on the occasion of the Diet of Pressburg. Two years later, at the opening of the new National Theater of Pest, the Hungarian Orchestra of that city played a work composed by him for the occasion, and he subsequently became a regular member of that orchestra.

During the 1840s he formed his own band, and performed before Franz Liszt in May 1846 in Pest. Liszt used some of Rózsavölgyi's melodies in his own Hungarian Rhapsodies (nos. 8 and 12). After 1846 his health began to decline.

A number of famous Romani musicians, including Patikárus, Sárközi, Farkas, and others, were pupils of Rózsavölgyi. After his death, the Hungarian nationalist poet Sándor Petőfi sang his praises in a long poem, reproaching the Hungarian people for permitting the last years of the artist to be clouded by financial difficulties.

Rózsavölgyi died in relative poverty in Pest, and was buried there in Kozma Street Cemetery.

His son Julius (Gyula) founded a music publishing company in 1850, which still exists in Budapest. Another son, Leopold, became a doctor.

== Bibliography ==
- Ferenc Bönis, "Rózsavölgyi, Mark", Grove Music Online, ed. L. Macy (accessed 24 April 2006), grovemusic.com(subscription access).
- David Conway, Jewry in Music- Entry to the Profession from the Enlightenment to Richard Wagner, Cambridge, 2011. ISBN 978-1-107-01538-8
- Ignaz Reich, Beth-El, i. pp. 25–34, Budapest, 1878.

== Recording ==
- Rózsavölgyi: Ballroom Dances (17 dances and dance -sequences). Festetics Quartet. Hungaraton HCD 31781 (1998)
