= Hungarian Rhapsody No. 3 =

1847 composition by Franz Liszt

Hungarian Rhapsody No. 3, S.244/3, in B-flat major, is the third in a set of nineteen Hungarian Rhapsodies composed by Franz Liszt for solo piano. The rhapsody has an earlier version, like many other of Liszt's compositions: its Andante music appeared in No. 11 in the set of 21 pieces of the Magyar Dalok (1839–1847). It was composed in 1847 and published in 1853.

A typical performance of the work lasts about four to five minutes.

== Sources of the melodies ==
The first section of this rhapsody is a slow Hungarian verbunkos, but the second originates from Romania.

This rhapsody is a reworking of the 11th piece from Liszt's Magyar Dallok, Volume IV.
