= Grand Galop chromatique =

Composition for piano by Franz Liszt

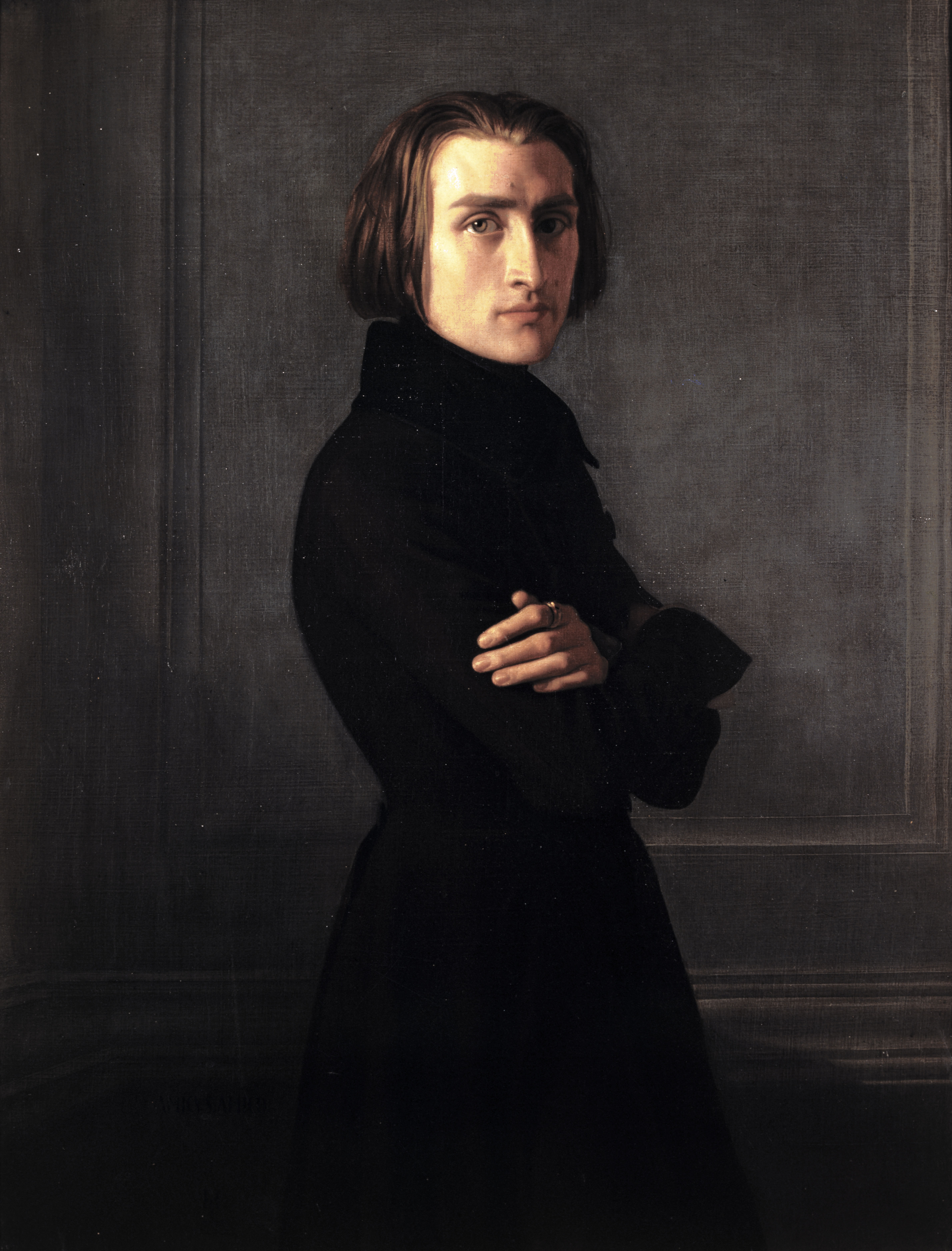
Portrait of Franz Liszt by Henri Lehmann, 1839

Grand Galop chromatique in E♭ major, S.219 is a bravura piece by Franz Liszt, composed in 1838. The galop was one of Liszt's favorite encores which he considered a "rouser". The galop chromatique was published as a piano solo and also in a version for piano duet (S.616). Among 20th century pianists, György Cziffra notably attained enormous audience success with this piece.

The galop features various technical difficulties, one of the most significant being the sixteenth-note jumps played by the right hand in bars 85 through 92, 157 through 164, and 173 through 180. Similar to the jumps studied in Liszt's étude "La campanella" but typically played far more rapidly, these jumps reach intervals of thirteen steps (two and a half octaves) at their largest. Other technical difficulties include rapid chromatic scales played by the third, fourth, and fifth fingers, and sixteenth-note jumps in the left hand.
