= Hungarian Rhapsody No. 17 =

Composition by Franz Liszt

Hungarian Rhapsody No. 17, S.244/17, in D minor, is the seventeenth Hungarian Rhapsody composed by Franz Liszt for solo piano. It was composed and published in 1882. This piece and the eighteenth rhapsody are the shortest of the Hungarian Rhapsodies, each having a duration of just over three minutes.

== Sources of the melodies ==
This Hungarian Rhapsody is based entirely on Liszt's original ideas.
