= Klänge der Heimat =

Aria from the operetta Die Fledermaus by Johann Strauss II

"Klänge der Heimat" ("Sounds of my homeland"), also called "Csárdás", is an aria for soprano from act 2 of the operetta Die Fledermaus by Johann Strauss II. It appears in many anthologies of music for soprano singers, and is frequently performed in recitals.

It is sung by Rosalinde, disguised as a masked Hungarian Countess, at Prince Orlofsky's party.

A csárdás is a traditional Hungarian dance, which usually begins with a slow introduction and continues with a fast, lively section.
