= D minor =

Minor key and scale based on the note D

- Relative key: F major
- Parallel key: D major
- Dominant key: A minor
- Subdominant key: G minor

Component pitches
- D, E, F, G, A, B♭, C

D minor is a minor scale based on D, consisting of the pitches D, E, F, G, A, B♭, and C. Its key signature has one flat. Its relative major is F major and its parallel major is D major.

The D natural minor scale is:

Changes needed for the melodic and harmonic versions of the scale are written in with accidentals as necessary. The D harmonic minor and melodic minor scales are:

== Scale degree chords ==
The scale degree chords of D minor are:

- Tonic – D minor
- Supertonic – E diminished
- Mediant – F major
- Subdominant – G minor
- Dominant – A minor
- Submediant – B-flat major
- Subtonic – C major

== Music in D minor ==
Of Domenico Scarlatti's 555 keyboard sonatas, 151 are in minor keys, and with 32 sonatas, D minor is the most often chosen minor key.

The Art of Fugue by Johann Sebastian Bach is in D minor.

Michael Haydn's only minor-key symphony, No. 29, is in D minor.

According to Alfred Einstein, the history of tuning has led D minor to be associated with counterpoint and chromaticism (for example, the chromatic fourth), and cites Bach's Chromatic Fantasia and Fugue, BWV 903, in D minor. Mozart's Requiem is written primarily in D minor, as is the famous Queen of the Night aria, "Der Hölle Rache kocht in meinem Herzen". D minor is also used prominently in Don Giovanni, most notably in the start of the overture and the scene where the statue of the Commendatore shows up at Don Giovanni's villa. Of the two piano concertos that Mozart wrote in a minor key, one of them is in D minor: Piano Concerto No. 20, K. 466. Furthermore, his String Quartet No. 13, K. 173, and String Quartet No. 15, K. 421, and the overture of Betulia liberata are also in D minor.

The only chamber music compositions in D minor by Ludwig van Beethoven are his Piano Sonata No. 17 and the Largo of the Ghost Trio Op. 70/1. Franz Schubert's String Quartet No. 14 (Death and the Maiden) is in D minor. A number of Gabriel Fauré's chamber music works are written in D minor, including the Piano Trio Op. 120, the First Piano Quintet Op. 89, and the First Cello Sonata Op. 109. Arnold Schoenberg's Verklärte Nacht is in D minor, as is his String Quartet No. 1.

Since D minor is the key of Beethoven's Symphony No. 9, Anton Bruckner felt apprehensive about writing his own Symphony No. 9 in the same key. As well as Bruckner's First Mass and Third Symphony, multiple other post-Beethoven symphonies are in D minor, including Robert Schumann's Symphony No. 4, the only Symphony written by César Franck, Dvořák's Seventh Symphony and Symphony No. 3 by Gustav Mahler.

Jean Sibelius often reserved the key of D minor for compositions he saw as being of a noble character; the Violin Concerto, the Sixth Symphony, and the string quartet Voces intimae are each in the key.

The tonality of D minor held special significance for Helene and Alban Berg.

D minor is particularly recurrent in the music of Sergei Rachmaninoff, with pieces written in the key occupying close to one eighth of his total compositional output, including the Third Piano Concerto; the Piano Sonata No. 1; the Symphony No. 1; the Trio élégiaque No. 2; the Études-Tableaux, Op. 33, No. 4; and Op. 39, No. 8; the Corelli Variations; and the symphonic poem Prince Rostislav.

Works in the classical music era and later beginning in minor typically end in major, or at least on a major chord (such as a picardy third), but there are a few notable examples of works in D minor ending in much sharper keys. Two symphonies that begin in D minor and end in E major are Havergal Brian's Gothic Symphony and Carl Nielsen's Symphony No. 4 (The Inextinguishable). Franz Liszt's Dante Symphony opens in D minor and ends in B major.

Similar to a D minor symphony ending in D major, as with Beethoven's Symphony No. 9, a D major symphony can have for its allegro first movement a slow introduction in D minor. Robbins Landon wrote that "Tonic minor Adagio introductions, especially in the key of D minor, were very popular with English composers of the year 1794", and Joseph Haydn copied this procedure for the D major symphonies he wrote in London.

Film composer Hans Zimmer is one of the most prominent users of the key of D minor in modern times. Many of his well-known scores were written in the key; notable examples are Gladiator, The Dark Knight, Pirates of the Caribbean and The Da Vinci Code. His frequent use of the key has been noticed by reviewers such as Christian Clemmensen of Filmtracks.com, who has called the trend "ridiculous stubbornness".

== Other notable compositions ==
- Georg Philipp Telemann
  - Fantasia for flute solo No. 6
  - Fantasia for viola da gamba solos No. 11
- George Frideric Handel
  - Keyboard suite in D minor (HWV 437)
- Johann Sebastian Bach
  - Toccata and Fugue, BWV 565
  - Harpsichord Concerto No. 1, BWV 1052
  - English Suite No. 6, BWV 811
  - Cello Suite No. 2, BWV 1008
  - Concerto for Two Violins, BWV 1043
  - The Art of Fugue, BWV 1080
  - Partita for solo violin No. 2, BWV 1004
- Joseph Haydn
  - Symphony No. 26 "Lamentatione"
  - Symphony No. 80
  - String Quartet, Hob.III:83
  - String Quartet, Hob.III:76 "Fifths"
  - Nelson Mass
- Wolfgang Amadeus Mozart
  - Kyrie, K. 341
  - Fantasia, K. 397
- Fanny Hensel
  - Piano Trio, Op. 11
- Felix Mendelssohn
  - Variations sérieuses, Op. 54
  - Piano Concerto No. 2, Op. 40
  - Concerto for Violin and Strings
  - Piano Trio No. 1, Op. 49
  - Symphony No. 5 "Reformation"
  - Organ Sonata No. 6
- Frédéric Chopin
  - Prelude Op. 28, No. 24 "Storm"
  - Polonaise, Op. 71 No. 1
- Franz Schubert
  - String Quartet No. 14
- Robert Schumann
  - Violin Concerto, WoO 23
  - Piano Trio No. 1, Op. 63
  - Violin Sonata No. 2, Op. 121
- Franz Liszt
  - Transcendental Étude No. 4 "Mazeppa", from S. 139, for piano
  - Hungarian Rhapsody No. 7, S. 244/7, for piano
  - Hungarian Rhapsody No. 17, S. 244/17, for piano
  - Hungarian Rhapsody No. 19, S. 244/19, for piano
  - Mazeppa, S. 100, symphonic poem
- Charles-Valentin Alkan
  - "Le Chemin de fer", Op. 27
  - "En rythme molossique", No. 2 from 12 études in all the minor keys, Op. 39
- Édouard Lalo
  - Cello Concerto
- Anton Bruckner
  - Symphony "0" (1869)
  - Mass No. 1
  - March from the 4 Orchestral Pieces
- César Franck
  - Symphony
- Johannes Brahms
  - Piano Concerto No. 1 Op. 15
  - Tragic Overture
  - Violin Sonata No. 3 Op. 108
- Modest Mussorgsky
  - Night on Bald Mountain
- Pyotr Ilyich Tchaikovsky
  - Orchestral Suite No. 1 Op. 43
- Antonín Dvořák
  - Symphony No. 4 Op. 13, B. 41
  - Symphony No. 7 Op. 70, B. 141
  - String Quartet No. 9 Op. 34
  - Serenade for Wind Instruments Op. 44
- Gabriel Fauré
  - Requiem Op. 44
  - Piano Quintet No. 1, Op. 89
  - Cello Sonata No. 1, Op. 109
  - Piano Trio, Op. 120
- Eugène Ysaÿe
  - Violin Sonata No. 3 "Ballade"
- Anton Arensky
  - Piano Trio No. 1, Op. 32
- Ralph Vaughan Williams
  - Symphony No. 8
- Sergei Prokofiev
  - Toccata for piano Op. 11
  - Symphony No. 2 Op. 40
  - Piano Sonata No. 2 Op. 14
- Aram Khachaturian
  - Violin Concerto
- Dmitri Shostakovich
  - Cello Sonata Op. 40
  - Symphony No. 5 Op. 47
  - Symphony No. 12 Op.112

== See also ==
- Chord (music)
- Chord notation
- Key (music)
- Major and minor

== Notes ==
| No. | Flats | | Sharps | |
| No. | Major | minor | Major | minor |
|---|---|---|---|---|
| 0 | C | a | C | a |
| 1 | F | d | G | e |
| 2 | B♭ | g | D | b |
| 3 | E♭ | c | A | f♯ |
| 4 | A♭ | f | E | c♯ |
| 5 | D♭ | b♭ | B | g♯ |
| 6 | G♭ | e♭ | F♯ | d♯ |
| 7 | C♭ | a♭ | C♯ | a♯ |
| 8 | F♭ | d♭ | G♯ | e♯ |
