= Rákóczi March =

Hungarian musical composition

Rákóczi March
The Marche Hongroise from Berlioz' La Damnation de Faust performed by the United States Marine Band

The "Rákóczi March" (Hungarian: Rákóczi-induló), sometimes known as the "Hungarian March" was one of the unofficial state anthems of Hungary before Ferenc Kölcsey wrote the Himnusz. It was most likely composed by Nikolaus Scholl in 1820. The melody was later used in many famous compositions, most notably: La Damnation de Faust (Hector Berlioz) and Hungarian Rhapsody No. 15 (Franz Liszt).

== Origins ==
Rákóczi Song played on the tárogató from 1908

The "Rákóczi March" originates from the "Rákóczi Song" (Hungarian: "Rákóczi-nóta"), a melody that first appeared in the mid-17th century with various lyrics. The first widely known lyrics of this song is a Kuruc poem that was a lament complaining about the misfortune of the Magyars and the Habsburg oppression, and it called back Francis II Rákóczi, the leader of the Hungarian uprising between 1703 and 1711, to save his people. Although tradition says that this version was the favourite song of Francis II Rákóczi and his court violinist, Mihály Barna, was theorized to be the composer, scholars tend to agree that it was created around 1730 by one or more anonymous composers. This variant was very popular in the 18th century, became a folksong with more than 20 versions, and was sung even after the 1848 revolution. It gave inspiration to the poets Sándor Petőfi, Ferenc Kölcsey and Kálmán Thaly.

The instrumental version, referred as "Rákóczi March", appeared almost 100 years later, in the early decades of the 19th century. The composer of this variant remains uncertain; however, it was Nicolaus Scholl who first published his own compositions under this title in 1819 or in 1820, and most likely formed the currently known form of this song. He was the conductor of the 32nd Regiment of the Army of the Habsburg Monarchy that consisted of mostly Hungarians and was led by Nikolaus II, Esterházy at this time. He was surely influenced by János Bihary who reportedly played instrumental variants of the song between 1809 and 1820.

== Famous compositions ==
In 1846, Hector Berlioz arrived in Pest-Buda (today's Budapest) to give two concerts to popularize his compositions. For this occasion, as it was usual in his era, he composed a few pieces for Hungarian melodies to win the favour of the audience. One of these pieces was an adaptation of the Rákóczi March that immediately became the favourite one of the audience as he noted in his memoirs: "... the hall was shaken by unprecedented shouting and stamping of feet. ... We had to start again but on the second occasion, too, the audience could hardly or not at all control themselves, just like on the first occasion." With some modifications, he included this composition later in La Damnation de Faust, too, and this version is the best known variant to date.

Between 1823 and 1871 Franz Liszt wrote a number of arrangements, including his Hungarian Rhapsody No. 15, based on the theme. Pianist Vladimir Horowitz composed a variation on the "Rákóczi March" with elements of both the Liszt and Berlioz versions, which greatly expands on the bravura and flash of the Liszt composition. Béla Bartók, Johannes Brahms, Johann Strauss Jr., Zoltán Kodály, and Ferenc Erkel also incorporated the melody in some of their compositions.

== Usage ==
Today the tune is heard usually as an instrumental, without the lyrics. The Berlioz version has become a popular folk-music selection in Hungary, especially for weddings. The March is played at state and military celebrations and is the official inspection march of the Hungarian Defence Forces. The tune was used for decades as the morning signal of Kossuth Rádió at the beginning of the daily broadcast. The march gave its name to a 1933 Austrian-Hungarian feature film—Rakoczy-Marsch—starring Gustav Fröhlich (who also directed), Camilla Horn, Leopold Kramer and others. The March is also featured prominently in the French historical drama La Grande Vadrouille.

== See also ==
- The national anthem of Hungary, "Himnusz"
- Traditional unofficial national anthem of Hungary, "Szózat"
