= Hungarian Rhapsody No. 18 =

Composition by Franz Liszt

Hungarian Rhapsody No. 18, S.244/18, in F♯ minor, is the eighteenth Hungarian Rhapsody composed by Franz Liszt for solo piano. An average performance of the piece lasts three minutes. Along with its predecessor, the seventeenth rhapsody, it is the shortest Hungarian Rhapsody of the set. This rhapsody is subtitled Ungarische Ausstellung in Budapest.

== Sources of the melodies ==
This Hungarian Rhapsody is based entirely on Liszt's original ideas.
