= Hungarian Rhapsody No. 10 =

Composition by Franz Liszt

Liszt Hungarian Rhapsody No. 10

Hungarian Rhapsody No. 10 in E major, S.244/10, is a composition for solo piano by Franz Liszt. It is tenth in the set of his Hungarian Rhapsodies, and is subtitled Preludio, although this name is not commonly used. It, along with the rest of the first fifteen rhapsodies, were published in 1853.

== Composition ==
After a brief introduction with three glissando-like passages in a rather free time, the tempo changes to Andante deciso, and the first theme is introduced. After a cadenza, the tempo changes to Allegretto capriccioso and a much darker theme is introduced, this time in the parallel minor of E minor. Despite the fact that it is a much darker theme, the carefree feel of the piece remains. After some time, there is a fairly long cadenza filled with trills between the hands, as the key modulates freely. The glissando-like passages return to be a repeated theme for the rest of the piece, especially when the tempo changes to a much faster Vivace and the key changes to C major. This results in many glissandos, sometimes in both hands. After this, the darker second theme returns in E minor, this time sempre forte brioso, meaning always loud and spirited. Before the end of the piece, the key changes back to E major, the original key, and a new theme is introduced. The piece ends in loud, booming chords in both hands. A typical performance time is around 5 minutes.

The piece is one of the more popular Hungarian Rhapsodies.

== Sources of the melodies ==
The entire rhapsody is based on Béni Egressy's Fogadj Isten, which was published in May 1846 in honor of Liszt.
