= Hungarian Rhapsody No. 4 =

Composition by Franz Liszt

Hungarian Rhapsody No. 4, S.244/4, in E-flat major, is the fourth in a set of nineteen Hungarian Rhapsodies composed by Franz Liszt for solo piano. It was composed in 1847 and published in 1853.

A typical performance of the work lasts about five minutes.

== Sources of the melodies ==
This rhapsody is a reworking of the 7th piece from Liszt's Magyar Dallok, Volume II. The first part is a slow verbunkos melody of unknown origin, but the other parts likely originate from the works of Antal Csermák.
