= Hungarian Rhapsody No. 16 =

Composition by Franz Liszt

Hungarian Rhapsody No. 16, S.244/16, in A minor is the sixteenth Hungarian Rhapsody composed by Franz Liszt for solo piano. It was composed and published in 1882. The rhapsody, subtitled Budapest Munkácsy-Festlichkeiten, has a duration of approximately five minutes and is dedicated to Mihály Munkácsy. It was arranged for piano four-hands by the composer himself, marked as S.622, published in the same year. The piece begins with an outset of the main theme, A Minor, but with a distinct ambiguity of tonality. This section ends with a cadenza. The following section introduces a new theme, marked Lassan Langsam, and also ends with a cadenza. The third section is a repeat of the second section, but transposed to B-flat Minor. The fourth section of the piece repeats the theme from the first section and segues to the Friska of the piece, marked Allegro con Brio. This introduces the parallel major to A Minor (A Major) as the tonic and continues with lively variations on the first theme. The piece concludes with octaves ascending the keyboard in A Major arpeggios and is finished on four final A Major chords.

The first version, S.244/16i, was published earlier during the same year by the same publisher. It lacks the cadenza in the first section, among other changes.

== Sources of the melodies ==
This Hungarian Rhapsody is based entirely on Liszt's original ideas.
