= Hungarian Fantasy (Liszt) =

Composition for piano and orchestra by Franz Liszt

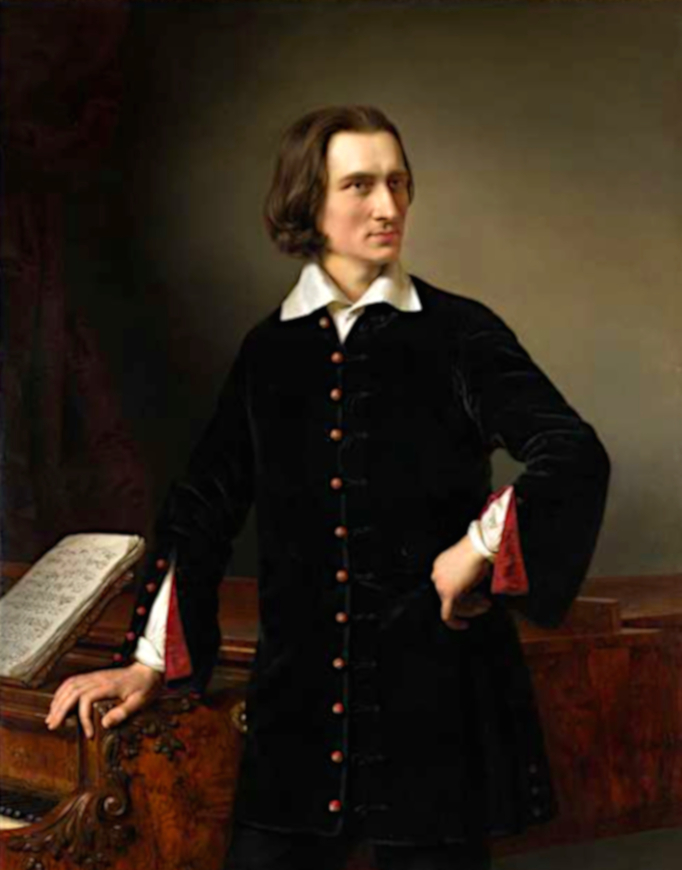
Franz Liszt, portrait by Hungarian painter Miklós Barabás, 1847

The Fantasia on Hungarian Folk Melodies (German: Fantasie über ungarische Volksmelodien, Hungarian: Fantázia magyar népi dallamokkal), commonly known in short form simply as the Hungarian Fantasy, is Franz Liszt's arrangement for piano and orchestra of his Hungarian Rhapsody No. 14, originally for solo piano. The Fantasia was written in 1852 and premiered in Pest on June 1, 1853, with Hans von Bülow as soloist and Ferenc Erkel conducting the orchestra.

== Overview ==
During Liszt's lifetime, his Hungarian Rhapsodies were among his most popular works. Because of this popularity, he may have been under pressure to produce versions of them for piano and orchestra. The present work is the only such work that Liszt is known to have produced. However he may, at the end of his life, have helped his student Sophie Menter with her Concerto in the Hungarian Style (1885), a work which was clearly influenced by the Hungarian Fantasy.

A slow introduction by the orchestra is followed by a solo cadenza before proceeding to the main body of the work. The bold, marchlike main theme of the work, as in the version for solo piano, is the Hungarian folk song "Mohac's Field", with a long-short-short-long rhythm. While much of the piece's thematic material is derived from this song, there is also a section in A minor marked "in gypsy style" (alla zingarese).

While the Fantasia is in the same style and tradition as the Hungarian Rhapsodies, it differs structurally from them. The Rhapsodies generally present a clear succession of two traditional scales — lassan, and friska. These dances are evident in the Fantasia, particularly in the long and brilliant friska section. However, Liszt is freer and wider-ranging in his combination and juxtaposition of material than he usually is in this type of work.

== Bibliography ==
- ed. Ewen, David, The Complete Book on Classical Music (Englewood Cliffs, New Jersey: Prentice-Hall, Inc., 1965). Library of Congress Card Catalog Number 65-11033
- Headington, Christopher, Notes to Deutsche Grammophon 5262148, Liszt: Orchestral Works; Shura Cherkassky, piano; Berlin Philharmonic Orchestra conducted by Herbert von Karajan.
- ed Walker, Alan, Franz Liszt: The Man and His Music, (New York, Taplinger Publishing Company, 1970). ISBN 0-8008-2990-5
  - Collet, Robert, "Works for Piano and Orchestra"
- Walker, Alan, Franz Liszt, Volume 2: The Weimar Years, 1848-1861 (New York: Alfred A. Knopf, 1989). ISBN 0-394-52540-X
