= János Bihari =

Hungarian Romani violinist

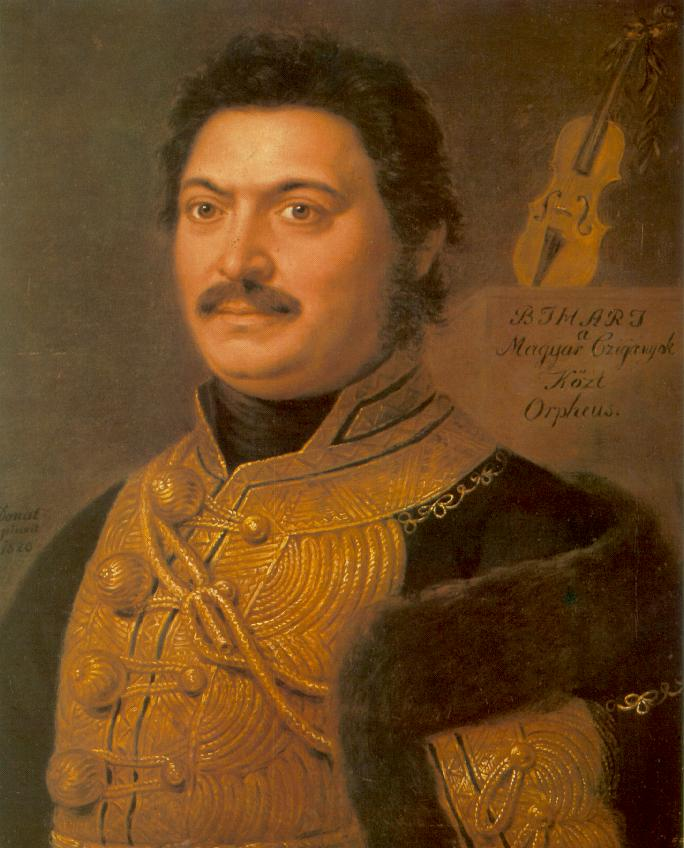
János Bihari

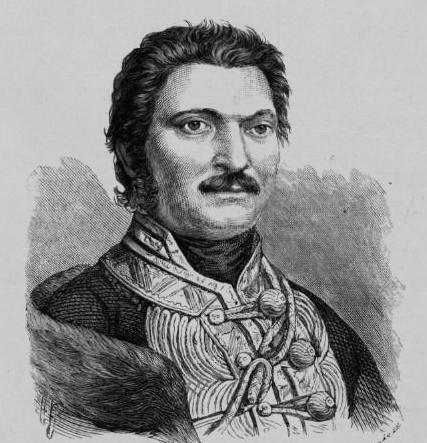
János Bihari

János Bihari (21 October 1764 – 26 April 1827) was an influential Hungarian Romani violinist. He is one of the founders of Romani academic music and the musical genre verbunkos.

By the middle of the nineteenth century, "Gypsy music" was elevated to high fashion, the first great was that of János Bihari, the pianist Franz Liszt described: "The tones sung by his magic violin flow on our enchanted ears like the tears...".

== Biography ==
Bihari was born into a Romani family in Nagyabony, Hungary (today Veľké Blahovo, Slovakia); his father was a violinist. In 1801, living in Pest, Bihari created an orchestra of 1 cimbalomist and 4 violinists. This orchestra became popular soon and visited with Bihari many towns in Hungary and abroad. In every country Bihari learnt local folk and academic music and arranged it to play during his performances. Bihari was so popular that he could live like a noble man: he had expensive clothes and a servant who held Bihari's violin, he stayed in luxurious hotels, etc. He was also invited to play for the Emperor of Austria.

Bihari's melodies were used by such composers as Franz Liszt, Ludwig van Beethoven, Pablo de Sarasate and others.

In 1824 Bihari injured his left hand, thus impairing his ability to perform. Subsequently, his popularity declined, and he died in poverty in Pest.

Bihari left 84 musical compositions that are considered to be classic.
