= Ján Cifra =

Slovak volleyball player (born 1955)

Personal information
- Nationality: Slovak
- Born: 21 October 1955 (age 69); Topoľčany, Czechoslovakia

Sport
- Sport: Volleyball

Ján Cifra (born 21 October 1955) is a Slovak volleyball player. He competed in the men's tournament at the 1980 Summer Olympics.
