= Cifra (musical genre) =

In Argentina and Uruguay Cifra is a genre of traditional melody with accompaniment, associated with usually improvised lyrics.

In this genre the lyrics are improvised by two competing performers;by two or more participants taking turns, based on impromptu or made-up stanzas; or by a solo performer who improvises on a topic requested by his audience. But the cifra is mainly the song of the "payadores" (singers from Argentinian Pampa) who improvise in opposition. The way in which this interrupted song is combined and linked to the strumming of the guitar is the most characteristic of it and, a characteristic unique among American songbooks.

In fact, the song dialogues with the guitar. A series of strummed chords serves as a prelude. When the singer raises his voice, the guitar goes silent. Once one or two verses are finished, the strumming or some grave note punctuated by a brief interlude breaks again, and thus, the verse runs to the end. No having measure for interludes or account for repetitions of verses, the form is more or less free. In the best times of the genre, it was used as a confrontation between two singers to change sharp questions or answers in strophe.

While strumming the initial prelude, the payador thinks about his first question and, launched to sing the verses, interrupts and interludes as much as he needs to continue thinking about the idea or the versification; keep it up until it complete the thought and stanza. At that moment his opponent choose the verse of the question and initiates his response in the same way. An improviser is all the more skilled the less the number of repetitions and interludes required to be versed.
