= Polonaise in C (Beethoven) =

Solo piano piece by Ludwig van Beethoven

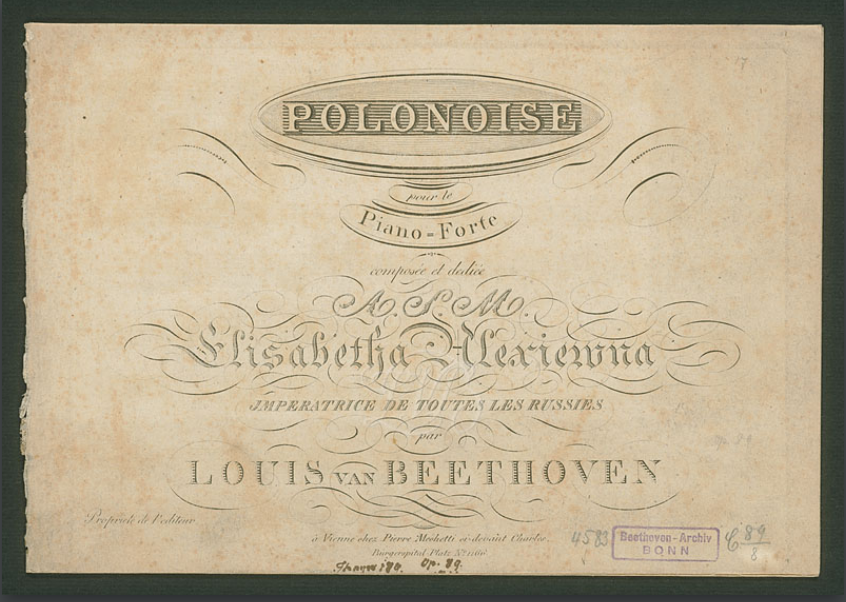
Cover of the first edition

The Polonaise in C major, Op. 89, by Ludwig van Beethoven is a polonaise for solo piano, published in 1815. He composed it in December 1814, at a time when the polonaise was becoming a popular dance and class marker among the European nobility. Beethoven was presented as a prominent artist at the ongoing Congress of Vienna, where he met the visiting Russian Empress Elizabeth Alexeievna. He dedicated the polonaise to the Empress, and was compensated with a sum of 50 ducats. The piece is Beethoven's first and only published standalone polonaise, and is notable as a precursor to Chopin's more well-known polonaises.

== Structure ==
The piece is marked Alla Polacca, vivace (as a polonaise, lively). After four bars, there is a brief barless passage of ascending and descending scales moving to adagio (slow) and then to più presto (faster). At the conclusion of this unusual introduction, the piece returns to the first tempo and meter, and the polonaise rhythm and main theme are introduced. The piece ends with a lengthy coda. It takes about five minutes to perform.
