= György Cziffra Jr. =

Hungarian conductor

György Cziffra Jr. (Hungarian: [ˈɟørɟ ˈt͡sifrɒ]; 1943 – 17 November 1981) was a Hungarian conductor.

== Biography ==
His father was the pianist György Cziffra who had served in the Hungarian forces during World War II. He was arrested for political reasons by communist authorities after World War II. In 1956 the family fled Hungary, settling in France.

He trained as a pianist, but decided to turn to conducting. He and his father worked together on several recordings and live performances.

Cziffra died in a fire at his house in the Paris suburbs. His father was heartbroken, and from that day on he never performed or recorded with an orchestra again.
