= Breath mark =

Music symbol

A breath mark

A breath mark or luftpause is a symbol used in musical notation. It directs the performer of the music passage to take a breath (for wind instruments and vocalists) or to make a slight pause (for other instruments). This pause is normally intended to shorten the duration of the preceding note and not to alter the tempo; in this function it can be thought of as a grace rest. It is usually placed above the staff and at the ends of phrases.

The breath mark is visually similar to a comma.

A common misconception is that breath marks indicate a bow lift to bowed string instruments; however, it actually represents that the musician gets a “breath” of time while they are playing.
