= József Kossovits =

Hungarian composer and cellist

József Kossovits (born after 1750; died after 1819, possibly in Košice) was a Hungarian composer and cellist.

Kossovits was employed by various members of the Hungarian nobility, including the Andrássy family. Many of his compositions are dances in the verbunkos style. Some of his melodies were used by Franz Liszt, who believed them to be of Hungarian Gypsy origin, in his Hungarian Rhapsodies.

== Sources ==
- Grove's Dictionary of Music and Musicians
- Alan Walker, Franz Liszt, the Virtuoso Years 1811-1847 (1988) ISBN 0-571-15278-3
