= Hungarian Rhapsody No. 19 =

Composition by Franz Liszt

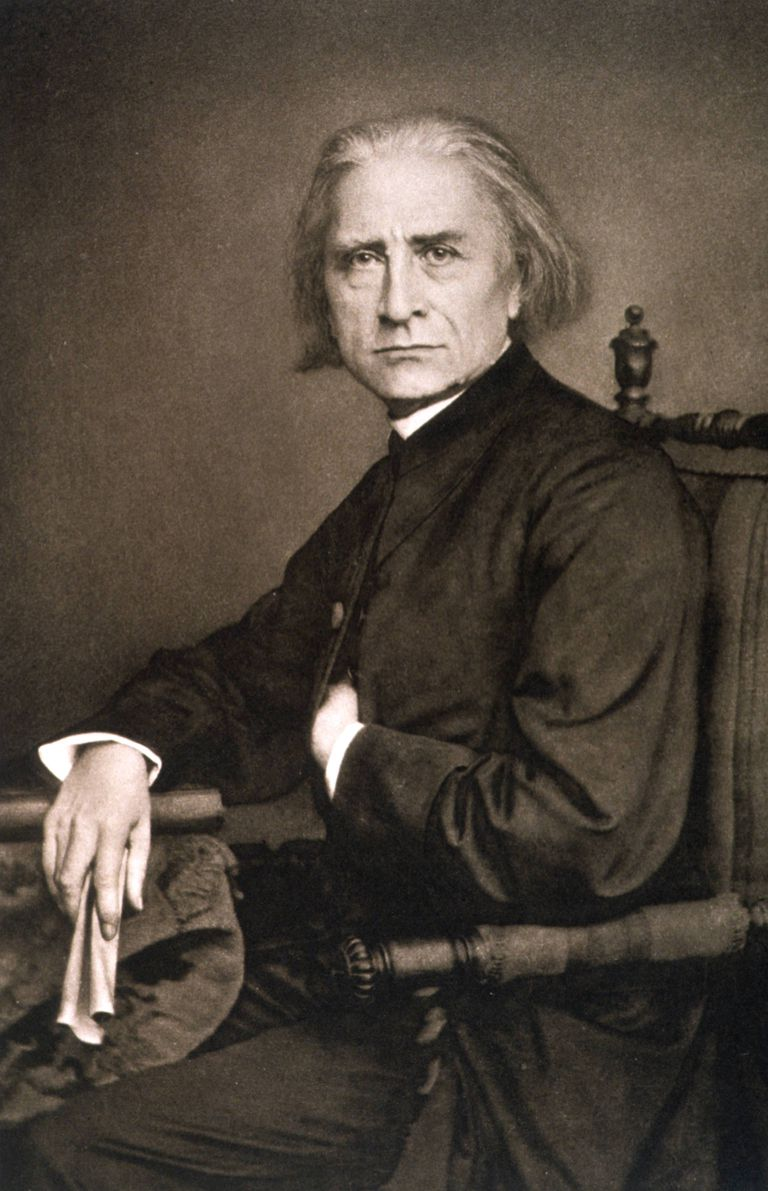
Liszt in June 1867, photo by Franz Hanfstaengl.

Hungarian Rhapsody No. 19 (S.244/19) in D minor is the last of a set of 19 Hungarian Rhapsodies by the Hungarian composer Franz Liszt. It was written in 1885.

== Background ==
Hungarian Rhapsody No. 19 is based on the Csárdás nobles by Kornél Ábrányi, better known as a music critic than as a composer.

== Analysis ==
The piece begins with a sharp theme, beginning in the lower register but moving up and down the piano several times. Slowly the theme develops more Hungarian character and also becomes more interesting. Halfway through the piece, the mood changes drastically and a memorable four-note melody is introduced, taking the main focus of this section. This theme is repeated many times, although from time to time is varied in different ways. In the climax and ending of the piece, we revisit some of Liszt’s flashy writing from his youth.

This Rhapsody normally lasts about ten minutes.

== Horowitz transcription ==
The pianist Vladimir Horowitz wrote his own piano transcription of the 19th Rhapsody, remarking to Thomas Frost that Liszt was "quite old" when he composed it. To elaborate, Horowitz said that "it has wonderful ideas, but they are sketchy sometimes, not developed. That's why it needed to be transcribed." On the transcription itself, Horowitz mentions some "doubling and expanding" in the lassan section, while changing the form of the friska section, noting that Liszt "repeats the same thing," describing it as "a little bit naïve."

Another aspect of Horowitz's transcription was the ending, which he made "more brilliant ... but not brilliancy for its own sake". Horowitz also told Frost:

It is rather bravura for the sake of the musical spirit of the piece. And very Hungarian, too. This rhapsody may not be as showy as its predecessors, but in my humble estimation it is more daring, more advanced harmonically and ... difficult enough.
