= Ede Szerdahelyi =

Hungarian pianist and composer

Ede Szerdahelyi (1820–1880) was a Hungarian pianist and composer who had been imprisoned in Olmütz for his participation in the Hungarian uprising of 1848. He studied with Franz Liszt in Weimar, Germany, from January to 13 July 1851, when he moved to London and subsequently to the United States. On his return to Pest in 1877 he visited his friend Liszt who had dedicated his Hungarian Rhapsody Nr. 1 in E major S. 244/1, which had been composed by 1846 as Rêves et fantaisies S. 243b and first published about November 1851, to him.
