= Csárdás =

Hungarian folk dance

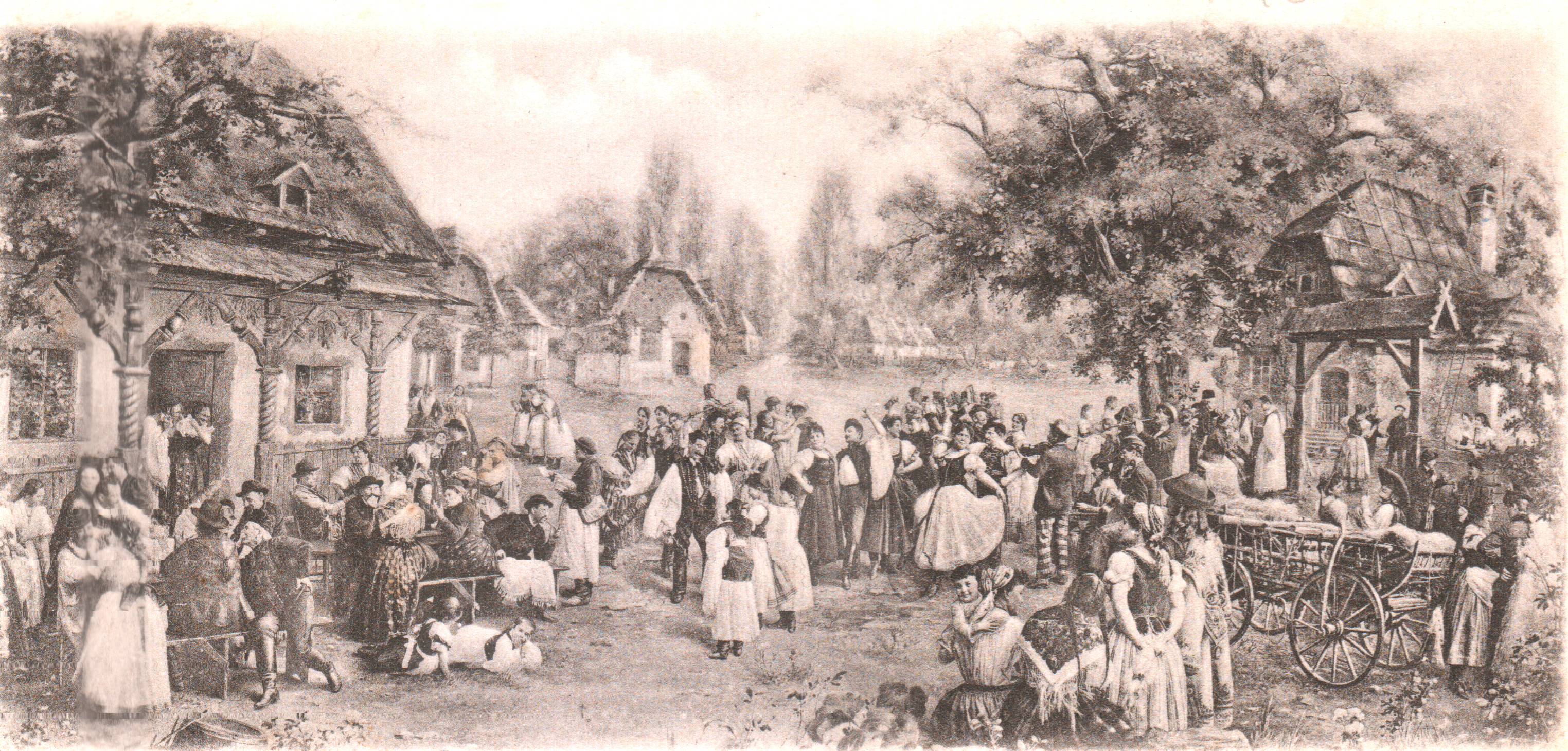
Csárdás

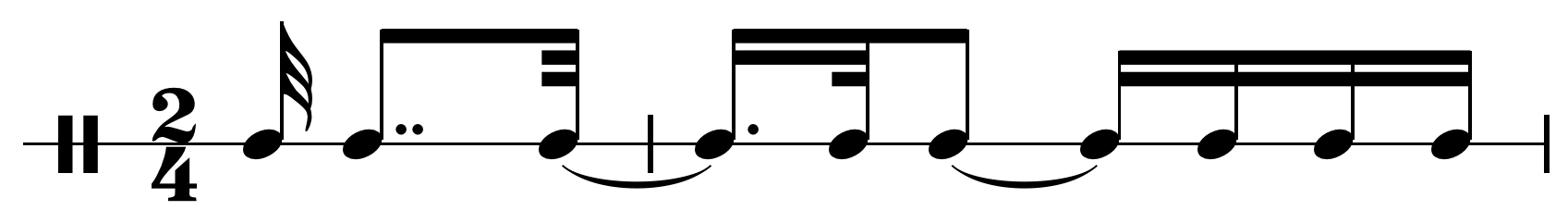
Csárdás rhythm.

Csárdás (/ˈtʃɑːrdæʃ/, US: /-dɑːʃ/; Hungarian: [ˈt͡ʃaːrdaːʃ]), often seen as Czárdás, is a traditional Hungarian folk dance, the name derived from csárda (old Hungarian term for roadside tavern and restaurant). It originated in Hungary and was popularized by bands in Hungary as well as neighboring countries and regions such as of Slovenia, Burgenland, Croatia, Transylvania, Slovakia, Poland, Vojvodina and Moravia, as well as among the Banat Bulgarians, including those in Bulgaria.

The original folk csárdás, as opposed to the later international variants, is enjoying a revival in Hungary thanks to the táncház movement.

The dance is also popular among Romani people.

== History ==
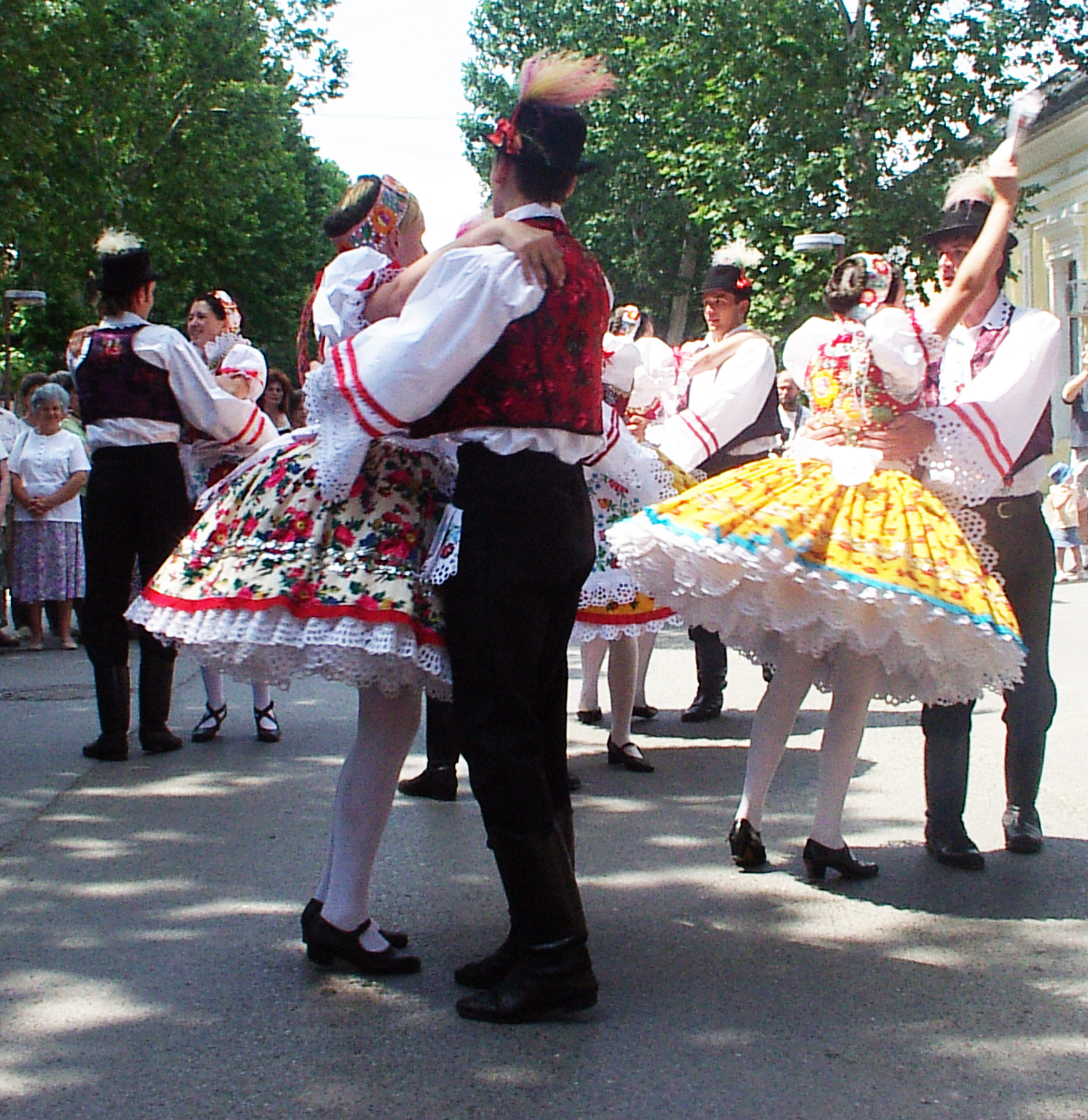
Hungarians in Serbia, Doroslovo, dancing the csárdás

The origin of the csárdás can be traced back to the 18th century Hungarian music genre the verbunkos, where the 'verbunk' was used as a recruiting dance by the Austrian army.

== Music ==
The csárdás is characterized by a variation in tempo: it starts out slowly (lassú) and ends in a very fast tempo (friss, literally "fresh"). There are other tempo variations, called ritka csárdás, sűrű csárdás and szökős csárdás. The music is in 2/4 or 4/4 time. The dancers are both male and female, with the women dressed in traditional wide skirts, which form a distinctive shape when they whirl.

Csárdás
"Csárdás" (1904) by Vittorio Monti, performed by the United States Air Force Band

Classical composers who have used csárdás themes in their works include Emmerich Kálmán, Franz Liszt, Johannes Brahms, Léo Delibes, Johann Strauss, Pablo de Sarasate, Pyotr Ilyich Tchaikovsky, Franz von Suppé, Vittorio Monti, and others. The csárdás "Klänge der Heimat" from Strauss' operetta Die Fledermaus, sung by the character Rosalinde, is probably the most famous example of this dance in vocal music. One of the best-known examples of instrumental csárdás is the composition by Vittorio Monti for violin and piano. This virtuoso piece has seven tempo variations.

== See also ==
- Márk Rózsavölgyi, "the father of csárdás"

== Bibliography ==
- Sárosi, Bálint (1977). Zigeunermusik [Gypsy Music] (in German). Atlantis Musikbuch-Verlag. ISBN 3761105037. OL 5035416W.
