= Friska =

Term in Hungarian folk dance

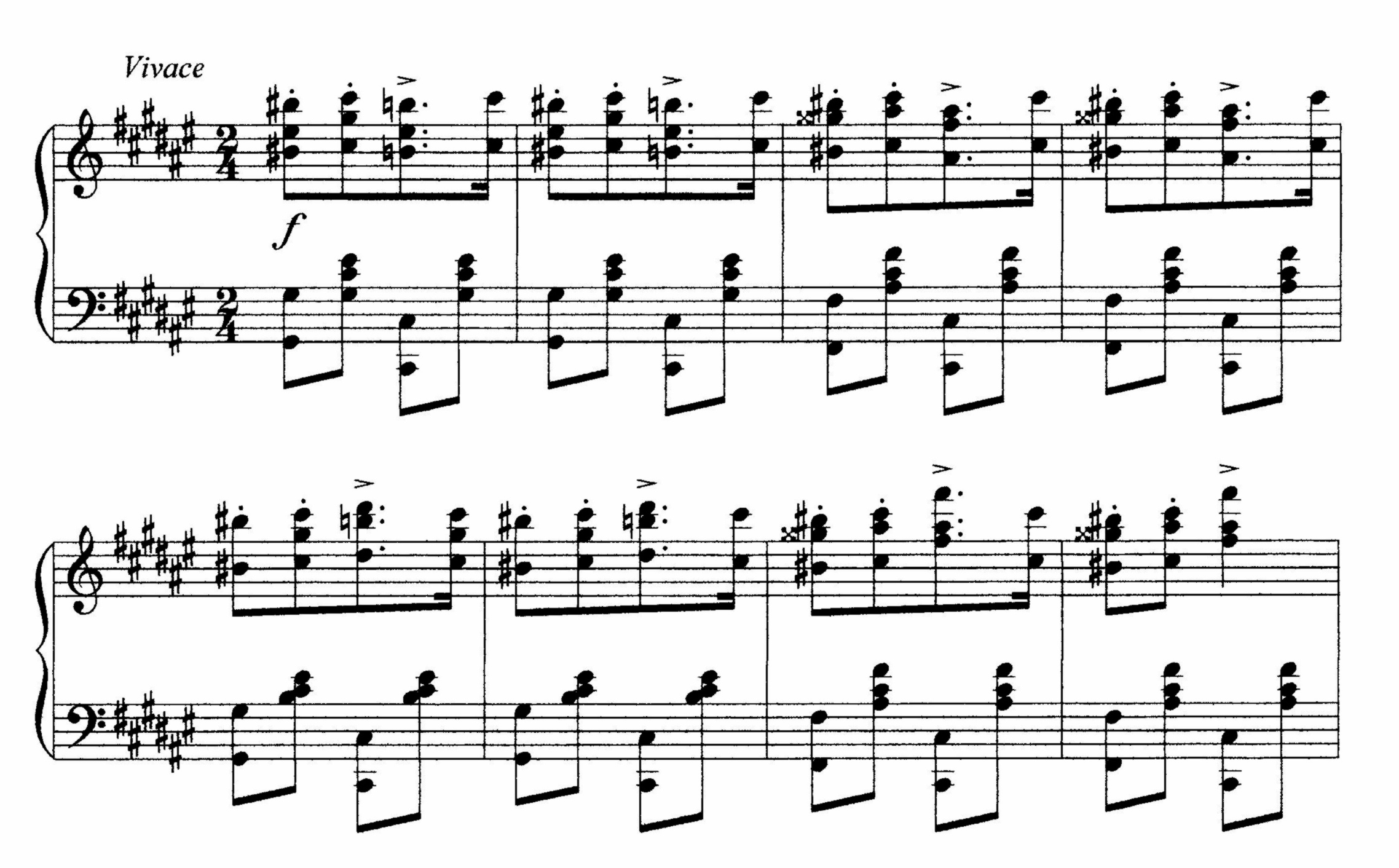
Main part of Franz Liszt's Hungarian Rhapsody #2.

Friska, also known as Friss, (from Hungarian: friss, fresh, pronounced frish) is a term used in Hungarian folk dance. It is used in Hungarian dances where there is a sudden shift to a faster tempo in a certain section of the dance. This faster tempo section is called the friss or friska. Examples of Hungarian folk dances which have a friska section include the csárdás and the verbunkos.

Portions of Liszt's Hungarian Rhapsodies (all except rhapsodies 3, 5 and 17) take their form from the csárdás and contain a friska section. The friska is generally either turbulent or jubilant in tone. The Friska of Hungarian Rhapsody No. 2 is also the most well-known of the Hungarian Rhapsodies.

== See also ==
- Lassan
