= Lassan (music) =

Slow section of a Hungarian folk dance

Lassan (Hungarian for "slowly") or more properly lassú ("slow") is the slow section of the csárdás, a Hungarian folk dance, or of most of Liszt's Hungarian Rhapsodies, which take their form from this dance. It generally either has a dark, somber tone or a formal, stately one.

== See also ==
- Friska
