= Verbunkos =

Hungarian dance and musical style

Verbunkos (Hungarian: [ˈvɛrbuŋkoʃ]), other spellings being Verbounko, Verbunko, Verbunkas, Werbunkos, Werbunkosch, Verbunkoche) is a Hungarian dance and music genre.

The verbunkos is typically in a pair of sections, slow (lassú), with a characteristic dotted rhythm, and fast (friss), with virtuosic running-note passages. In some cases, this slow-fast pair alternates at greater length.

The name is derived from the German word Werbung, a noun derived from the verb werben that means, in particular, "to recruit"; verbunkos—recruiter. This music and dance was played during military recruiting before the Habsburg emperors, who were also kings of Hungary, introduced conscription in 1849. A group of a dozen hussars performed the dance in different parts, with the leading sergeant opening with slow movements, then the lower officers joining for more energetic parts, and the youngest soldiers concluding the dance with jumps and spur-clicking.

Despite its name, the melodies originate from Hungarian folk and popular music and have been sometimes attributed to Romani people (Gypsies), because the accompaniment was usually played by Romani musicians in characteristic Romani style.

The Romani composer János Bihari (1764–1827) remains the most well-known composer and interpreter of verbunkos. Eighty-four compositions of his remain. Bihari was a violinist who played in the court in Vienna during the entire Congress of Vienna in 1814. Another composer of verbunkos was József Kossovits (d. c. 1819).

With the establishment in 1837 of the Hungarian National Theatre in Pest, the verbunkos style began to change under the influence of the first director of the theatre and operatic composer, Ferenc Erkel, whose most successful operas were Hunyadi László (1844) and Bánk bán (1861).

Haydn incorporated verbunkos into the "Gypsy Rondo" piano trio, composed in 1795. Béla Bartók's Contrasts (1938), a trio for clarinet, piano and violin, is in three movements, the first of which is named Verbunkos. His Violin Concerto No. 1 is also an example of verbunkos style.

== Slovácko verbuňk ==
The Slovácko verbuňk is also an improvised folk dance in the South Moravia and Zlín districts of the Czech Republic, and was inscribed in 2008 on the Representative List of the Intangible Cultural Heritage of Humanity of UNESCO.

== See also ==
- Schuhplattler
