= Transcriptions by Franz Liszt =

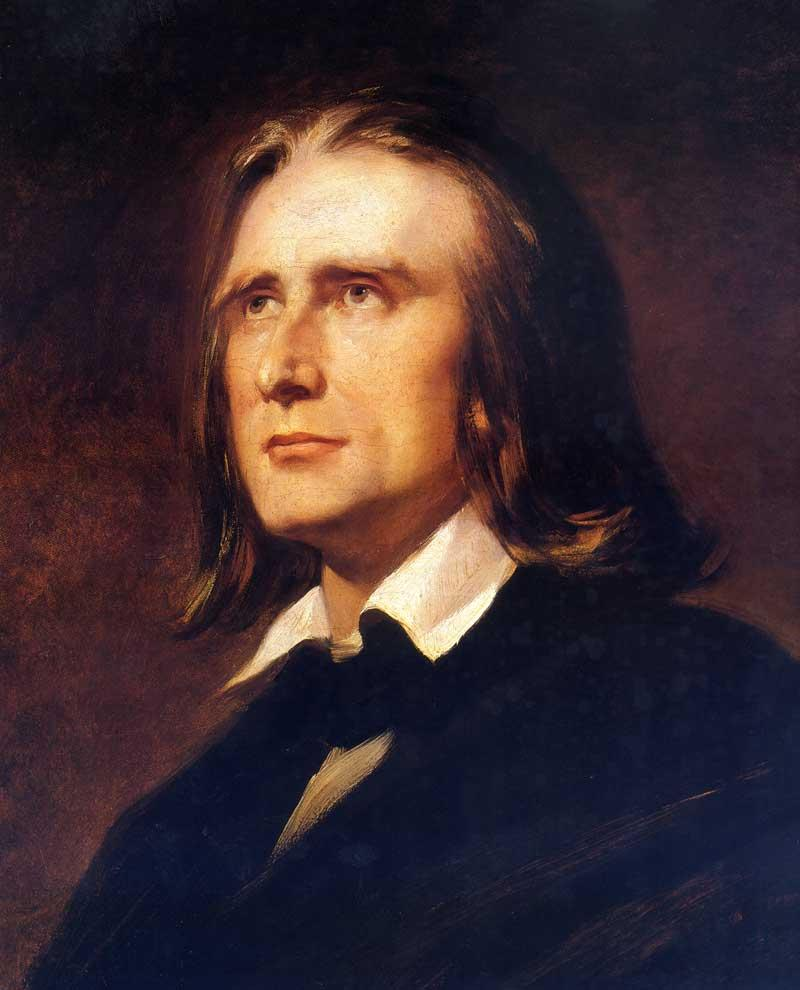
Franz Liszt, after an 1856 painting by Wilhelm von Kaulbach

This article lists the various treatments given by Franz Liszt to the works of almost 100 other composers.

These treatments included transcriptions for other instruments (predominantly solo piano), arrangements, orchestrations, fantaisies, reminiscences, paraphrases, illustrations, variations, and editions.

Liszt also extensively treated his own works in a similar manner, but these are not tallied here—neither are his treatments of national (or "folk") melodies whose composers are unknown, nor other anonymous works.

In most cases, Liszt arranged only one or two pieces by a composer, but he delved more deeply into the works of Bach, Beethoven, Bellini, Berlioz, Chopin, Donizetti, Gounod, Mendelssohn, Meyerbeer, Mozart, Rossini, Schubert, Schumann, Verdi, Wagner, and Weber.

The earliest-born composer whose works Liszt dealt with was Orlande de Lassus (born c. 1532). Jacques Arcadelt was born earlier (c. 1507), but Liszt's treatment was not of Arcadelt's original work, rather of a setting by Pierre-Louis Dietsch loosely based on Arcadelt. The last composer to die whose works Liszt dealt with was Géza Zichy (1849–1924).

== Kornél Ábrányi ==
Original work	Liszt work	Forces	Date	S no.	Notes
Tamássy József kedvelt dalai, 16 Hungarian folksongs, voice and piano: Five songs	5 Ungarische Volkslieder	piano	1873	S.245	
Virág-dal (Chant des Fleurs), piano, Op. 43 (c. 1875)	Additions and corrections	piano	1880	S.383a	
Elegáns csárdások (Csárdás nobles), 6 vols. (1884–86): "Kertem alatt" (Vol. II, No. 1); "Sarkantyú csárdás" (Vol. III, No. 6)	Hungarian Rhapsody No. 19 in D minor	piano	1885	S.244/19	
Elegáns csárdások (Csárdás nobles), 6 vols. (1884–86): "Kertem alatt" (Vol. II, No. 1); "Sarkantyú csárdás" (Vol. III, No. 6)	Hungarian Rhapsody No. 19 in D minor	piano 4-hands	1885?	S.623a	

== Gregorio Allegri ==
Original work	Liszt work	Forces	Date	S no.	Notes
Miserere mei, Deus (1630s)	À la chapelle Sixtine (organ version: Evocation à la Chapelle Sixtine)	piano	1862	S.461	This piece combines Allegri's Miserere with Mozart's Ave verum corpus, K.618 (1791). (Mozart was deeply involved in the circumstances that led to the first publication of the Miserere: He heard it in the Sistine Chapel when visiting Rome at the age of 15, and famously wrote it down from memory, although publishing the work or even writing it down was prohibited on pain of excommunication. Rather than imposing this penalty, however, the Pope later congratulated Mozart on his genius).; À la chapelle Sixtine was the basis of the third movement (Preghiera) of Tchaikovsky's "Mozartiana" (Orchestral Suite No. 4), but he used only the Ave verum corpus component.
Miserere mei, Deus (1630s)	À la chapelle Sixtine (organ version: Evocation à la Chapelle Sixtine)	organ	c. 1862	S.658	
Miserere mei, Deus (1630s)	À la chapelle Sixtine (organ version: Evocation à la Chapelle Sixtine)	piano 4‑hands	c. 1865	S.633	
Miserere mei, Deus (1630s)	À la chapelle Sixtine (organ version: Evocation à la Chapelle Sixtine)	orchestra	?	S.360	

== Alexander Alyabyev ==
Original work	Liszt work	Forces	Date	S no.	Notes
Song "The Nightingale" (1825)	Deux Mélodies russes: No. 1, "Le Rossignol, air russe d'Alabieff"	piano	1842	S.250/1	No. 2 was Chanson bohémienne, after a work by Pyotr Bulakhov

Note: The Mazurka pour piano composée par un amateur de St. Pétersbourg, paraphrasée par F. L. (S.384) was based on a mazurka that has often been misattributed to Alyabyev, but was in fact written by Mikhail Vielgorsky.

== Jacques Arcadelt ==
Original work	Liszt work	Forces	Date	S no.	Notes
Three-part madrigal Nous voyons que les hommes	Alleluja et Ave Maria d'Arcadelt	piano	1862	S.183	The Alleluja was based on themes from Liszt's own Cantico del sol di San Francesco d'Assisi, S.4. The Ave Maria was based on Pierre-Louis Dietsch's Ave Maria, a setting for unaccompanied voices (1842?) loosely based on Arcadelt's madrigal Nous voyons que les hommes.
Three-part madrigal Nous voyons que les hommes	Alleluja et Ave Maria d'Arcadelt	organ	1862	S.659	The Alleluja was based on themes from Liszt's own Cantico del sol di San Francesco d'Assisi, S.4. The Ave Maria was based on Pierre-Louis Dietsch's Ave Maria, a setting for unaccompanied voices (1842?) loosely based on Arcadelt's madrigal Nous voyons que les hommes.

== Thomas Arne ==
Original work	Liszt work	Forces	Date	S no.	Notes
Song "Rule, Britannia!" (1740)	Grande paraphrase de concert sur "God Save the Queen" et "Rule Britannia"	piano	1841	S.694	Grove says this was unfinished, and refers to it as "Fantasia on English themes" (piano solo). The Grosse Fantasie was a reworking of the Grande paraphrase de concert.
Song "Rule, Britannia!" (1740)	Grosse Fantasie über "God Save the Queen" und "Rule Britannia"	piano 4-hands	1841	S.755a	Grove says this was unfinished, and refers to it as "Fantasia on English themes" (piano solo). The Grosse Fantasie was a reworking of the Grande paraphrase de concert.

== Daniel Auber ==
Original work	Liszt work	Forces	Date	S no.	Notes
Opera La muette de Portici (1828)	Tarantelle di bravura d'après la tarantelle de La Muette de Portici	piano	1846	S.386	
Opera La muette de Portici (1828)	Two pieces on themes from La muette de Portici	piano		S.387	One of the pieces is on the Berceuse
Opera La fiancée (1829): Aria "Montagnard ou berger"	Grande Fantaisie sur la tyrolienne de l'opéra La Fiancée	piano	1829	S.385	Published as Op. 1; dedicated to Frédéric Chopin
Opera La fiancée (1829): Aria "Montagnard ou berger"	"Tyrolean Melody"	piano	1829	S.385a	

== Johann Sebastian Bach ==
Original work	Liszt work	Forces	Date	S no.	Notes
Cantata Weinen, Klagen, Sorgen, Zagen, BWV 12	Prelude on the theme of Weinen, Klagen, Sorgen, Zagen	piano	1859	S.179	The Variations, S.180/673 are based on the same theme.
Cantata Weinen, Klagen, Sorgen, Zagen, BWV 12	Variations on a theme of Bach (aka Variations on Weinen, Klagen, Sorgen, Zagen)	piano	1862	S.180	This set of variations uses the basso continuo of the second movement of the cantata Weinen, Klagen, Sorgen, Zagen, base for the Crucifixus from the Mass in B minor. It is based on the same theme as the Prelude, S.179.
Cantata Weinen, Klagen, Sorgen, Zagen, BWV 12	Variations on a theme of Bach (aka Variations on Weinen, Klagen, Sorgen, Zagen)	organ	1863	S.673	This set of variations uses the basso continuo of the second movement of the cantata Weinen, Klagen, Sorgen, Zagen, base for the Crucifixus from the Mass in B minor. It is based on the same theme as the Prelude, S.179.
Cantata Ich hatte viel Bekümmernis, BWV 21: Introduction and Fugue	Einleitung und Fuge aus der Motette 'Ich hatte viel Bekümmernis' und Andante 'Aus tiefer Not'	organ	1860	S.660	
Cantata Aus tiefer Not schrei ich zu dir, BWV 38: Andante	Einleitung und Fuge aus der Motette 'Ich hatte viel Bekümmernis' und Andante 'Aus tiefer Not'	organ	1860	S.660	
Great Fantasia and Fugue in G minor, BWV 542 (organ)	Fantasia and Fugue in G minor	piano	pub. 1863	S.463	
6 Preludes and Fugues (organ), BWV 543–548	6 Preludes and Fugues	piano	1842–50	S.462	The Preludes and Fugues are: 1. A minor, BWV 543; 2. C major, BWV 545; 3. C minor, BWV 546; 4. C major, BWV 547; 5. E minor, BWV 548; 6. B minor, BWV 544
Chaconne in D minor, BWV 1004	Transcription	piano	1880	–	Liszt planned this transcription but never executed it.
Sonata No. 4 in C minor, violin and harpsichord, BWV 1017: III. Adagio	Adagio vom Bach	organ	1861–63	S.661	Liszt arranged only the final 4 bars, the rest being the work of Alexander Wilhelm Gottschalg (1827–1908).

== Giuseppe Baini ==
Original work	Liszt work	Forces	Date	S no.	Notes
Chorus "O Roma nobilis"	Arrangement	mixed chorus and orchestra	c. 1879	S.54	
Chorus "O Roma nobilis"	Arrangement	organ	c. 1879	S.669c	
Chorus "O Roma nobilis"	Arrangement	piano	c. 1879	S.506b	

== Ludwig van Beethoven ==
Original work	Liszt work	Forces	Date	S no.	Notes
Song "Adelaide", Op. 46 (1795)	Transcription	piano	1839	S.466	
Septet in E♭, Op. 20 (1800)	Transcription	piano	1841	S.465	Dedicated to Grand Duchess Maria Pavlovna of Russia
Septet in E♭, Op. 20 (1800)	Transcription	piano 4‑hands	1841	S.634	Dedicated to Grand Duchess Maria Pavlovna of Russia
Piano Concerto No. 3 in C minor, Op. 37 (1800)	Arrangement	2 pianos	1878–79	S.657a/1	Includes a new cadenza for 1st movement, S.389a.
6 Gellert Lieder, Op. 48 (1802)	Sechs geistliche Lieder	piano	1840	S.467	Liszt's order of the songs (with the original order in brackets) was: 1 (5). "Gottes Macht und Vorsehung"; 2 (1). "Bitten"; 3 (6). "Bußlied"; 4 (3). "Vom Tode"; 5 (2) "Die Liebe des Nächsten"; 6 (6). "Die Ehre Gottes aus der Natur (Die Himmel rühmen)".
Piano Concerto No. 4 in G major, Op. 58 (1806)	Arrangement	2 pianos	1878–79	S.657a/2	
Coriolan Overture, Op. 62 (1807)	Transcription	piano	?	S.739	Lost
6 Songs, Op. 75 (1809)	"Beethoven's Lieder von Goethe": 1. "Mignon", Kennst du das Land, Op. 75/1; 2. "Mit einem gemalten Band", Op. 83/3; 3. "Freudvoll und leidvoll", Op. 84/4; 4. "Mephistos Flohlied", Es war einmal ein König, Op. 75/3; 5. "Wonne der Wehmut", Op. 83/1; 6. "Die Trommel gerühret", Op. 84/1	piano	1849	S.468	Liszt combined parts of three disparate Beethoven opuses into his transcription, the common thread being that all the words were by Goethe: from 6 Songs, Op. 75: No. 1 ("Mignon") was S.468/1; No. 3 ("Mephistos Flohlied") was S.468/4; from 3 Songs, Op. 83: No. 1 ("Wonne der Wehmut") became S.468/5; No. 3 ("Mit einem gemalten Band") was S.468/2; from the Egmont incidental music, Op. 84: No. 1 (Lied "Die Trommel gerühret") was S.468/6; and No. 4 (Lied "Freudvoll und leidvoll") became S.468/3.
3 Songs, Op. 83 (1810)	"Beethoven's Lieder von Goethe": 1. "Mignon", Kennst du das Land, Op. 75/1; 2. "Mit einem gemalten Band", Op. 83/3; 3. "Freudvoll und leidvoll", Op. 84/4; 4. "Mephistos Flohlied", Es war einmal ein König, Op. 75/3; 5. "Wonne der Wehmut", Op. 83/1; 6. "Die Trommel gerühret", Op. 84/1	piano	1849	S.468	Liszt combined parts of three disparate Beethoven opuses into his transcription, the common thread being that all the words were by Goethe: from 6 Songs, Op. 75: No. 1 ("Mignon") was S.468/1; No. 3 ("Mephistos Flohlied") was S.468/4; from 3 Songs, Op. 83: No. 1 ("Wonne der Wehmut") became S.468/5; No. 3 ("Mit einem gemalten Band") was S.468/2; from the Egmont incidental music, Op. 84: No. 1 (Lied "Die Trommel gerühret") was S.468/6; and No. 4 (Lied "Freudvoll und leidvoll") became S.468/3.
Egmont, incidental music, Op. 84 (1810)	"Beethoven's Lieder von Goethe": 1. "Mignon", Kennst du das Land, Op. 75/1; 2. "Mit einem gemalten Band", Op. 83/3; 3. "Freudvoll und leidvoll", Op. 84/4; 4. "Mephistos Flohlied", Es war einmal ein König, Op. 75/3; 5. "Wonne der Wehmut", Op. 83/1; 6. "Die Trommel gerühret", Op. 84/1	piano	1849	S.468	Liszt combined parts of three disparate Beethoven opuses into his transcription, the common thread being that all the words were by Goethe: from 6 Songs, Op. 75: No. 1 ("Mignon") was S.468/1; No. 3 ("Mephistos Flohlied") was S.468/4; from 3 Songs, Op. 83: No. 1 ("Wonne der Wehmut") became S.468/5; No. 3 ("Mit einem gemalten Band") was S.468/2; from the Egmont incidental music, Op. 84: No. 1 (Lied "Die Trommel gerühret") was S.468/6; and No. 4 (Lied "Freudvoll und leidvoll") became S.468/3.
Egmont, incidental music, Op. 84 (1810)	Overture	piano	?	S.740	Lost
Piano Concerto No. 5 in E♭, "Emperor", Op. 73 (1811)	Arrangement	2 pianos	1878–79	S.657a/3	
The Ruins of Athens, incidental music, Op. 113 (1811)	Capriccio alla turca sur des motifs de Beethoven (Ruines d'Athènes)	piano	1846	S.388	Uses same theme as the Fantasia, S.389
The Ruins of Athens, incidental music, Op. 113 (1811)	Fantasia on (themes from) 'The Ruins of Athens'	piano and orchestra	1848–52	S.122	Uses same theme as the Capriccio, S.388; FP of orch. version Budapest, 1 June 1853, Hans von Bülow (piano), Ferenc Erkel (conductor); same concert as the FP of the Hungarian Fantasy
The Ruins of Athens, incidental music, Op. 113 (1811)	Fantasia on (themes from) 'The Ruins of Athens'	2 pianos	after 1852	S.649	Uses same theme as the Capriccio, S.388; FP of orch. version Budapest, 1 June 1853, Hans von Bülow (piano), Ferenc Erkel (conductor); same concert as the FP of the Hungarian Fantasy
The Ruins of Athens, incidental music, Op. 113 (1811)	Fantasia on (themes from) 'The Ruins of Athens'	piano	pub. 1865	S.389	Uses same theme as the Capriccio, S.388; FP of orch. version Budapest, 1 June 1853, Hans von Bülow (piano), Ferenc Erkel (conductor); same concert as the FP of the Hungarian Fantasy
Song cycle An die ferne Geliebte, Op. 98 (1816)	Transcription	piano	1849	S.469	
9 Symphonies (1800–24)	Transcription	piano	1837–64	S.464	Symphonies Nos. 5, 6 and 7 were transcribed in 1837; the Marcia funèbre of Symphony No. 3 was written in 1841; then there was a gap of 22 years before the remaining symphonies were written, at which time the existing transcriptions were revised. In the meantime, Liszt completed a transcription of Symphony No. 9 for two pianos in 1851.
Symphony No. 9 "Choral", Op. 125 (1824)	Transcription	2 pianos	1851	S.657	Symphonies Nos. 5, 6 and 7 were transcribed in 1837; the Marcia funèbre of Symphony No. 3 was written in 1841; then there was a gap of 22 years before the remaining symphonies were written, at which time the existing transcriptions were revised. In the meantime, Liszt completed a transcription of Symphony No. 9 for two pianos in 1851.
String quartets (1800–26)	Projected transcription	piano	1863	–	Liszt planned to transcribe the quartets for piano but never executed the plan.

== Vincenzo Bellini ==
Original work	Liszt work	Forces	Date	S no.	Notes
Opera La sonnambula (1831)	Fantaisie sur des motifs favoris de l'opéra La Sonnambula	piano	1839	S.393	
Opera La sonnambula (1831)	Fantaisie sur des motifs favoris de l'opéra La Sonnambula	piano 4‑hands	c. 1852	S.627	
Opera Norma (1831)	Reminiscences de Norma	piano	1841	S.394	
Opera Norma (1831)	Reminiscences de Norma	2 pianos	after 1841	S.655	
Opera I puritani (1835)	Reminiscences des Puritains	piano	1836	S.390	Dedicated to Princess Belgiojoso. The latter section was re-used in the Introduction et Polonaise (S.391).
Opera I puritani (1835)	I Puritani: Introduction et Polonaise	piano	1840	S.391	The Polonaise is the latter section of the Reminiscences, S.390
Opera I puritani (1835)	Hexameron, morceau de concert. Grandes Variations de Bravoure sur le marche des Puritains	piano	1837	S.392	Includes variations by Frédéric Chopin, Carl Czerny, Henri Herz, Johann Peter Pixis and Sigismond Thalberg. Dedicated to Princess Belgiojoso. The 2-piano version is much shortened. An extant version for piano and orchestra is by an unknown hand – possibly that of Charles-Valentin Alkan.
Opera I puritani (1835)	Hexameron, morceau de concert. Grandes Variations de Bravoure sur le marche des Puritains	2 pianos	after 1837	S.654	Includes variations by Frédéric Chopin, Carl Czerny, Henri Herz, Johann Peter Pixis and Sigismond Thalberg. Dedicated to Princess Belgiojoso. The 2-piano version is much shortened. An extant version for piano and orchestra is by an unknown hand – possibly that of Charles-Valentin Alkan.

== Hector Berlioz ==
Original work	Liszt work	Forces	Date	S no.	Notes
Overture Les francs-juges, Op. 3 (1826)	Ouverture des Francs-Juges	piano	1833	S.471	
Overture Le carnaval romain, Op. 9 (1843)	Transcription	piano	?	S.741	This was part of Liszt's performing repertoire, but is now lost
Symphonie fantastique, Op. 14 (1830)	Episode de la vie d'un artiste. Grande Symphonie fantastique. Partition de Piano	piano	c. 1833	S.470	In c. 1864–65 Liszt made a new transcription of the 4th movement, "Marche au supplice".
Symphonie fantastique, Op. 14 (1830)	L'idée fixe. Andante amoroso	piano	c. 1833	S.395	Based on the theme of the Symphonie
Lélio, Op. 14b (1831)	Grande Fantaisie Symphonique on themes from Berlioz’ Lélio	piano and orchestra	1834	S.120	The themes are "Chant du pêcheur" and "Chant des brigands"; according to Leslie Howard: "the original manuscript of this work, long undiscovered, recently surfaced at auction in France (although sadly not in its entirety), and it revealed immediately that Liszt carried out his own orchestration"; FP Paris, 24 November 1834, Liszt (piano), Berlioz (conductor)
Overture Le roi Lear, Op. 4 (1831)	Ouverture du Roi Lear	piano	1836	S.474	
Harold en Italie, Op. 16 (1834)	Transcription	viola and piano	1836	S.472	
Harold en Italie, Op. 16 (1834)	Marche des Pèlerins	piano	1836	S.473	
Opera Benvenuto Cellini, Op. 23 (1838)	Bénédiction et serment, deux motifs de Benvenuto Cellini	piano	1852	S.396	
Opera Benvenuto Cellini, Op. 23 (1838)	Bénédiction et serment, deux motifs de Benvenuto Cellini	piano 4‑hands	1853	S.628	
La damnation de Faust, Op. 24 (1846)	Danse des Sylphes	piano	c. 1846	S.475	

== Louise Bertin ==
Original work	Liszt work	Forces	Date	S no.	Notes
Opera La Esmeralda (1836)	Transcription of orchestral score	piano	1837	S.476	
No. 10, "D'ici vous pourrez voir, sans être vu"	3 morceaux detachés d‘Esmeralda	piano	1837	S.477a	
No. 11, "Quoi! lui"	3 morceaux detachés d‘Esmeralda	piano	1837	S.477a	
No. 13, Quasimodo's aria "Mon Dieu! j'aime"	3 morceaux detachés d‘Esmeralda	piano	1837	S.477a	
No. 13, Quasimodo's aria "Mon Dieu! j'aime"	Air chanté par Massol	piano	1837	S.477	Massol was the baritone Jean-Étienne-Auguste Massol, who created the role of Quasimodo.

== János Bihari ==
Original work	Liszt work	Forces	Date	S no.	Notes
Lassú magyar, Hungarian slow dance (c.1820)	"Zum Andenken", 2 movements of Hungarian character	piano	1828	S.241/2	Bihari's dance was used in the second movement; the first was based on music by László Fáy.

== Giovanni Bononcini ==
Original work	Liszt work	Forces	Date	S no.	Notes
Canzonetta "Vado ben spesso cangiando loco"	Années de pèlerinage, Deuxième année: Italie: No. 3 "Canzonetta del Salvator Rosa"	piano	1849	S.161/3	This song, among many others, was long attributed to Salvator Rosa.

== Alexander Borodin ==
Original work	Liszt work	Forces	Date	S no.	Notes
Paraphrases (piano; 1879): No. 2, Polka in C major	Prélude à la Polka d'Alexandre Porfiryevitch Borodine	piano	1880	S.207a	This was previously catalogued as Variation über das Thema von Borodin, S.256 (which was also referred to as Variations on the "Chopsticks" theme).

== René de Galard de Béarn, Marquis de Brassac ==
Original work	Liszt work	Forces	Date	S no.	Notes
"Pastorale"	Chanson du Béarn	piano	1844	S.236/2	Brassac's piece is not otherwise identified. Liszt's arrangement was published as No. 2 of "Faribolo Pastour and Chanson du Béarn".

== Pyotr Bulakhov ==
Original work	Liszt work	Forces	Date	S no.	Notes
"Bohemian Song"	Deux Mélodies Russes: No. 2, "Chanson bohémienne"	piano	1842–43	S.250/2	No. 1 was "Le Rossignol, air russe d'Alabieff", after "The Nightingale" by Alexander Alyabyev.
Song "You Will Not Believe"	Russischer Galop	piano	1843	S.478	

== Hans von Bülow ==
Original work	Liszt work	Forces	Date	S no.	Notes
Mazurka-Fantasie, Op. 13 (piano; 1860)	Orchestration	orchestra	1865	S.351	
Wenn sie euch grüsst mit freundlicher Gebärde ("Dante's Sonett"), Op. 22 (1865)	Transcription, as Tanto gentile e tanto onesta	piano	1874	S.479	

== Frédéric Chopin ==
Original work	Liszt work	Forces	Date	S no.	Notes
Mazurka in C♯ minor, Op. 6/2 (piano; 1830)	Duo (Sonata) sur des thèmes polonais	violin and piano	1832–35	S.127	
24 Preludes, Op. 28 (piano; pub. 1839): No. 4 in E minor; No. 9 in E major	Transcription	organ	1862–63	S.662	
Piano Sonata No. 2 in B♭ minor, Op. 35: III. Marche funèbre	Transcription	organ, cello and piano	?	S.761	Lost
Fantaisie in F minor, piano, Op. 49	Transcription	piano and orchestra	–	–	This was planned but never executed.
17 Polish songs, Op.posth. 74 (1827–47): No. 1, "Życzenie" ("The Maiden's Wish"	Glanes de Woronince: II. "Mélodies polonaises"	piano	1847–48	S.249/2	The order of the songs in S.480 is: 1. "Mädchens Wünsch" (= No. 1, "Życzenie"); 2. "Frühling" (= No. 2, "Wiosna"); 3. "Das Ringlein" (= No. 14, "Pierścień"); 4. "Bacchanal" (= No. 4, "Hulanka"); 5. "Meine Freuden" (= No. 12, "Moja pieszczotka"); 6. "Heimkehr" (= No. 15, "Narzeczony") "Das Ringlein" leads without a break into "Bacchanal", and towards the end of the latter song, immediately before the coda, Liszt includes a short 6-bar reprise of the earlier song.
17 Polish songs, Op.posth. 74 (1827–47): No. 1, "Życzenie" ("The Maiden's Wish"	6 Chants polonais	piano	1847–60	S.480	The order of the songs in S.480 is: 1. "Mädchens Wünsch" (= No. 1, "Życzenie"); 2. "Frühling" (= No. 2, "Wiosna"); 3. "Das Ringlein" (= No. 14, "Pierścień"); 4. "Bacchanal" (= No. 4, "Hulanka"); 5. "Meine Freuden" (= No. 12, "Moja pieszczotka"); 6. "Heimkehr" (= No. 15, "Narzeczony") "Das Ringlein" leads without a break into "Bacchanal", and towards the end of the latter song, immediately before the coda, Liszt includes a short 6-bar reprise of the earlier song.
No. 2, "Wiosna" ("Spring"); No. 4, "Hulanka" ("Merrymaking"); No. 12, "Moja pieszczotka" ("My Joys"); No. 14, "Pierścień" ("The Ring"); No. 15, "Narzeczony" ("The Bridegroom")	6 Chants polonais	piano	1847–60	S.480	The order of the songs in S.480 is: 1. "Mädchens Wünsch" (= No. 1, "Życzenie"); 2. "Frühling" (= No. 2, "Wiosna"); 3. "Das Ringlein" (= No. 14, "Pierścień"); 4. "Bacchanal" (= No. 4, "Hulanka"); 5. "Meine Freuden" (= No. 12, "Moja pieszczotka"); 6. "Heimkehr" (= No. 15, "Narzeczony") "Das Ringlein" leads without a break into "Bacchanal", and towards the end of the latter song, immediately before the coda, Liszt includes a short 6-bar reprise of the earlier song.

== August Conradi ==
Original work	Liszt work	Forces	Date	S no.	Notes
2 Zigenuerpolkas, Op. 5 (orchestra; 1843): No. 2 in E minor	Le Célèbre Zigeunerpolka	piano	1848	S.481	Conradi was Liszt's copyist at Weimar for a number of years, and a minor composer in his own right.

== Peter Cornelius ==
Original work	Liszt work	Forces	Date	S no.	Notes
2nd overture to opera Der Barbier von Bagdad,	Completion	orchestra	1877	S.352	Completed by Liszt from Cornelius's sketches

== Guillaume Louis Cottrau ==
Original work	Liszt work	Forces	Date	S no.	Notes
Tarantella	Venezia e Napoli (1st version): No. 4, Tarantelles napolitaines	piano	1840	S.159	The Tarantella is not otherwise identified. S.162 is a revision of S.159.
Tarantella	Années de pèlerinage, Deuxième Année: Italie. Supplement: Venezia e Napoli: No. 3, Tarantella da Guillaume Louis Cottrau	piano	1859	S.162	The Tarantella is not otherwise identified. S.162 is a revision of S.159.

== César Cui ==
Original work	Liszt work	Forces	Date	S no.	Notes
Tarantelle, Op. 12 (orchestra; 1858)	Transcription	piano	1885	S.482	

== Alexander Dargomyzhsky ==
Original work	Liszt work	Forces	Date	S no.	Notes
Tarantella slave (piano 4-hands, 1864–65)	Tarantelle, transcrite et amplifiée pour le piano à deux mains	piano	1879	S.483	

== Ferdinand David ==
Original work	Liszt work	Forces	Date	S no.	Notes
Bunte Reihe, 24 pieces in all the major and minor keys, Op. 30, violin and piano (c.1840; pub 1851)	Transcription	piano	1850	S.484	
No. 19 in A major ("Ungarisch")	Fantasy	piano	?	S.484/19bis	
No. 22 in B♭ minor ("In russischer Weise")	Souvenir de Russie	piano	1842	S.483bis	This publication contained no attribution to Ferdinand David as the source of the material.

== Léo Delibes ==
Original work	Liszt work	Forces	Date	S no.	Notes
Opera Jean de Nivelle (1880): Ballade "Tant que le jour dure"	La mandragore	piano	1881	S.698	

== Josef Dessauer ==
Original work	Liszt work	Forces	Date	S no.	Notes
3 Lieder: "Lockung", "Zwei Wege", "Spanisches Lied" (by 1845)	Lieder	piano	1847	S.485	

== Anton Diabelli ==
Original work	Liszt work	Forces	Date	S no.	Notes
Waltz	Variation on a Waltz by Diabelli	piano	1822	S.147	One of 50 variations on the same waltz written by 50 different composers for Vaterländischer Künstlerverein. Liszt's variation was No. 24.

== Pierre-Louis Dietsch ==
Original work	Liszt work	Forces	Date	S no.	Notes
Ave Maria	Alleluja et Ave Maria d'Arcadelt	piano	1862	S.183	The Alleluja was based on themes from Liszt's own Cantico del sol di San Francesco d'Assisi, S.4. The Ave Maria was based on Dietsch's Ave Maria, a setting for unaccompanied voices (1842?) loosely based on Jacques Arcadelt's three-part madrigal Nous voyons que les hommes.
Ave Maria	Alleluja et Ave Maria d'Arcadelt	organ	1862	S.659	The Alleluja was based on themes from Liszt's own Cantico del sol di San Francesco d'Assisi, S.4. The Ave Maria was based on Dietsch's Ave Maria, a setting for unaccompanied voices (1842?) loosely based on Jacques Arcadelt's three-part madrigal Nous voyons que les hommes.

== Gaetano Donizetti ==
Original work	Liszt work	Forces	Date	S no.	Notes
Opera Lucrezia Borgia (1833)	Reminiscences de Lucrezia Borgia	piano	1840	S.400	The sections are: (1) Trio du second acte and (2) Fantaisie sur des motifs favoris de l'opéra: Chanson à boire (Orgie), Duo and Finale.
Opera Lucia di Lammermoor (1835)	Reminiscences de Lucia di Lammermoor	piano	1835–36	S.397	Based on the Sextet
Opera Lucia di Lammermoor (1835)	Marche et cavatine de Lucie de Lammermoor	piano	1835–36	S.398	Intended as part of the Reminiscences (S.397) but separated by the publisher
Lucia di Lammermoor	Valse à capriccio sur deux motifs de Lucia et Parisina	piano	1842	S.401	Combines motifs from Lucia di Lammermoor and Parisina. The Valse à capriccio, S.401 was revised as No. 3 of 3 Caprices-Valses, S.214 (1850–52).
Opera Parisina (1833)	Valse à capriccio sur deux motifs de Lucia et Parisina	piano	1842	S.401	Combines motifs from Lucia di Lammermoor and Parisina. The Valse à capriccio, S.401 was revised as No. 3 of 3 Caprices-Valses, S.214 (1850–52).
Nuits d'été à Pausilippe, 12 ariettas and nocturnes (voices and chamber ensemble; 1836): No. 1, "Barcajuolo"; No. 9, "L'Alito di Bice"; No. 4, "La Torre di Biasone"	Nuits d'été à Pausilippe	piano	1838	S.399	
Opera La favorite (1840): Duettino (Act IV)	Spirto gentil	piano	1847	S.400a	Possibly same as S.742.
Opera Dom Sébastien (1843): Funeral march	Marche funèbre de Dom Sébastien	piano	1844	S.402	
Act IV	Paraphrase	piano	?	S.744	Lost; this was based on Theodor Kullak's transcription (paraphrase), Op. 31, which was itself dedicated to Liszt.
"Duettino"	Transcription	piano	?	S.742	Lost. Possibly same as S.400a.

== Giuseppe Donizetti ==
Original work	Liszt work	Forces	Date	S no.	Notes
Mecidiye March	Grande Paraphrase de la marche de Donizetti composée pour Sa Majesté le sultan Abdul Medjid-Khan	piano	1847	S.403	Giuseppe was the elder brother of the opera composer Gaetano Donizetti. A simplified version of this paraphrase was also published.

== Felix Draeseke ==
Original work	Liszt work	Forces	Date	S no.	Notes
Song "Helges Treue"	Recitation "Helges Treue"	voice/piano	1860	S.686	
Cantata Der Schwur im Rütli (1862–63, rev. 1868)	Reduction of Part I	piano	1870	S.485a	

== Béni Egressy and Ferenc Erkel ==
Original work	Liszt work	Forces	Date	S no.	Notes
Patriotic songs, "Szózat" (Egressy) and "Himnusz" (Erkel)	"Szózat und Ungarischer Hymnus"	orchestra	1870‑73	S.353	"Szózat" (words Mihály Vörösmarty, 1836; music Egressy, 1840) and "Himnusz" (words Ferenc Kölcsey, 1823; music Erkel) are national anthems of Hungary adopted in 1844; FP of orchestral version, Budapest, 19 March 1873, Liszt (conductor).
Patriotic songs, "Szózat" (Egressy) and "Himnusz" (Erkel)	"Szózat und Ungarischer Hymnus"	piano	1870‑73	S.486	"Szózat" (words Mihály Vörösmarty, 1836; music Egressy, 1840) and "Himnusz" (words Ferenc Kölcsey, 1823; music Erkel) are national anthems of Hungary adopted in 1844; FP of orchestral version, Budapest, 19 March 1873, Liszt (conductor).
Patriotic songs, "Szózat" (Egressy) and "Himnusz" (Erkel)	"Szózat und Ungarischer Hymnus"	piano 4‑hands	1870‑73	S.628a	"Szózat" (words Mihály Vörösmarty, 1836; music Egressy, 1840) and "Himnusz" (words Ferenc Kölcsey, 1823; music Erkel) are national anthems of Hungary adopted in 1844; FP of orchestral version, Budapest, 19 March 1873, Liszt (conductor).

== Ferenc Erkel ==
Original work	Liszt work	Forces	Date	S no.	Notes
Patriotic song "Himnusz"	"Szózat und Ungarischer Hymnus"	see above			Erkel's Himnusz was combined with Béni Egressy's "Szózat" in three versions.
Opera Hunyadi László (1844)	Schwanengesang and March	piano	1847	S.405	Liszt was the godfather of Erkel's son, who was born in the autumn of 1856 but died in 1863.

== Ernest II, Duke of Saxe-Coburg and Gotha ==
Original work	Liszt work	Forces	Date	S no.	Notes
Song "Die Gräberinsel" (1842)	Transcription	piano	1842	S.485b	Ernest II, Duke of Saxe-Coburg and Gotha was an amateur composer; he was the brother of Queen Victoria's consort Prince Albert.
Opera Tony, oder die Vergeltung (1849)	Halloh! Jagdchor und Steyrer	piano	1849	S.404	Ernest II, Duke of Saxe-Coburg and Gotha was an amateur composer; he was the brother of Queen Victoria's consort Prince Albert.
Opera Diana von Solange (1858)	Festmarsch nach Motiven von E.H.z.S.-C.-G.	orchestra	1857	S.116	Ernest II, Duke of Saxe-Coburg and Gotha was an amateur composer; he was the brother of Queen Victoria's consort Prince Albert.
Opera Diana von Solange (1858)	Festmarsch nach Motiven von E.H.z.S.-C.-G.	piano	1859	S.522	Ernest II, Duke of Saxe-Coburg and Gotha was an amateur composer; he was the brother of Queen Victoria's consort Prince Albert.
Opera Diana von Solange (1858)	Festmarsch nach Motiven von E.H.z.S.-C.-G.	piano 4‑hands	1859	S.607	Ernest II, Duke of Saxe-Coburg and Gotha was an amateur composer; he was the brother of Queen Victoria's consort Prince Albert.

== László Fáy ==
Original work	Liszt work	Forces	Date	S no.	Notes
Kinizsi notája, Hungarian dance (1822)	"Zum Andenken", 2 movements of Hungarian character	piano	1828	S.241/1	Fáy's dance was used in the first movement; the second was based on music by János Bihari.

== Leó Festetics ==
Original work	Liszt work	Forces	Date	S no.	Notes
Song "Spanisches Ständchen" (by 1844)	Transcription	piano	1846	S.487	
Les noces du Pâtre, mélodies hongroises, piano (1858)	Corrections and alterations to manuscript score	piano	1858	S.405a	

== John Field ==
Original work	Liszt work	Forces	Date	S no.	Notes
12 Nocturnes (piano)	Transcription	piano 4-hands	c. 1866	S.577a	

== Robert Franz ==
Original work	Liszt work	Forces	Date	S no.	Notes
Song "Er ist gekommen in Sturm und Regen", Op. 4/7 (1845)	Transcription	piano	1848	S.488	
12 Lieder from Opp. 2, 3 and 8	12 Lieder von Robert Franz (3 books)	piano	1849	S.489	Book I (1–5) is the 5 Schilflieder, Op. 2: "Auf geheimen Waldespfaden", "Drüben geht die Sonne scheiden", "Trübe wird's", "Sonnenuntergang", "Auf dem Teich".; Book II (6–8) contains: "Der Schalk", Op. 3/1, "Der Bote", Op. 8/1, and "Meerestille", Op. 8/2.; Book III (9–12) contains: "Treibt der Sommer seinen Rosen", Op. 8/5, "Gewitternacht", Op. 8/6, "Das ist ein Brausen und Heulen", Op. 8/4, and "Frühling und Liebe", Op. 3/3.

== Wenzel Robert von Gallenberg ==
Original work	Liszt work	Forces	Date	S no.	Notes
Die Amazonen, ballet (1823)	2 Waltzes: No. 2, Waltz aus dem Ballet Die Amazonen	violin and piano	1823–25	S.126b/2	
Die Amazonen, ballet (1823)	2 Waltzes: No. 2, Waltz aus dem Ballet Die Amazonen	piano	1823–25	S.208a/2	

== Manuel García ==
Original work	Liszt work	Forces	Date	S no.	Notes
Opera El poeta calculista (1805): Aria "Yo que soy contrabandista"	Rondeau fantastique sur un thème espagnol	piano	1836	S.252	

== Ludmilla Gizycka-Zámoyská ==
Original work	Liszt work	Forces	Date	S no.	Notes
Song "A Puszta Keserve" (Lenau)	Puszta-Wehmut	piano	1871	S.246	Gizycka-Zámoyská was born in 1829.
Song "A Puszta Keserve" (Lenau)	Puszta-Wehmut	violin and piano	1880	S.379b	Gizycka-Zámoyská was born in 1829.

== Mikhail Glinka ==
Original work	Liszt work	Forces	Date	S no.	Notes
Opera Ruslan and Lyudmila (1842): "Chernomor's March" (Act IV, No. 19)	Tscherkessenmarsch	piano	1843–75	S.406	
Opera Ruslan and Lyudmila (1842): "Chernomor's March" (Act IV, No. 19)	Tscherkessenmarsch	piano 4-hands	1875	S.629	

== Adalbert von Goldschmidt ==
Original work	Liszt work	Forces	Date	S no.	Notes
Cantata Die sieben Todsünden (1875): Liebesszene und Fortunas Kugel	Transcription	piano	1880	S.490	

== Charles Gounod ==
Original work	Liszt work	Forces	Date	S no.	Notes
Opera Faust (1859): Waltz and duet "O nuit d'amour" (Act II)	Valse de l'opéra Faust	piano	by 1861	S.407	
Soldiers' Chorus, "Gloire immortelle de nos aieux" (Act IV)	Transcription	piano	1864	S.743	Lost
Opera La reine de Saba (1862): Berceuse	Les Sabéennes. Berceuse de l'opéra La Reine de Saba	piano	pub. 1865	S.408	
Hymne à Sainte-Cécile (1865 version for violin solo, harps, timpani, wind instruments and double basses)	Transcription	piano	1866	S.491	
Opera Roméo et Juliette (1867)	Les Adieux. Reverie sur un motif de l'opéra Roméo et Juliette	piano	pub. 1868	S.409	

== Fromental Halévy ==
Original work	Liszt work	Forces	Date	S no.	Notes
Opera La Juive (1835)	Reminiscences de La Juive	piano	1835	S.409a	
Opera Le guitarréro (1841)	Fantaisie sur des thèmes de l'opéra Guitarero	piano	1841	S.743a	Lost

== George Frideric Handel ==
Original work	Liszt work	Forces	Date	S no.	Notes
Opera Almira, HWV 1 (1705)	"Sarabande and Chaconne from Handel's Almira"	piano	1879	S.181	

== Johann von Herbeck ==
Original work	Liszt work	Forces	Date	S no.	Notes
Tanz-Momente, Op. 14, orchestra (1868)	Transcription	piano	1869	S.492	A version for piano 4-hands was also published.

== Ferdinand Huber ==
Original work	Liszt work	Forces	Date	S no.	Notes
Receuil de Ranz des vaches (1830)	Album d'un voyageur: Book III, Paraphrases: No. 10, Improvisata sur le Ranz des vaches (Départ pour les Alpes; Aufzug auf die Alp)	piano	1835–36	S.156/10	Ferdinand Fürchtegott Huber (1791–1863). Revised as Ranz de vaches (Montée aux Alpes: Improvisata).
Ranz des chèvres (? 1830)	Album d'un voyageur: Book III, Paraphrases: No. 12, Rondeau sur le Ranz des chèvres	piano	1835–36	S.156/12	Re-issued as Ranz de chèvres de F. Huber (1837–38), and revised as Ranz de chèvres. Rondeau, No. 1 of 3 Morceaux suisses (1876–77).
Ranz des chèvres (? 1830)	3 Morceaux suisses: No. 1, Ranz de chèvres. Rondeau	piano	1876–77	S.156a/1	Re-issued as Ranz de chèvres de F. Huber (1837–38), and revised as Ranz de chèvres. Rondeau, No. 1 of 3 Morceaux suisses (1876–77).

== Johann Nepomuk Hummel ==
Original work	Liszt work	Forces	Date	S no.	Notes
Septet in D minor, Op. 74 (piano, flute, oboe, horn, viola, cello, double bass)	Edition	piano, flute, oboe, horn, viola, 2 cellos	?	-	Liszt transcribed the work for piano solo, in 2 versions. He also produced his own edition of the original work but provided an alternative scoring in which a second cello replaced the double bass.
Septet in D minor, Op. 74 (piano, flute, oboe, horn, viola, cello, double bass)	Transcription	piano	1848; c.1866	S.493	Liszt transcribed the work for piano solo, in 2 versions. He also produced his own edition of the original work but provided an alternative scoring in which a second cello replaced the double bass.

== Ernest Knop ==
Original work	Liszt work	Forces	Date	S no.	Notes
Air suisse varié, guitar (1830)	Album d'un voyageur: Book III, Paraphrases: No. 11, Nocturne sur le Chant Montagnard	piano	1835–36	S.156/11	Re-issued as Un soir dans la montagne. Mélodie d'Ernest Knop. Nocturne (1837–38); revised as Un soir dans les montagnes (Nocturne pastoral), No. 3 of 3 Morceaux suisses (1876–77).
Air suisse varié, guitar (1830)	3 Morceaux suisses: No. 3, Un soir dans les montagnes (Nocturne pastoral)	piano	1876–77	S.156a/3	Re-issued as Un soir dans la montagne. Mélodie d'Ernest Knop. Nocturne (1837–38); revised as Un soir dans les montagnes (Nocturne pastoral), No. 3 of 3 Morceaux suisses (1876–77).

== Francis Korbay ==
Original work	Liszt work	Forces	Date	S no.	Notes
Song "Le matin" (words by Georges Bizet)	2 Lieder von Francis Korbay	voice and orchestra	1883	S.368/1	Korbay was a godson of Liszt and a well-known performer of his music.
Song "Gebet" (words by Emanuel Geibel)	2 Lieder von Francis Korbay	voice and orchestra	1883	S.368/2	Korbay was a godson of Liszt and a well-known performer of his music.
Song "Gebet" (words by Emanuel Geibel)	"Gebet"	voice and organ	1883?	S.683a	Korbay was a godson of Liszt and a well-known performer of his music.

== Josef Krov ==
Original work	Liszt work	Forces	Date	S no.	Notes
Song "Těšme se blahou nadějć" (c. 1824)	Hussitenlied (from the 15th Century)	piano	1840	S.234	This drinking song by Josef Theodor Krov (1797–1859) to words by Václav Hanka was erroneously identified by the publisher as an early Hussite hymn. The tune was extensively quoted in Balfe's The Bohemian Girl as a patriotic song.
Song "Těšme se blahou nadějć" (c. 1824)	Hussitenlied (from the 15th Century)	piano 4‑hands	1840–41	S.620	This drinking song by Josef Theodor Krov (1797–1859) to words by Václav Hanka was erroneously identified by the publisher as an early Hussite hymn. The tune was extensively quoted in Balfe's The Bohemian Girl as a patriotic song.

== Charles Philippe Lafont ==
Original work	Liszt work	Forces	Date	S no.	Notes
Romance "Le départ du jeune marin"	Grand duo concertant sur la romance de M. Lafont "Le Marin"	violin and piano	1835–37	S.700h	
Romance "Le départ du jeune marin"	Grand duo concertant sur la romance de M. Lafont "Le Marin"	violin and piano	1849	S.128	Revised version

== Eduard Lassen ==
Original work	Liszt work	Forces	Date	S no.	Notes
6 Lieder von Peter Cornelius, Op. 5: No. 3, "Löse, Himmel, meine Seele"	Transcription	piano	1861–72	S.494	Liszt wrote 2 versions
No. 4, "Ich weil' in tiefer Einsamkeit"	Transcription	piano	1872	S.495	
Incidental music to Hebbel's Die Nibelungen, Op. 47 (1873)	Aus der Musik zu Hebbels Nibelungen und Goethes Faust: I. Nibelungen: 1. "Hagen und Kriemhild"; 2. "Bechlarn"; II. Faust: 1. "Osterhymne"; 2. "Hoffestlische Marsch und Polonaise"	piano	1878–79	S.496	
Incidental music to Goethe's Faust, Op. 57 (1876)	Aus der Musik zu Hebbels Nibelungen und Goethes Faust: I. Nibelungen: 1. "Hagen und Kriemhild"; 2. "Bechlarn"; II. Faust: 1. "Osterhymne"; 2. "Hoffestlische Marsch und Polonaise"	piano	1878–79	S.496	
Incidental music to Calderón's Über allen Zauber Liebe, Op. 73 (1883): Intermezzo	Symphonisches Zwischenspiel	piano	c. 1882	S.497	Calderón's 1635 play is known in Spanish as El mayor encanto, amor, and in English as Love, the Greatest Enchantment.

== Orlande de Lassus ==
Original work	Liszt work	Forces	Date	S no.	Notes
Regina coeli laetare, motet for unaccompanied voices (1604)	Transcription	organ	1865	S.663	

== Otto Lessmann ==
Original work	Liszt work	Forces	Date	S no.	Notes
3 Songs from J. Wolff's Tannhäuser, Op. 27 (1881): "Der Lenz ist gekommen"; "Trinklied"; "Du schaust mich an"	Transcription	piano	c.1882	S.498	Otto Lessmann (1844–1918)

== Prince Louis Ferdinand of Prussia ==
Original work	Liszt work	Forces	Date	S no.	Notes
?	Élégie sur des motifs du Prince Louis Ferdinand de Prusse	piano	1842	S.168	Prince Louis Ferdinand was an amateur composer whose musical gifts were nevertheless held in high esteem by other composers such as Beethoven, who dedicated his Piano Concerto No. 3 in C minor to the Prince.

== Sir Alexander Mackenzie ==
Original work	Liszt work	Forces	Date	S no.	Notes
Opera The Troubador, Op. 33 (1886)	Transcription	piano	1886	-	This was planned but Liszt never went past the sketching stage.

== Grand Duchess Maria Pavlovna of Russia ==
Original work	Liszt work	Forces	Date	S no.	Notes
Song "Es hat geflammt die ganze Nacht"	Arrangement	voice and piano	1849–54	S.685	
Theme	6 Consolations: No. 4, Quasi adagio	piano	1849–50	S.172/4	

== Jules Massenet ==
Original work	Liszt work	Forces	Date	S no.	Notes
Marche hongroise de Szabady, orchestra, 1879	Revive Szegedin: Marche hongroise	piano	1879	S.572	Massenet based his work on Marche turque-hongroise by Frank Ignac Szabadi (1825–79); Liszt's transcription was inscribed Revive Szegedin: Marche hongroise transcrite d'après l'orchestration de J. Massenet

== Felix Mendelssohn ==
Original work	Liszt work	Forces	Date	S no.	Notes
Songs Without Words: Book I, Op. 19b: Nos. 1–3	Grosses Konzertstück über Mendelssohns Lieder ohne Worte	2 pianos	1834	S.257	Liszt and a student, Mlle. Vial, started to perform it in Paris on 9 April 1835 but Liszt became ill. Ferruccio Busoni, who considered Mendelssohn a composer of genius, died before fulfilling his plan to play it with Egon Petri in London. It was first performed in full by Richard and John Contiguglia at the 1984 Holland Liszt Festival in Utrecht.
6 Songs, Op. 19a (1830–34): 2 songs	Mendelssohn Lieder: "Auf Flügeln des Gesanges", Op. 34/2; "Sonntagslied", Op. 34/5; "Reiselied", Op. 34/6; "Neue Liebe", Op. 19a/4; "Frühlingslied", Op. 47/3; "Winterlied", Op. 19a/3; "Suleika", Op. 34/4	piano	1840	S.547	
6 Songs, Op. 34 (1834–37): 4 songs	Mendelssohn Lieder: "Auf Flügeln des Gesanges", Op. 34/2; "Sonntagslied", Op. 34/5; "Reiselied", Op. 34/6; "Neue Liebe", Op. 19a/4; "Frühlingslied", Op. 47/3; "Winterlied", Op. 19a/3; "Suleika", Op. 34/4	piano	1840	S.547	
6 Songs, Op. 47 (1839): 1 song	Mendelssohn Lieder: "Auf Flügeln des Gesanges", Op. 34/2; "Sonntagslied", Op. 34/5; "Reiselied", Op. 34/6; "Neue Liebe", Op. 19a/4; "Frühlingslied", Op. 47/3; "Winterlied", Op. 19a/3; "Suleika", Op. 34/4	piano	1840	S.547	
6 Songs for male chorus, Op. 50 (1837–40): 2 songs	"Wasserfahrt", Op. 50/4; "Der Jäger Abschied", Op. 50/2	piano	1848	S.548	
A Midsummer Night's Dream, incidental music, Op. 61 (1842)	Wedding March and Dance of the Elves	piano	1849–50	S.410	

== Saverio Mercadante ==
Original work	Liszt work	Forces	Date	S no.	Notes
Opera Il giuramento (1837)	Réminiscences de La Scala	piano	1837‑38	S.458	This work uses three themes from Il giuramento and a fourth theme that is as yet unidentified. The piece also appeared as Fantasia on Italian Operatic Melodies. It was listed in the Searle catalogue as "Piano piece on Italian operatic melodies", the writers of which were listed as "unknown".
Soirées italiennes, 8 ariettas and 4 duos: No. 2, "La primavera: Canzonetta"; No. 10, "Il galop"; No. 4, "Il pastore svizzero: Tirolese"; No. 5, "La serenata del marinaro"; No. 11, "Il Brindisi: Rondoletto"; No. 8, "La zingarella spagnola: Bolero"	Soirées italiennes: Six amusements sur des motifs de Mercadante	piano	1838	S.411	Dedicated to Archduchess Elizabeth of Austria.

== Giacomo Meyerbeer ==
Original work	Liszt work	Forces	Date	S no.	Notes
Opera Robert le diable (1831)	Reminiscences de Robert le Diable. Valse infernale	piano	1841	S.413	
Opera Robert le diable (1831)	Reminiscences de Robert le Diable. Valse infernale	piano 4-hands	1841–43	S.630	
Opera Les Huguenots (1836)	Grande Fantaisie sur des thèmes de l'opéra Les Huguenots	piano	1836	S.412	Dedicated to Marie d'Agoult
Song "Le Moine" ("Die Mönch") (1841)	"Le Moine"	piano	1841	S.416	Incorporates two other themes by Meyerbeer.
Opera Le prophète (1849)	Illustrations du Prophète	piano	1849–50	S.414	The 3 Illustrations of S.414 are: 1. Prière, hymne triomphale, marche du sacre; 2. Les Patineurs, scherzo; 3. Choeur pastoral, appel aux armes. The Fantasy and Fugue is sometimes listed as No. 4 in the series
Opera Le prophète (1849)	Fantasie und Fuge über den Choral "Ad nos, ad salutarem undam"	organ	1849–50	S.259	The 3 Illustrations of S.414 are: 1. Prière, hymne triomphale, marche du sacre; 2. Les Patineurs, scherzo; 3. Choeur pastoral, appel aux armes. The Fantasy and Fugue is sometimes listed as No. 4 in the series
Opera Le prophète (1849)	Fantasie und Fuge über den Choral "Ad nos, ad salutarem undam"	piano 4‑hands or pedal piano	1849–50	S.624	The 3 Illustrations of S.414 are: 1. Prière, hymne triomphale, marche du sacre; 2. Les Patineurs, scherzo; 3. Choeur pastoral, appel aux armes. The Fantasy and Fugue is sometimes listed as No. 4 in the series
Festmarsch zu Schillers 100-jähriger Geburtsfeier (1859)	Transcription	piano	1860	S.549	
Opera L'Africaine (1864): Sailors' Prayer "O grand Saint Dominique" (Act III); Indian March (Act IV)	Illustrations de l'Africaine	piano	1865	S.415	The two Illustrations are: 1. Prière des matelots; 2. Marche indienne.

== Mihály Mosonyi ==
Original work	Liszt work	Forces	Date	S no.	Notes
Opera Szép Ilonka (1861)	Fantaisie sur l'opéra hongrois Szép Ilonka	piano	1867	S.417	Dedicated to Mosonyi
Funeral Music for István Széchenyi, piano (1860)	Historische ungarische Bildnisse: No. 4, "Ladislaus Teleki / Teleki László"	piano	1885	S.205	Uses basso ostinato.
Funeral Music for István Széchenyi, piano (1860)	Trauervorspiel und Trauermarsch: No. 2, Marcia funebre	piano	1885	S.206	Uses main theme.

== Wolfgang Amadeus Mozart ==
Original work	Liszt work	Forces	Date	S no.	Notes
Opera The Marriage of Figaro, K.492 (1786)	Fantasy on Themes from Mozart's Figaro and Don Giovanni	piano	1842	S.697	Performed Berlin 11 January 1843; edited and completed by Ferruccio Busoni
Opera Don Giovanni, K.527 (1787)	Fantasy on Themes from Mozart's Figaro and Don Giovanni	piano	1842	S.697	Performed Berlin 11 January 1843; edited and completed by Ferruccio Busoni
Opera Don Giovanni, K.527 (1787)	Réminiscences de Don Juan	piano	1841	S.418	Dedicated to King Christian VIII of Denmark
Opera Don Giovanni, K.527 (1787)	Réminiscences de Don Juan	2 pianos	after 1841	S.656	Dedicated to King Christian VIII of Denmark
Motet Ave verum corpus, K.618 (1791)	À la chapelle Sixtine (organ version: Evocation à la Chapelle Sixtine)	piano	1862	S.461	This piece combines Allegri's Miserere (1630s) with Mozart's Ave verum corpus. (Mozart was deeply involved in the circumstances that led to the first publication of the Miserere: He heard it in the Sistine Chapel when visiting Rome at the age of 15, and famously wrote it down from memory, although publishing the work or even writing it down was prohibited on pain of excommunication. Rather than imposing this penalty, the Pope later congratulated him on his genius). À la chapelle Sixtine was the basis of the third movement (Preghiera) of Tchaikovsky's "Mozartiana" (Orchestral Suite No. 4), but he used only the Ave verum corpus component.
Motet Ave verum corpus, K.618 (1791)	À la chapelle Sixtine (organ version: Evocation à la Chapelle Sixtine)	organ	c. 1862	S.658	
Motet Ave verum corpus, K.618 (1791)	À la chapelle Sixtine (organ version: Evocation à la Chapelle Sixtine)	piano 4‑hands	c. 1865	S.633	
Motet Ave verum corpus, K.618 (1791)	À la chapelle Sixtine (organ version: Evocation à la Chapelle Sixtine)	orchestra	?	S.360	
Opera The Magic Flute, K.620 (1791): Overture	Transcription	piano	?	S.748	This was part of Liszt's performing repertoire but is now lost.
"Der, welcher wandert diese Straße voll Beschwerden" (Act II)	Adagio von Die Zauberflöte	piano 4-hands	1875–81	S.634a	
Requiem in D minor, K.626 (1791): "Confutatis" and "Lacrymosa"	Transcription	piano	pub. 1865	S.550	

== Otto Nicolai ==
Original work	Liszt work	Forces	Date	S no.	Notes
Ecclesiastical Festival Overture on the chorale "Ein feste Burg ist unser Gott", Op. 31	Transcription	organ	1852	S.675	

== Giovanni Pacini ==
Original work	Liszt work	Forces	Date	S no.	Notes
Opera Niobe (1826)	Divertissement sur le cavatine "I tuoi frequenti palpiti"	piano	1835–36	S.419	

== Niccolò Paganini ==
Original work	Liszt work	Forces	Date	S no.	Notes
24 Caprices for Solo Violin, Op. 1 (1802–17)	Études d'exécution transcendante d'après Paganini (S.140): revised as Grandes études de Paganini (S.141)	piano	1838–51	S.140, 141	Paganini's Caprices Nos. 1, 6, 9, 17 and 24 were the basis of Nos. 4, 1, 5, 2 and 6 respectively of Liszt's Études d'exécution transcendante d'après Paganini (S.140). La campanella became Étude No. 3. The set of 6 Études were revised as Grandes études de Paganini (S.141). La campanella had earlier been the basis of a separate work, the Grande Fantaisie de bravoure (S.420).
Violin Concerto No. 2 in B minor, Op. 7 (1826): III. La campanella	Études d'exécution transcendante d'après Paganini (S.140): revised as Grandes études de Paganini (S.141)	piano	1838–51	S.140, 141	Paganini's Caprices Nos. 1, 6, 9, 17 and 24 were the basis of Nos. 4, 1, 5, 2 and 6 respectively of Liszt's Études d'exécution transcendante d'après Paganini (S.140). La campanella became Étude No. 3. The set of 6 Études were revised as Grandes études de Paganini (S.141). La campanella had earlier been the basis of a separate work, the Grande Fantaisie de bravoure (S.420).
Violin Concerto No. 2 in B minor, Op. 7 (1826): III. La campanella	Grande Fantaisie de bravoure sur la Clochette	piano	1831–32	S.420	Paganini's Caprices Nos. 1, 6, 9, 17 and 24 were the basis of Nos. 4, 1, 5, 2 and 6 respectively of Liszt's Études d'exécution transcendante d'après Paganini (S.140). La campanella became Étude No. 3. The set of 6 Études were revised as Grandes études de Paganini (S.141). La campanella had earlier been the basis of a separate work, the Grande Fantaisie de bravoure (S.420).
Il carnevale di Venezia, violin and orchestra, Op. 10 (1829)	Variations sur le Carnaval de Venise	piano	1843	S.700a	
Il carnevale di Venezia, violin and orchestra, Op. 10 (1829)	Grande Fantaisie sur des thèmes de Paganini (S.700/1): revised as Variations de bravoure sur des thèmes de Paganini (S.700/2)	piano	1845	S.700	

== Luigi Pantaleoni ==
Original work	Liszt work	Forces	Date	S no.	Notes
Barcarole vénitienne, song for solo voice (1840?)	Arrangement	voice and piano	1840	S.684	Died 1872. Father of Romilda Pantaleoni.

== Giovanni Battista Perucchini ==
Original work	Liszt work	Forces	Date	S no.	Notes
Song "La Biondina in Gondoletta"	Venezia e Napoli (1st version): No. 3, Andante placido	piano	1840	S.159/3	S.162 is a revision of S.159. Dates: 1784–1870.
Song "La Biondina in Gondoletta"	Années de pèlerinage, Deuxième Année: Italie. Supplement: Venezia e Napoli: No. 1, Gondoliera	piano	1859	S.162/1	S.162 is a revision of S.159. Dates: 1784–1870.

== F. Pezzini ==
Original work	Liszt work	Forces	Date	S no.	Notes
"Una stella amica"	Transcription	piano	1874‑75	S.551	Pezzini was a local band master at the Villa d'Este, but no further details about him are known. "Una stella amica" is variously described as a waltz or a mazurka.

== Joachim Raff ==
Original work	Liszt work	Forces	Date	S no.	Notes
Opera König Alfred (1851): Andante finale and March	Transcription	piano	1853	S.421	Dedicated to Karl Klindworth
Opera König Alfred (1851): Andante finale and March	Transcription	piano 4-hands	1853	S.631	Dedicated to Karl Klindworth
Tanz-Capricen, Op. 54, 3 pieces for piano (1852): No. 1, Waltz in D♭ major	New introduction and coda	piano	1854	S.551a	

== Alexander Ritter ==
Original work	Liszt work	Forces	Date	S no.	Notes
5 Charakterstücke, Op. 3, violin and organ (1873): No. 1, In der Christmette	Revised and corrected	violin and organ	1873?	S.675a	

== Salvator Rosa (attrib.) ==
Original work	Liszt work	Notes
Canzonetta "Vado ben spesso cangiando loco"	See Années de pèlerinage, Deuxième année: Italie at Giovanni Battista Bononcini above	This song, among many others, was long attributed to Salvator Rosa, but was in fact written by Bononcini.

== Gioachino Rossini ==
Original work	Liszt work	Forces	Date	S no.	Notes
Opera Otello (1816): Gondolier's song "Nessun maggior dolore" (Act III)	Années de pèlerinage, Deuxième Année: Italie. Supplement: Venezia e Napoli: No. 2, Canzone	piano	1859	S.162/2	
Operas Armida (1817) and La donna del lago (1819)	Impromptu brilliant sur des thèmes de Rossini et Spontini	piano	1824	S.150	Also includes themes from operas by Gaspare Spontini
Opera Ermione	Sept variations brillantes sur un thème de G. Rossini	piano	1824	S.149	
Opera Mosè in Egitto (1818)	Fantaisie sur des thèmes de 'Maometto' et 'Mose'	piano	?	S.751	Lost
Opera Le siège de Corinthe (1826)	Introduction des variations sur une marche du Siège de Corinthe	piano	1830	S.750; renumbered as 421a	Lost Only the Introduction survives; there is no trace of the Variations on a March from Le Siège de Corinthe
Opera William Tell (1829): William Tell Overture	Transcription	piano	1838	S.552	
Les Soirées musicales, 8 ariettas and 4 duets (1835)	La Serenata e l'Orgia. Grande Fantaisie sur des motifs des Soirées musicales	piano	1835‑36	S.422	Nos. 10 and 11; also includes a theme from La promessa (No. 1)
Les Soirées musicales, 8 ariettas and 4 duets (1835)	La pastorella dell'Alpi e Li marinari. 2me Fantaisie sur des motifs des Soirées musicales	piano	1835‑36	S.423	Nos. 6 and 12; also includes a theme from La regata veneziana (No. 2)
Les Soirées musicales, 8 ariettas and 4 duets (1835)	Soirées musicales	piano	1837	S.424	The 12 numbers are: 1. La promessa; 2. La regata veneziana; 3. L'invito; 4. La gita in gondola; 5. Il rimprovero; 6. La pastorella dell'Alpi; 7. La partenza; 8. La pesca; 9. La danza; 10. La serenata; 11. L'orgia; 12. Li marinari
Stabat Mater (1841): No. 2, "Cujus animam"	Transcription	organ/trombone	1860s	S.679	Also used in S.553
Stabat Mater (1841): No. 2, "Cujus animam"	Transcription	tenor/organ	pub. 1874	S.682	Also used in S.553
Stabat Mater (1841): No. 2, "Cujus animam"	Deux Transcriptions d'après Rossini: No. 1, "Cujus animam"; No. 2, "La Charité"	piano	1847	S.553	
3 Choeurs religieux, female chorus and piano (1844): No. 3, "La Charité"	Deux Transcriptions d'après Rossini: No. 1, "Cujus animam"; No. 2, "La Charité"	piano	1847	S.553	

== Claude Joseph Rouget de Lisle ==
Original work	Liszt work	Forces	Date	S no.	Notes
Song "La Marseillaise" (1792)	"La Marseillaise"	piano	1872	S.237	

== Jean-Jacques Rousseau ==
Original work	Liszt work	Forces	Date	S no.	Notes
Opera Le devin du village (1752)	Transcription	piano	1883	-	This was planned but never executed.

== Anton Rubinstein ==
Original work	Liszt work	Forces	Date	S no.	Notes
6 Lieder von Heine, Op. 32 (1856): No. 6, "Der Asra"	Transcription	piano	1883?	S.554	
12 Lieder des Mirza-Schaffy, Op. 34 (1854): No. 9, "Gelb rollt mir zu Füßen"	Transcription	piano	1881	S.554	
12 Lieder des Mirza-Schaffy, Op. 34 (1854): No. 9, "Gelb rollt mir zu Füßen"	Transcription	piano	?	S.752	Lost
Étude on False Notes (piano; 1867)	Revised as Étude sur des notes fausses	piano	1880?	S.554a	

== Camille Saint-Saëns ==
Original work	Liszt work	Forces	Date	S no.	Notes
Danse macabre, symphonic poem, Op. 40 (1874)	Transcription	piano	1876	S.555	Dedicated to Sophie Menter.

== Franz Schubert ==
Original work	D no.	Op.	Liszt work	Forces	Date	S no.	Notes
"Gretchen am Spinnrade" (1814)	D.118	Op. 2	6 Songs	voice and orchestra	1860	S.375/2	
"Gretchen am Spinnrade" (1814)	D.118	Op. 2	12 Lieder von Franz Schubert	piano	1838, rev. 1876	S.558/8	
"Rastlose Liebe" (1815)	D.138	Op. 5/1	12 Lieder von Franz Schubert	piano	1838	S.558/10	
Walzer, Ländler und Ecossaisen, piano	D.145		Soirées de Vienne: 9 Valses caprices d'après Schubert	piano	1852	S.427/2, 3	Used in Nos. 2 and 3
"Des Mädchens Klage" (2nd version; 1815)	D.191	Op. 58/3	No. 2 of Sechs Melodien von Franz Schubert	piano	1844	S.563/2	
"Meeres Stille" (1815)	D.216	Op. 3/2	Transcription	piano	1837	S.557b	1st version
"Meeres Stille" (1815)	D.216	Op. 3/2	12 Lieder von Franz Schubert	piano	1838	S.558/5	
"Erlkönig" (1815–21)	D.328	Op. 1	6 Songs	voice and orchestra	1860	S.375/4	
"Erlkönig" (1815–21)	D.328	Op. 1	Transcription	piano	1837	S.557a	1st version
"Erlkönig" (1815–21)	D.328	Op. 1	12 Lieder von Franz Schubert	piano	1838, rev. 1876	S.558/4	
"Litanei (Auf das Fest Aller Seelen)" (1816)	D.343		Transcription: Franz Schuberts geistliche Lieder	piano	1840	S.562/1	
Originaltänze, piano	D.365	Op. 9	Apparitions: III. Fantaisie sur une valse de François Schubert (Molto agitato ed appassionato)	piano	1834	S.155/3	Waltz No. 33 in F major; the same waltz appeared in Soirées de Vienne, S.427
Originaltänze, piano	D.365	Op. 9	Soirées de Vienne: 9 Valses caprices d'après Schubert	piano	1852	S.427	Used in Nos. 1–5 and 9
"Die gestirne" (1816)	D.444		Transcription: Franz Schuberts geistliche Lieder	piano	1840	S.562/3	
"Der Wanderer" (1816)	D.493	Op. 4/1	12 Lieder von Franz Schubert	piano	1838, rev. 1876	S.558/11	
"Die Forelle" (1817)	D.550		No. 6 of Sechs Melodien von Franz Schubert	piano	1844	S.563/6	
"Die Forelle" (1817)	D.550		Transcription (2nd version)	piano	1846	S.564	
"Himmelsfunken" (1819)	D.651		Transcription: Franz Schuberts geistliche Lieder	piano	1840	S.562/2	
"Frühlingsglaube"	D.686	Op. 20/2	Transcription	piano	1837	S.557c	1st version
"Frühlingsglaube"	D.686	Op. 20/2	12 Lieder von Franz Schubert	piano	1838, rev. 1876	S.558/7	
"Lob der Tränen"	D.711	Op. 13/2	Transcription	piano	1838	S.557	
Opera Alfonso und Estrella (1822): Act I	D.732		Transcription	piano	?	S.753	Liszt conducted the world premiere performance in Weimar, 24 June 1854; he had published an essay on the opera in advance of the first performance, and also had made cuts to the score for the production. The score of the transcription is lost.
Wiener Damen-Ländler, piano	D.734		Soirées de Vienne: 9 Valses caprices d'après Schubert	piano	1852	S.427/1	Used in No. 1
"Sei mir gegrüsst!" (1822)	D.741	Op. 20/1	12 Lieder von Franz Schubert	piano	1838	S.558/1	
"Die Rose" (? 1820)	D.745	Op. 73	Transcription	piano	1835	S.556	
Wanderer Fantasy in C, piano (1822)	D.760	Op. 15		piano and orchestra	by 1851	S.366	FP of orch. version Vienna, 14 December 1851, J. Egghard (piano), Hellmesberger (conductor)
Wanderer Fantasy in C, piano (1822)	D.760	Op. 15		2 pianos	by 1851	S.653	FP of orch. version Vienna, 14 December 1851, J. Egghard (piano), Hellmesberger (conductor)
"Auf dem Wasser zu singen" (1823)	D.774	Op. 72	12 Lieder von Franz Schubert	piano	1838	S.558/2	
"Du bist die Ruh" (1823)	D.776	Op. 59/3	12 Lieder von Franz Schubert	piano	1838, rev. 1876	S.558/3	
Valses sentimentales, piano	D.779		Soirées de Vienne: 9 Valses caprices d'après Schubert	piano	1852	S.427/6	Used in No. 6
18 Deutsche und Ecossaisen, piano	D.783		Soirées de Vienne: 9 Valses caprices d'après Schubert	piano	1852	S.427	Used in Nos. 1, 3, 7 and 8
Song cycle Die schöne Müllerin (1823):	D.795	Op. 25		piano			
No. 1, "Das Wandern"	D.795	Op. 25	No. 1 of Müllerlieder	piano	1846	S.565/1	
No. 2, "Wohin?"	D.795	Op. 25	No. 5 of Müllerlieder	piano	1846	S.565/5	
No. 7, "Ungeduld"	D.795	Op. 25	No. 5 of Sechs Melodien von Franz Schubert	piano	1846	S.563/5	
No. 7, "Ungeduld"	D.795	Op. 25	No. 6 of Müllerlieder	piano	1846	S.565/6	
No. 14, "Der Jäger"	D.795	Op. 25	No. 3 of Müllerlieder	piano	1846	S.565/3	
No. 17, "Die böse Farbe"	D.795	Op. 25	No. 4 of Müllerlieder	piano	1846	S.565/4	
No. 18, "Trockne Blumen"	D.795	Op. 25	No. 4 of Sechs Melodien von Franz Schubert	piano	1846	S.563/4	
No. 19, "Der Müller und der Bach"	D.795	Op. 25	No. 2 of Müllerlieder	piano	1846	S.565/2	
Rosamunde incidental music (1823)	D.797		Transcription: Franz Schuberts geistliche Lieder	piano	1840	S.562/4	Liszt transcribed part of No. 4 Geisterchor as "Hymne"
"Die Gondelfahrer", male chorus and piano (1824)	D.809	Op. 28	Transcription	piano	1838	S.559	
Divertissement à la hongroise, piano duet (1824)	D.818	Op. 54	Mélodies hongroises (d'après Schubert)	piano	1838–39	S.425	1. Andante; 2. Marcia; 3. Allegretto
Divertissement à la hongroise, piano duet (1824)	D.818	Op. 54	II. Ungarischer Marsch in C minor used in 4 Marches	piano	orchestra	1859–60	S.363/4
Divertissement à la hongroise, piano duet (1824)	D.818	Op. 54	II. Ungarischer Marsch in C minor used in 4 Marches	piano 4-hands	after 1860	S.632/4	
Six Grand Marches and Trios, piano duet (1824)	D.819	Op. 40	Schubert's Märsche für das Pianoforte Solo	piano	1846	S.426/1–2	March in B minor D.819/3 was S.426/2; Trauermarsch in E♭ minor, D.819/5 was S.426/1
Six Grand Marches and Trios, piano duet (1824)	D.819	Op. 40	Two marches used in 4 Marches	orchestra	1859–60	S.363/1–2	March in B minor D.819/3 was S.363/1; Trauermarsch in E♭ minor, D.819/5 was S.363/2
Six Grand Marches and Trios, piano duet (1824)	D.819	Op. 40	Two marches used in 4 Marches	piano 4-hands	after 1860	S.632/1–2	March in B minor D.819/3 was S.363/1; Trauermarsch in E♭ minor, D.819/5 was S.363/2
"Die Junge Nonne" (1825)	D.828	Op. 43/1	6 Songs	voice and orchestra	1860	S.375/1	
"Die Junge Nonne" (1825)	D.828	Op. 43/1	12 Lieder von Franz Schubert	piano	1838	S.558/6	
"Ave Maria" (1825)	D.839		Transcription	piano	1837	S.557d	1st version
"Ave Maria" (1825)	D.839		12 Lieder von Franz Schubert	piano	1838	S.558/12	
"Die Allmacht" (1825)	D.852	Op. 79/2	"Die Allmacht"	T or S solo, male chorus & orchestra	1871	S.376	
"Das Zügenglöcklein" (aka "Das Sterbeglöcklein"; 1826)	D.871		No. 3 of Sechs Melodien von Franz Schubert	piano	1844	S.563/3	
"Lied der Mignon" (1826)	D.877/2	Op. 62/2	6 Songs	voice and orchestra	1860	S.375/3	
"Ständchen (Horch! Horch! die Lerch!)" (1826)	D.889		12 Lieder von Franz Schubert	piano	1838, rev. 1876	S.558/9	
Winterreise, song cycle (1827)	D.911	Op. 89	Transcription of 12 songs	piano	1840	S.561	Liszt chose 12 of the 24 songs, and rearranged their order: 1. "Gute Nacht" (S.561/1); 4. "Erstarrung" (S.561/5); 5. "Der Lindenbaum" (S.561/7); 6. "Wasserflut" (S.561/6); 13. "Die Post" (S.561/4); 17. "Im Dorfe" (S.561/12); 18. "Der stürmische Morgen" (S.561/11); 19. "Täuschung" (S.561/9); 21. "Das Wirtshaus" (S.561/10); 22. "Mut!" (S.561/3); 23. "Die Nebensonnen" (S.561/2); and 24. "Der Leiermann" (S.561/8).
Symphony No. 9 in C major (1826)	D.944		Projected transcription	piano	–	–	This was planned but never executed.
Schwanengesang, 14 lieder (1828)	D.957		Transcription	piano	1838–39	S.560	Liszt rearranged the order of the songs: 1. Liebesbotschaft (S.560/10); 2. "Kriegers Ahnung" (S.560/14); 3. "Frühlingssehnsucht" (S.560/9); 4. "Ständchen" (S.560/7); 5. "Aufenthalt" (S.560/3); 6. "In der Ferne" (S.560/6); 7. "Abschied" (S.560/5); 8. "Der Atlas" (S.560/11); 9. "Ihr Bild" (S.560/8); 10. "Das Fischermädchen" (S.560/2); 11. "Die Stadt" (S.560/1); 12. "Am Meer" (S.560/4); 13. "Der Doppelgänger" (S.560/12); and 14. "Die Taubenpost" (S.560/13).
No. 7, "Abschied"	D.957		6 Songs	voice and orchestra	1860	S.375/6	
No. 13, "Der Doppelgänger"	D.957		6 Songs	voice and orchestra	1860	S.375/5	
Reitermarsch, No. 1 of 2 Marches caractéristiques, piano duet (? 1826)	D.968b	Op. 121	Schubert's Märsche für das Pianoforte Solo	piano	1846	S.426/4	D.968b was formerly D.886
Reitermarsch, No. 1 of 2 Marches caractéristiques, piano duet (? 1826)	D.968b	Op. 121	Used in 4 Marches	orchestra	1859–60	S.363/3	
Reitermarsch, No. 1 of 2 Marches caractéristiques, piano duet (? 1826)	D.968b	Op. 121	Used in 4 Marches	piano 4-hands	after 1860	S.632/3	
12 Valses nobles	D.969		Soirées de Vienne: 9 Valses caprices d'après Schubert	piano	1852	S.427	Used in Nos. 5, 6 and 8

== Clara Schumann ==
Original work	Liszt work	Forces	Date	S no.	Notes
Gedichte aus Rückerts Liebesfrühling, Op. 12 (1841): No. 3, "Warum willst du and're fragen"	Lieder von Robert und Clara Schumann: Book B (Clara)	piano	1874	S.569/8–10	The set of 10 transcriptions also includes 7 songs by Robert Schumann.
6 Lieder, Op. 13 (1842–44): No. 5, "Ich hab' in deinem Auge"	Lieder von Robert und Clara Schumann: Book B (Clara)	piano	1874	S.569/8–10	The set of 10 transcriptions also includes 7 songs by Robert Schumann.
6 Lieder aus Jucunde von Rollet, Op. 23 (1853): No. 10, "Geheimes Flüstern"	Lieder von Robert und Clara Schumann: Book B (Clara)	piano	1874	S.569/8–10	The set of 10 transcriptions also includes 7 songs by Robert Schumann.

== Robert Schumann ==
Original work	Liszt work	Forces	Date	S no.	Notes
Myrthen, Op. 25 (1840): No. 1, "Widmung"	"Liebeslied"	piano	1848	S.566	
Lieder und Gesänge, Vol. I, Op. 27 (1840): No. 2, "Dem roten Röslein gleicht mein Lieb"	"Rotes Röslein", No. 2 of 2 Lieder von Robert Schumann	piano	1861	S.567/2	
6 Gedichte, Op. 36 (1840): No. 4, "An den Sonnenschein"	No. 1 of 2 Lieder von Robert Schumann	piano	1861	S.567/1	
Liederkreis, Op. 39 (1840): No. 12, "Frühlingsnacht"	Transcription	piano	1872	S.568	
Liederalbum für die Jugend, 28 songs, Op. 79 (1849): No. 16, "Weihnachtslied"; No. 17, "Die wandelnde Glocke"; No. 19, "Frühlings Ankunft"; No. 22, "Des Sennen Abschied"; No. 23, "Er ist's"	Lieder von Robert und Clara Schumann: Book A (Robert)	piano	1874	S.569/1–7	Nos. 1–5 were from Op. 79, and Nos. 6–7 were from Op. 98a. The set of 10 transcriptions also includes 3 songs by Clara Schumann.
Lieder und Gesänge aus 'Wilhelm Meister', 9 songs, Op. 98a (1849): No. 3, "Nur wer die Sehnsucht kennt"; No. 5, "An die Türen will ich schleichen"	Lieder von Robert und Clara Schumann: Book A (Robert)	piano	1874	S.569/1–7	Nos. 1–5 were from Op. 79, and Nos. 6–7 were from Op. 98a. The set of 10 transcriptions also includes 3 songs by Clara Schumann.
Des Sängers Fluch, 14 songs, Op. 139 (1852): No. 4, "Provenzalisches Minnelied"	Transcription	piano	1881	S.570	

== Bedřich Smetana ==
Original work	Liszt work	Forces	Date	S no.	Notes
3 Polkas de salon, Op. 7, piano (1848–54): No. 1 in F	New introduction and coda	piano	1885	S.570a	

== Mariano Soriano ==
Original work	Liszt work	Forces	Date	S no.	Notes
?	Feuille morte: Élégie d'après Sorriano [sic]	piano	c. 1845	S.428	Mariano Soriano Fuertes y Piqueras (28 March 1817 - 26 March 1880); Soriano's surname was misspelled as "Sorriano" on the title page. There is no information about the source of this piece or how Liszt came to know it, but it is speculated it may have been a melody from a zarzuela, as it is known Liszt was in Córdoba in 1844. The title Feuille morte is probably Liszt's own.

== Louis Spohr ==
Original work	Liszt work	Forces	Date	S no.	Notes
Opera Zemire et Azor (1819): Zemire's romance "Rose wie bist du reizend und mild!" (Act I, No. 8)	"Die Rose", Romanze	piano	1876	S.571	

== Gaspare Spontini ==
Original work	Liszt work	Forces	Date	S no.	Notes
Opera Fernand Cortez (1809–32)	Impromptu brilliant sur des thèmes de Rossini et Spontini	piano	1824	S.150	Also includes themes from operas by Gioachino Rossini
Opera Olimpie (1819–26)	Impromptu brilliant sur des thèmes de Rossini et Spontini	piano	1824	S.150	Also includes themes from operas by Gioachino Rossini

== Imre Széchényi ==
Original work	Liszt work	Forces	Date	S no.	Notes
Ungarischer Marsch (? 1872)	Einleitung und Ungarischer Marsch (Bevezetés és magyar indulò)	piano	1872	S.572	Imre graf von Széchényi 1825–1898

== Karl Tausig ==
Original work	Liszt work	Forces	Date	S no.	Notes
Valse-Caprice No. 3, piano (1862)	Revised with additions	piano	1883–85	S.571a	(S.571a was formerly S.167a.); Tausig's Valse-Caprice No. 3 was based on Johann Strauss II's Wahlstimmen, Op. 250.

== Pyotr Ilyich Tchaikovsky ==
Original work	Liszt work	Forces	Date	S no.	Notes
Opera Eugene Onegin, Op. 24 (1879): Polonaise from Act III	Transcription	piano	1880	S.429	Dedicated to Karl Klindworth

== Pier Adolfo Tirindelli ==
Original work	Liszt work	Forces	Date	S no.	Notes
Mazurka No. 2	Variations	piano	1880	S.754	Probably not by Liszt.

== János Végh ==
Original work	Liszt work	Forces	Date	S no.	Notes
Suite en forme de valse (piano 4-hands; 1882)	Valse de concert d'après la "Suite en forme de valse"	piano	pub. 1889	S.430	János Végh von Vereb (1845–1918) was a close friend of Liszt. He studied with Károly Thern and Mihály Mosonyi but decided to pursue a judicial career while continuing his involvement in music as an amateur. With Liszt's approval he transcribed for 2 pianos 8‑hands several of Liszt's works, such as the Dante Symphony, and the Grand Galop Chromatique. In 1879 Liszt dedicated to Végh his symphonic poem Hunnenschlacht and his transcription for piano 4-hands of that work as well as Hamlet, Die Ideale, and Zwei Episoden aus Lenaus Faust. In 1881 Végh became vice-president of the Budapest Academy of Music, Liszt being the president.

== Giuseppe Verdi ==
Original work	Liszt work	Forces	Date	S no.	Notes
Opera I Lombardi (1843)	Salve Maria de Jérusalem	piano	1848	S.431	
Opera Ernani (1844)	Concert paraphrase on Ernani	piano	1847	S.431a	These are different works, despite the similarity of the names. S.431a was formerly numbered S.457.
Opera Ernani (1844)	Ernani. Paraphrase de concert	piano	by 1849	S.432	These are different works, despite the similarity of the names. S.431a was formerly numbered S.457.
Opera Rigoletto (1851)	Rigoletto. Paraphrase de concert	piano	1859	S.434	
Opera Il trovatore (1853)	Miserere de Trovatore	piano	1859	S.433	
Opera Simon Boccanegra (1857)	Réminiscences de Boccanegra	piano	1882	S.438	
Opera Don Carlos (1867)	Coro di festa e marcia funebre	piano	1867–68	S.435	
Opera Aida (1871)	Danza sacra e duetto finale	piano	1871–72	S.436	Dedicated to Toni Raab
Requiem (1874): Agnus Dei	Agnus Dei de la Messe de Requiem	piano	1877	S.437	
Requiem (1874): Agnus Dei	Agnus Dei de la Messe de Requiem	organ or harmonium	1877–83	S.675c	

== Mikhail Vielgorsky ==
Original work	Liszt work	Forces	Date	S no.	Notes
Mazurka	Mazurka pour piano composée par un amateur de St. Pétersbourg, paraphrasée par F. L.	piano	1842	S.384	This mazurka was often misattributed to Alexander Alyabyev.
Romance "I Love" (Люблю я)	Transcription: 2nd version titled Autrefois	piano	1843	S.577	

Note: Vielgorski is also seen as Count Michael Wielhorski.

== Richard Wagner ==
Original work	Liszt work	Forces	Date	S no.	Notes
Opera Rienzi (1840)	Phantasiestück über Motive aus Rienzi ("Santo spirito cavaliere")	piano	1859	S.439	The Roman War Song "Santo spirito cavaliere" is from the finale of Act III. The work also quotes the Gebet (Prayer) from Act V and the Aufruf zum Kampf (Call to Arms) "Doch horet ihr der Trompete Ruf" from Act I.
Opera The Flying Dutchman (1843)	Spinning Chorus	piano	1860	S.440	
Opera The Flying Dutchman (1843)	Ballad	piano	pub. 1873	S.441	
Opera Tannhäuser (1845)	Overtüre zu Tannhäuser: Konzertparaphrase	piano	1848	S.442	
Opera Tannhäuser (1845)	"O du mein holder Abendstern"	piano	1849	S.444	
Opera Tannhäuser (1845)	"O du mein holder Abendstern"	cello and piano	1852	S.380	
Opera Tannhäuser (1845)	Entry of the Guests	piano	1852	S.445/1	Liszt published the Entry of the Guests along with Elsa's Bridal Procession from Lohengrin, as "Two Pieces from Tannhäuser and Lohengrin".
Opera Tannhäuser (1845)	Pilgrims' Chorus: Paraphrase	organ	1860	S.676	This paraphrase is not based on the Pilgrims' Chorus from Act III, but on a simplified version of the opening section of the Overture, which uses the same melody, but differs from the Chorus in both structure and key.
Opera Tannhäuser (1845)	Pilgrims' Chorus: Paraphrase	piano	c.1861	S.443	This paraphrase is not based on the Pilgrims' Chorus from Act III, but on a simplified version of the opening section of the Overture, which uses the same melody, but differs from the Chorus in both structure and key.
Opera Lohengrin (1850)	Elsa's Bridal Procession	piano	1852	S.445/2	Liszt published Elsa's Bridal Procession along with the Entry of the Guests from Tannhäuser, as "Two Pieces from Tannhäuser and Lohengrin".
Opera Lohengrin (1850)	1. Festival and Bridal Song; 2. Elsa's Dream; 3. Lohengrin's Rebuke	piano	1854	S.446	
Opera Tristan und Isolde (1859): Isolde's final aria, "Mild und leise"	Isoldens Liebestod	piano	1867	S.447	In his concert version of the Prelude (Overture) and Isolde's Act 3 final aria "Mild und leise", first performed in 1862 (several years before the premiere of the opera in 1865), Wagner called the Prelude the Liebestod (Love-death) while Isolde's final aria "Mild und leise" he called the Verklärung (Transfiguration). Liszt named his transcription of "Mild und leise" Isoldes Liebestod; he prefaced his score with a four-bar motto from the Love Duet from Act II, which in the opera is sung to the words "sehnend verlangter Liebestod". Liszt's transcription became well known throughout Europe well before Wagner's opera reached most places, and the final scene is now always called by the name Liszt gave it, Liebestod.
Opera Die Meistersinger von Nürnberg (1867)	"Am stillen Herd"	piano	1871	S.448	
Opera Das Rheingold (1869)	"Valhalla" from Der Ring des Nibelungen	piano	c.1876	S.449	Liszt based this on "The Entry of the Gods into Valhalla", the closing scene of Das Rheingold, the opening opera of the Ring. However, as it conforms to no single passage in that scene, it is thus a paraphrase, not strictly a transcription.
Opera Parsifal (1882)	Feierlicher Marsch zum heiligen Gral	piano	1882	S.450	

== Carl Maria von Weber ==
Original work	Liszt work	Forces	Date	S no.	Notes
Leier und Schwert, six 4-part men's choruses, Op. 42, J.168–173 (1814): No. 2, Lutzows wilde Jagd, J.168; No. 3, Gebet vor der Schlacht, J.173; No. 6, Schwertlied, J.169	Leier und Schwert – Heroïde	piano	1846–47	S.452	An Introduction was followed by Schwertlied, Gebet vor der Schlacht and Lutzows wilde Jagd.
Jubelouvertüre, Op. 59, J.245 (1818)	Transcription	piano	1846	S.576	
Polacca brillante in E major "L'hilarité", piano, Op. 72, J.268 (1819)	Polonaise brillante	piano and orchestra	c.1851	S.367	Dedicated to Adolf von Henselt. FP of S.367 Weimar, 13 April 1851, Salomon Jadassohn (piano), Liszt (conductor). Liszt also arranged S.367 for piano solo (S.455), which was the solo part with ossias.
Polacca brillante in E major "L'hilarité", piano, Op. 72, J.268 (1819)	Polonaise brillante	piano	c.1851	S.455	Dedicated to Adolf von Henselt. FP of S.367 Weimar, 13 April 1851, Salomon Jadassohn (piano), Liszt (conductor). Liszt also arranged S.367 for piano solo (S.455), which was the solo part with ossias.
Opera Der Freischütz, Op. 77, J.277 (1821)	Overture	piano	1846	S.575	
Opera Der Freischütz, Op. 77, J.277 (1821)	Freischütz Fantasy	piano	1840‑41	S.451	
Konzertstück in F minor, piano and orchestra, Op. 79, J.282 (1821)	Transcription	piano	1868–70	S.576a	
Konzertstück in F minor, piano and orchestra, Op. 79, J.282 (1821)	Transcription	piano and orchestra	1868–70	S.367a	The piano part appears to be a slightly altered version of S.576a, which is played with Weber's original orchestration.
Preciosa, incidental music, Op. 78, J.279 (1820): "Einsam bin ich, nicht alleine"	Transcription	piano	1848	S.453	
Partsong Schlummerlied, 4 male voices, Op. 68/4, J.285 (1822)	"Schlummerlied mit Arabesken"	piano	1848	S.454	
Opera Oberon, J.306 (1826)	Overture	piano	1843	S.574	

== August Heinrich von Weyrauch ==
Original work	Liszt work	Forces	Date	S no.	Notes
Song "Nach Osten!" (1824)	No. 1 of Sechs Melodien von Franz Schubert	piano	1846	S.563/1	August Heinrich von Weyrauch, also known as Hans von Weyrauch (1788–1851). The song was reissued in 1843 with new words, a new title "Adieu" (which was translated as "Lebe wohl"), and misattributed to Franz Schubert. Liszt included it with 5 genuine Schubert songs in his collection of 6 transcriptions.

== Juliusz Zarębski ==
Original work	Liszt work	Forces	Date	S no.	Notes
Danses galiciennes, piano 4-hands (1880)	Orchestration	orchestra	1881	S.364	Zarębski was a pupil of Liszt.

== Géza Zichy ==
Original work	Liszt work	Forces	Date	S no.	Notes
Valse d'Adèle, piano left‑hand	Valse d'Adèle: Transcription brillante à deux mains	piano 2-hands	pub. 1877	S.456	Count Géza Zichy lost his right arm in a hunting accident at age 15. He later became a pionereering left-hand pianist and composer of works for piano left-hand, including the first known concerto for piano left-hand and orchestra (1902).
Ballad "Der Zaubersee"	"Der Zaubersee"	voice and orchestra	?	S.377	Count Géza Zichy lost his right arm in a hunting accident at age 15. He later became a pionereering left-hand pianist and composer of works for piano left-hand, including the first known concerto for piano left-hand and orchestra (1902).

== Index of S. numbers ==
- S.54: Giuseppe Baini
- S.116: Ernest II, Duke of Saxe-Coburg and Gotha
- S.120: Hector Berlioz
- S.122: Ludwig van Beethoven
- S.126b/2: Wenzel Robert von Gallenberg
- S.127: Frédéric Chopin
- S.128: Charles Philippe Lafont
- S.140, 141: Niccolò Paganini
- S.147: Anton Diabelli
- S.149: Gioachino Rossini
- S.150: Gioachino Rossini, Gaspare Spontini
- S.155/3: Franz Schubert
- S.156/10: Ferdinand Huber
- S.156/11: Ernest Knop
- S. 156/12, 156a/1: Ferdinand Huber
- S.156a/3: Ernest Knop
- S.159: Guillaume-Louis Cottrau
- S.161/3: Giovanni Bononcini (misattrib. Salvator Rosa)
- S.162: Guillaume-Louis Cottrau
- S.162/2: Gioachino Rossini
- S.168: Prince Louis Ferdinand of Prussia
- S.172/4: Grand Duchess Maria Pavlovna of Russia
- S.179, 180: Johann Sebastian Bach
- S.181: George Frideric Handel
- S.183: Jacques Arcadelt, Pierre-Louis Dietsch
- S.205, 206: Mihály Mosonyi
- S.207a: Alexander Borodin
- S.208a/2: Wenzel Robert von Gallenberg
- S.234: Josef Krov
- S.236/2: René de Galard de Béarn, Marquis de Brassac
- S.237: Claude Joseph Rouget de Lisle
- S.241/1: László Fáy
- S.241/2: János Bihari
- S.244/19: Kornél Ábrányi
- S.245: Kornél Ábrányi
- S.246: Ludmilla Gizycka-Zámoyská
- S.249/2: Frédéric Chopin
- S.250/1: Alexander Alyabyev
- S.250/2: Pyotr Bulakhov
- S.252: Manuel García
- S.256: Alexander Borodin
- S.257: Felix Mendelssohn
- S.259: Giacomo Meyerbeer
- S.351: Hans von Bülow
- S.352: Peter Cornelius
- S.353: Béni Egressy, Ferenc Erkel
- S.360: Gregorio Allegri, Wolfgang Amadeus Mozart
- S.363: Franz Schubert
- S.364: Juliusz Zarębski
- S.367, 367a: Carl Maria von Weber
- S.368: Francis Korbay
- S.375, 376: Franz Schubert
- S.377: Géza Zichy
- S.379b: Ludmilla Gizycka-Zámoyská
- S.380: Richard Wagner
- S.383a: Kornél Ábrányi
- S.384: Alexander Alyabyev (misattrib.), Mikhail Vielgorsky
- S.385, 385a, 386, 387: Daniel Auber
- S.388, 389: Ludwig van Beethoven
- S.390–394: Vincenzo Bellini
- S.395, 396: Hector Berlioz
- S.397–400, 400a, 401, 402: Gaetano Donizetti
- S.403: Giuseppe Donizetti
- S.404: Ernest II, Duke of Saxe-Coburg and Gotha
- S.405: Ferenc Erkel
- S.405a: Leó Festetics
- S.406: Mikhail Glinka
- S.407, 408, 409: Charles Gounod
- S.409a: Fromental Halévy
- S.410: Felix Mendelssohn
- S.411: Saverio Mercadante
- S.412–416: Giacomo Meyerbeer
- S.417: Mihály Mosonyi
- S.418: Wolfgang Amadeus Mozart
- S.419: Giovanni Pacini
- S.420: Niccolò Paganini
- S.421: Joachim Raff
- S.422–424: Gioachino Rossini
- S.425–427: Franz Schubert
- S.428: Mariano Soriano
- S.429: Pyotr Ilyich Tchaikovsky
- S.430: János Végh
- S.431, 431a, 432–438: Giuseppe Verdi
- S.439–450: Richard Wagner
- S.451–455: Carl Maria von Weber
- S.456: Géza Zichy
- S.458: Saverio Mercadante
- S.461: Gregorio Allegri, Wolfgang Amadeus Mozart
- S.462, 463: Johann Sebastian Bach
- S.464–469: Ludwig van Beethoven
- S.470–475: Hector Berlioz
- S.476, 477, 477a: Louise Bertin
- S.478: Pyotr Bulakhov
- S.479: Hans von Bülow
- S.480: Frédéric Chopin
- S.481: August Conradi
- S.482: César Cui
- S.483: Alexander Dargomyzhsky
- S.483bis: Ferdinand David
- S.484, 484/19bis: Ferdinand David
- S.485: Josef Dessauer
- S.485a: Felix Draeseke
- S.485b: Ernest II, Duke of Saxe-Coburg and Gotha
- S.486: Béni Egressy, Ferenc Erkel
- S.487: Leó Festetics
- S.488, 489: Robert Franz
- S.490: Adalbert von Goldschmidt
- S.491: Charles Gounod
- S.492: Johann von Herbeck
- S.493: Johann Nepomuk Hummel
- S.494–497: Eduard Lassen
- S.498: Otto Lessmann
- S.506b: Giuseppe Baini
- S.522: Ernest II, Duke of Saxe-Coburg and Gotha
- S.547, 548: Felix Mendelssohn
- S.549: Giacomo Meyerbeer
- S.550: Wolfgang Amadeus Mozart
- S.551: F. Pezzini
- S.551a: Joachim Raff
- S,552, 553: Gioachino Rossini
- S.554, 554a: Anton Rubinstein
- S.555: Camille Saint-Saëns
- S.557–562: Franz Schubert
- S.563: Franz Schubert, August Heinrich von Weyrauch
- S.564, 565: Franz Schubert
- S.566–568, 569/1–7: Robert Schumann
- S.569/8–10: Clara Schumann
- S.570: Robert Schumann
- S.570a: Bedřich Smetana
- S.571: Louis Spohr
- S.571a: Johann Strauss II, Karl Tausig
- S.572: Jules Massenet, Imre Széchényi
- S.574–576, 576a: Carl Maria von Weber
- S.577: Mikhail Vielgorsky
- S.577a: John Field
- S.607: Ernest II, Duke of Saxe-Coburg and Gotha
- S.620: Josef Krov
- S.623a: Kornél Ábrányi
- S.624: Giacomo Meyerbeer
- S.627: Vincenzo Bellini
- S.628: Hector Berlioz
- S.628a: Béni Egressy, Ferenc Erkel
- S.629: Mikhail Glinka
- S.630: Giacomo Meyerbeer
- S.631: Joachim Raff
- S.632: Franz Schubert
- S.633: Gregorio Allegri, Wolfgang Amadeus Mozart
- S.634: Ludwig van Beethoven
- S.634a: Wolfgang Amadeus Mozart
- S.649: Ludwig van Beethoven
- S.654, 655: Vincenzo Bellini
- S.656: Wolfgang Amadeus Mozart
- S.657a: Ludwig van Beethoven
- S.658: Gregorio Allegri, Wolfgang Amadeus Mozart
- S.659: Jacques Arcadelt, Pierre-Louis Dietsch
- S.660, 661: Johann Sebastian Bach
- S.662: Frédéric Chopin
- S.663: Orlande de Lassus
- S.669c: Giuseppe Baini
- S.673: Johann Sebastian Bach
- S.675: Otto Nicolai
- S.675a: Alexander Ritter
- S.675c: Giuseppe Verdi
- S.676: Richard Wagner
- S.679: Gioachino Rossini
- S.682: Gioachino Rossini
- S.683a: Francis Korbay
- S.684: Luigi Pantaleoni
- S.685: Grand Duchess Maria Pavlovna of Russia
- S.686: Felix Draeseke
- S.694: Thomas Arne
- S.697: Wolfgang Amadeus Mozart
- S.698: Léo Delibes
- S.700, 700a: Niccolò Paganini
- S.700h: Charles Philippe Lafont
- S.739, 740: Ludwig van Beethoven
- S.741: Hector Berlioz
- S.742: Gaetano Donizetti
- S.743: Charles Gounod
- S.743a: Fromental Halévy
- S.744: Gaetano Donizetti
- S.748: Wolfgang Amadeus Mozart
- S.750, 751: Gioachino Rossini
- S.752: Anton Rubinstein
- S.753: Franz Schubert
- S.754: Pier Adolfo Tirindelli
- S.755a: Thomas Arne
- S.761: Frédéric Chopin

== Sources ==
- Grove's Dictionary of Music and Musicians, 5th ed, 1954, Vol. V, pp. 264–316, Franz Liszt: Catalogue of Works
