= Zbruyev =

Zbruyev or Zbruev (Russian: Збруев) is a Russian masculine surname originating from the noun zbruya (harness); its feminine counterpart is Zbruyeva or Zbrueva. It may refer to the following notable people:

- Aleksandr Zbruyev (born 1938), Russian theatrical and cinema actor
- Evgenia Zbrueva (1867–1936), Russian opera singer
