= Song to the Evening Star =

Aria from Richard Wagner’s "Tannhäuser"

"Song to the Evening Star" ("O du, mein holder Abendstern"), also known as "Oh Star Of Eve", is an aria sung by the character Wolfram (baritone) in the third act of Richard Wagner's 1845 opera Tannhäuser. Wolfram greets the Evening Star (the planet Venus) for offering hope in darkness, in an implied contrast to Tannhäuser's lover Venus at the beginning of the opera, in her underground realm Venusberg.

In 1849, Franz Liszt wrote a paraphrase for piano of this aria, S. 444, arranged with Bernhard Cossmann for cello and piano in 1852 as S. 380. It has also been arranged for voice and piano, and for various wind instruments and piano.
