= Emil Ábrányi =

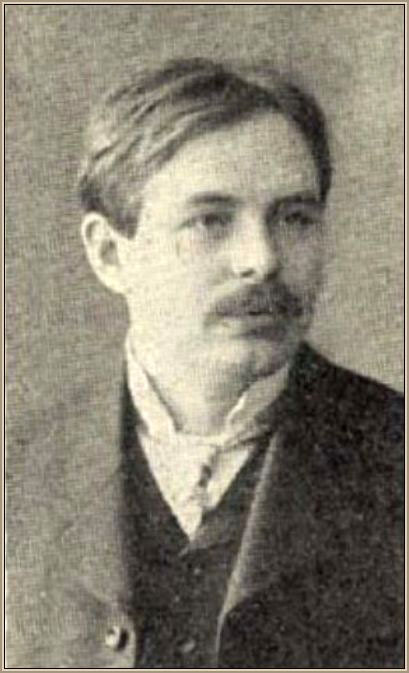
- Emil, 1910s
- Born: 22 September 1882; Budapest, Austria-Hungary
- Died: 11 February 1970 (aged 87); Budapest, Hungary
- Occupation: Opera director
- Era: 20th century

Emil Ábrányi (22 September 1882 – 11 February 1970) was a Hungarian composer, conductor, and opera director.

== Life ==
He was conductor at the Royal Hungarian Opera House from 1911 to 1919, and director there from 1919 to 1920. In 1921, he became the director at the Budapest Municipal Theatre, where he remained until 1926. For many years he taught conducting at the Budapest Academy of Music. He composed twelve operas of which only six have been performed professionally. He was the grandson of the composer Kornél Ábrányi.

== Operas ==
- A ködkirály (The King of Mist) (1 act, libretto by Á. Pásztor, 17 May 1903, Royal Hungarian Opera House, Budapest)
- Monna Vanna (3 acts, libretto by Emil Ábrányi, Sr. (father of the composer) after Maeterlinck's drama of the same name, 2 March 1907, Royal Hungarian Opera House, Budapest).
- Paolo és Francesca (3 acts, libretto after Dante by Emil Ábrányi, Sr., 13 January 1912, Royal Hungarian Opera House, Budapest)
- Don Quijote (3 acts, libretto after Cervantes by Emil Ábrányi, Sr., 30 November 1917, Royal Hungarian Opera House, Budapest)
- Ave Maria: Májusi intermezzo (A May Intermezzo) (1 act, 25 February 1922, Budapest Municipal Theatre)
- A vak katona (The Blind Soldier) (1 act, libretto by E. Sas., 11 June 1923, Budapest Municipal Theatre).
- Az éneklö dervis (The Singing Dervish) (2 acts, libretto by N. W. Khayatt, 1937, unperformed)
- Liliomos herceg (The Prince of the Lilies) (3 acts, libretto by Bohdaneczky, 1938, unperformed).
- Bizánc (Byzantium) (3 acts, libretto by E. Innocent-Vincze, after F. Herczeg, 1942, unperformed)
- Éva boszorkány (Eva the Witch) (3 acts, libretto after F. Herczeg., 1944, unperformed)
- Balatoni rege (A Balaton Legend) (3 acts, libretto after F. Herczeg., 1945, unperformed)
- A Tamás-templom karnagya (The Cantor of the St. Thomas Church) (3 acts, libretto by G. Láng., 1947, unperformed; the first opera written on the life of Johann Sebastian Bach)
