= Shine, Shine, My Star =

External videos
- Shine, Shine, My Star
- Oleg Pogudin singing Shine, Shine, My Star on YouTube
- Vadim Dubovsky singing Shine, Shine, My Star on YouTube
- Gennady Trofimov singing Shine, Shine, My Star on YouTube

"Shine, Shine, My Star" (Russian: "Гори, гори, моя звезда") is an acclaimed Russian romance.

The authorship of the song was uncertain for some time, being ascribed to various people, including Nikolay Gumilyov and Ivan Bunin. A popular belief attributed it to Russian Admiral Aleksandr Kolchak until the 1847 sheet music was found in archives.

According to Russian romance researcher Yelena Ukolova, the song was created amid celebrations of the 700th anniversary of Moscow in January 1847. The music was composed by Pyotr Bulakhov (Петр Булахов), and the lyrics written by student Vladimir Chuyevsky (Владимир Чуевский). However, the romance did not become popular until the eve of World War I when singer Vladimir Sabinin re-arranged it. The breakthrough came in 1915 when Sabinin's gramophone record appeared.

During the Soviet years, the romance was labelled a 'white one' and obliterated for a while. In 1944 it was performed on record by Georgi Vinogradov. But, according to Ukolova, it was the 1956 American film War and Peace that made it possible for this romance to make a true comeback in USSR.

The romance itself persisted only in tenors' repertoire until the bass singer Boris Shtokolov broke the custom.

== Lyrics ==
"Гори, гори, моя звезда" by Feodor Chaliapin
The Song "Shine, Shine, My Star" sung in Russian by Feodor Chaliapin

Russian language	Transliteration	Translation
1. Гори, гори, моя звезда. Звезда любви приветная! Ты у меня одна заветная, Другой не будет никогда. 2. Сойдёт ли ночь на землю ясная, Звёзд много блещет в небесах, Но ты одна, моя прекрасная, Горишь в отрадных мне лучах. 3. Звезда надежды благодатная, Звезда любви волшебных дней, Ты будешь вечно незакатная В душе тоскующей моей! 4. Твоих лучей небесной силою Вся жизнь моя озарена. Умру ли я — ты над могилою Гори, сияй, моя звезда!	1. Gori, gori, moya zvezda, Zvezda lyubvi, privetnaya! Ty u menya odna zavetnaya, Drugoy ne budet nikogda. 2. Soydyot li noch na zemlyu yasnaya, Zvyozd mnogo bleshchet v nebesakh, No ty odna, moya prekrasnaya, Gorish v otradnykh mne luchakh. 3. Zvezda nadezhdy blagodatnaya, Zvezda lyubvi volshebnykh dney, Ty budesh vechno nezakatnaya V dushe toskuyushchey moyey. 4. Tvoikh luchey nebesnoy siloyu Vsya zhizn moya ozarena. Umru li ya, ty nad mogiloyu Gori, siyay, moya zvezda!	1. Shine, shine, my star, Shine, affable star! You are my only cherished one, Another there will never be. 2. If a clear night comes down upon the earth Many stars shine in the skies, But you alone, my gorgeous one, Shine in pleasant beams to me 3. O blessed star of hope, The star of love of magic days, You will be eternally unwithering In my longing soul. 4. By the heavenly strength of your beams My whole life is illuminated And if I die, over my grave Shine, shine on, my star!

The lyrics were later adapted into 3 verses. The most famous version of this song, as sung by Anna German, has the following lyrics:

Гори, гори, моя звезда.
Звезда любви приветная,
Ты у меня одна заветная,
Другой не будет никогда.
Ты у меня одна заветная,
Другой не будет никогда

Звезда любви, звезда волшебная
Звезда моих минувших дней.
Ты будешь вечно неизменная
В душе измученной моей.
Ты будешь вечно неизменная
В душе измученной моей!

Лучей твоих неясной силою
Вся жизнь моя озарена.
Умру ли я — ты над могилою
Гори, сияй, моя звезда!
Умру ли я — ты над могилою
Гори, сияй, моя звезда!

The following version, by Peter Farnbank, can be sung to the melody of "Gori, gori, moya zvezda".

“Oh shine, oh shine, my wondrous star”

1.

Oh shine, oh shine, my wondrous star,
Oh star of love, you welcome are.

||: Here in my heart are you the precious one:

No place for more: there can be none! :||

2.

Tho’_a million stars light up from high,
On cloudless nights, both earth and sky,

||: ‘Tis none but you, my wondrous star so bright,

That shine on me such glorious light! :||

3.

Enchanted star of love divine,
Of cherished bygone days of mine.

||: But come what may, in my tormented soul

There shall you stay to keep me whole! :||

4.

How brightly beams your heav'nly ray.
Shine on my paths of life today.

||: Forever shine! Ev'n on my grave afar!

Oh brightly shine, my wondrous star! :||
