= Pyotr Bulakhov =

Russian composer

Pyotr Petrovich Bulakhov
- Born: 1822
- Died: 2 December 1885 (aged 62–63) Vagankovskoye Cemetery, Moscow
- Genres: Russian chanson
- Occupation: Composer

Pyotr Petrovich Bulakhov (Петр Петрович Булахов; 1822 in Moscow – 2 December 1885 in Kuskovo) was a Russian composer of mostly Russian chanson. He's considered a notable composer due to the chanson he composed having reached critical popularity during his lifetime.

== Family ==
Bulakhov came from a very musical family. His father, Pyotr Alexandrovich Bulakhov (1793?–1837), was a classical singer while his brother, Pavel Petrovich Bulakhov (1824–1875)., was a minor composer and operatic singer during his time who premiered the role of the Prince in Alexander Dargomyzhsky's 1856 opera "Rusalka."

Bulakhov's daughter was an opera singer Yevgeniya Ivanovna Zbruyeva (1867?–1936).

== Career ==
His compositions were widely sung during his lifetime, totaling up to 100 written. In the 1870s, a fire destroyed his apartment and in this fire, it is thought that many works were burned. His song "You Will Not Believe" ("Ты не поверишь") was set as piano transcriptions by Franz Liszt (Chanson Bohemienne S.250/2), Adolf von Henselt (Fantaisie sur un Air Bohémien-Russe, Op 16) and Ferdinand Beyer (Hommage à la Russie, Op.100 No. 9).

== Songs ==
- Shine, Shine, My Star
- Do Not Awaken Memories
- Don't Wake Me Up
- I Met You
- In the Wide-Open Field
- A dainty mouth pursed in anger
- No, I Do Not Love You
- On parting she spoke
- Over the Fields, the Clean Fields
- The Rendezvous
- The Troika Speeds, the Troika Gallops
- You Will Not Believe How Cute You Are
