= Evgenia Zbrueva =

Russian opera singer

Evgenija Zbrueva
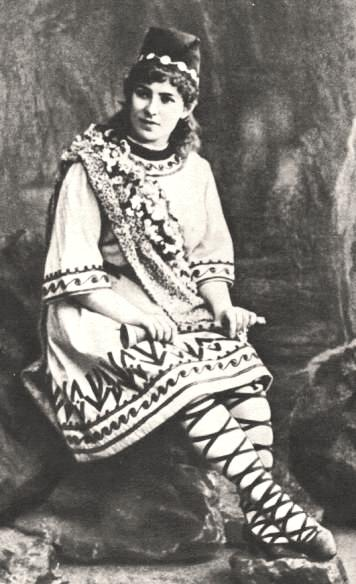
- Evgenija Zbrueva as Lel in Sněhurka (1894)
- Born: Evgenija Ivanovna Zbrueva; 26 December 1867 (or January 7, 1868); Moscow
- Died: 20 October 1936; Moscow
- Other names: Evegeniya Zbrujewa, Evegenia Zbroueff, Yevgenia Zbruyeva
- Occupation: Singer

Evgenija Ivanovna Zbrueva (December 26, 1867 or January 7, 1868 – 20 October 1936), in Russian Евге́ния Ива́новна Збру́ева, was a Russian contralto opera singer.

== Early life ==
Zbrueva was born in Moscow, the daughter of composer Pyotr Bulakhov. (Her surname came from her mother's first husband, because her parents were not legally married.) She trained as a singer at the Moscow Conservatory, under E. A. Lavrovskaya.

== Career ==
Zbrueva was a contralto in the Moscow Imperial Opera at the Bolshoi Theatre from 1894, and with the Mariinsky Theatre from 1905 until 1918, including appearances in Paris and Munich. In 1915 she was appointed Professor of Singing at Petrograd Conservatory. She was named an Honored Artist of the USSR in 1922.

Zbrueva's repertoire included roles in Glinka's A Life for the Tsar (1894), Saint-Saëns' Henry VIII, Rimsky-Korsakov's The Legend of the Invisible City of Kitezh and the Maiden Fevroniya (1907) and The Snow Maiden (1894), Tchaikovsky's Cherevichki, Mussorgsky's Khovanshchina, Ruslan and Lyudmila, Prince Igor, and Carmen.

== Personal life ==
Zbrueva died in Moscow in 1936, aged 67 years. Archival recordings of Zbrueva have been included on several anthology recordings, including Singers of imperial Russia. Volume III (1992, Pearl Records), Great singers at the Mariinsky Theatre (1994, Nimbus Records), Great Singers in Moscow (1996, Nimbus Records), and Rimsky-Korsakov performed by his contemporaries (1999, Russian Disc).
