= Francis Korbay =

Hungarian musician

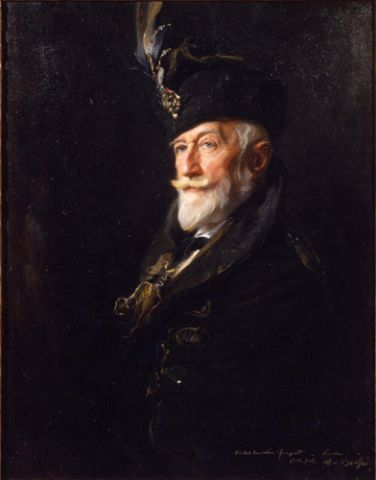
Francis Korbay from a portrait by Philip de László

Francis Alexander Korbay (May 8, 1846 – March 9, 1913) was a Hungarian musician.

== Life ==
He was born in Pest His father was a landowner and his mother was a descendant of the poet István Gyöngyösi. His father joined the revolutionary party, and suffered imprisonment and the forfeiture of his estates. The youth turned his attention to music, studying piano with Moronyi and composition with Robert Volkmann. At nineteen, he found himself in possession of a robust tenor voice. He studied voice with Gustave-Hippolyte Roger, and in 1868 he made his operatic debut at the National Theatre of Budapest. But the strain was too great, and eventually he abandoned this career and applied himself to pianoforte study under his godfather Franz Liszt, of whose music he became a well-known interpreter.

He went to England in 1871, but finding insufficient support, he went to New York and toured in the United States with the German tenor, Theodor Wachtel (1823 - 1893). Korbay established a music school with his wife, Ilona Ravasz – also a pupil of Liszt – in New York. He ultimately established himself as a professor of singing in the city. Brooklyn born soprano Susan Strong (August 3, 1870 - London: March 11, 1946) and American soprano Lillian Henschel (1860 – 1901) were among his pupils. He had not neglected his singing abilities entirely and from time to time sang in recitals.

In 1874, Korbay returned to London, and soon established a teaching connection. In 1894, he became a professor at the Royal College of Music, and remained in that position until 1903.

He had many successful European tours, and was also extremely popular in England. Korbay wrote many pianoforte pieces and songs, but he was best known by his collections of Magyar folk songs, which attained a very wide popularity, among which Mohac's Field may be mentioned in particular. Several of his works was on the program of the Proms, his last orchestral work, the Hungarian Overture was premiered on the Proms in 1912, under the baton of Henry Wood.

He died in London, which for many years was his home, March 9, 1913.

== Sources ==
- Chisholm, Hugh, ed. (1922). "Korbay, Francis" . Encyclopædia Britannica (12th ed.). London & New York: The Encyclopædia Britannica Company.
- bach-cantatas.com
