= Kornél Ábrányi =

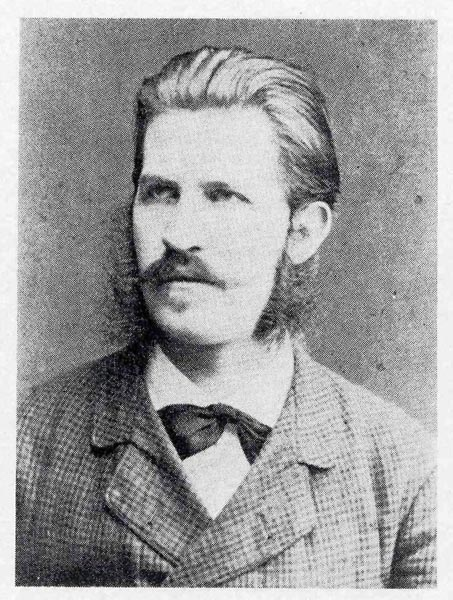
- A picture of Pianist Kornél Ábrányi 1860

Background information
- Born: Kornél Ábrányi; 15 October 1822; Hungary
- Died: 20 December 1903 (aged 81) Budapest, Hungary
- Occupations: Pianist, music writer and theorist, and composer

Teacher & Secretary at Franz Liszt Academy of Music

Kornél Ábrányi (Hungarian pronunciation: [ˈkorneːl ˈaːbraːɲi]; 15 October 1822 – 20 December 1903) was a Hungarian pianist, music writer and theorist, and composer. He was born in Szentgyörgyábrány. A pupil of Frédéric Chopin, and a close friend of Franz Liszt, whose music he championed, Ábrányi chiefly wrote music for piano, but also composed chamber music, choral works, and lieder. He began teaching at the Franz Liszt Academy of Music at its founding in 1875 and became its secretary.

He was one of several people to use the pseudonym Kákay Aranyos.

Ábrányi died in Budapest, aged 81. His grandson was the composer Emil Ábrányi.
