= Ferruccio Busoni discography =

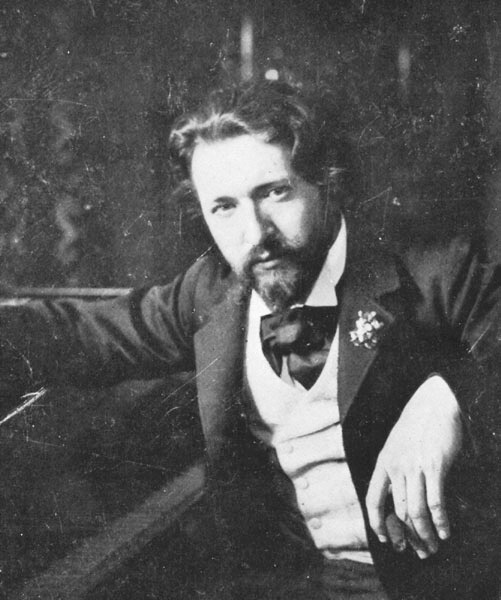
Ferruccio Busoni

Ferruccio Busoni discography is a list of recordings of music composed or adapted by Ferruccio Busoni. For recordings of music with Busoni as pianist, see Ferruccio Busoni discography (as pianist).

== List of recorded works by category ==
This list of recorded works is not complete. The recording artists are listed under each item with a link (^{v}) to the recording description in the section Recording details. Details for some recordings are on the individual artist's page, and these links are indicated with ( • ). The date given is for the completion of composition.

=== Soloist with orchestra ===
==== Original works ====
Concertstück [Concert Piece] for piano and orchestra, Op. 31a (1890) BV 236

^{v} Carlo Grante, piano; I Pomeriggi Musicali; Marco Zuccarini, conductor

Violin Concerto in D, Op. 35a (1897) BV 243

^{v} Jaime Laredo, violin; Daniel Barenboim, conductor
^{v} Ingolf Turban, violin; Lior Shambadal, conductor
^{v} Frank Peter Zimmermann, violin; John Storgårds, conductor
^{v} Manoug Parikian, violin; Jascha Horenstein, conductor (LP, limited availability)
^{v} Joseph Szigeti, violin; Thomas Scherman, conductor

Piano Concerto in C major, Op. 39, with choral finale (1904) BV 247

^{v} Volker Banfield, piano; Lutz Herbig, conductor (72:46)
^{v} Peter Donohoe, piano; Mark Elder, conductor (74:22)
^{v} Marc-André Hamelin, piano; Mark Elder, conductor (71:48)
^{v} Gunnar Johansen, piano; Hans Schmidt-Isserstedt, conductor (68:25) (1956, mono)
^{v} David Lively, piano; Michael Gielen, conductor (72:05)
^{v} Pietro Massa, piano; Stefan Malzew, conductor (78:28)
^{v} Noel Mewton-Wood, piano; Thomas Beecham, conductor (68:56) (1948, mono)
^{v} John Ogdon, piano; Daniell Revenaugh, conductor (68:30)
^{v} Garrick Ohlsson, piano; Christoph von Dohnányi, conductor (71:44)
^{v} Viktoria Postnikova, piano; Gennady Rozhdestvensky, conductor (89:25)
^{v} François-Joël Thiollier, piano; Michael Schønwandt, conductor (68:56)
^{v}John Ogdon, piano; Daniell Revenaugh, conductor (68:30)

Indian Fantasy Op. 44, for piano and orchestra (1914) BV 264

^{v} Nelson Goerner, piano; Neeme Järvi, conductor
^{v} Carlo Grante, piano; Il Pomeriggi Musicali; Marco Zuccarini, conductor

Concertino, Op. 48, for clarinet and small orchestra (1918) BV 276

^{v} John Bradbury, clarinet; Neeme Järvi, conductor
^{v} Ulf Rodenhäuser, clarinet; Gerd Albrecht, conductor

Divertimento, Op. 52, for flute and orchestra (1920) BV 285

^{v} Jean Claude Gérard, flute; Gerd Albrecht, conductor

==== Transcriptions and arrangements ====
Bach: Concerto for harpsichord and strings No. 1 in D minor, BWV 1052, tr. for piano and orchestra (1899) BV B 28

^{v} Dinu Lipatti, piano; Eduard van Beinum, conductor

=== Orchestral ===
Symphonische Suite Op. 25 (1883) BV 201

^{v} Berlin Radio Symphony Orchestra; Arturo Tamayo, conductor

Geharnischte Suite [Armored Suite] Op. 34a (Second Orchestral Suite) (1895, 1903) BV 242

^{v} Timișoara Banatul Philharmonic; Jean-François Antonioli, conductor
^{v} BBC Philharmonic; Neeme Järvi, conductor

Eine Lustspielouvertüre [Comedy Overture] (1904) BV 245

^{v} NDR Symphony Orchestra; Werner Andreas Albert, conductor
^{v} Philharmonia Orchestra; Adrian Boult, conductor
^{v} BBC Philharmonic; Neeme Järvi, conductor
^{v} Berlin Radio Symphony Orchestra; Arturo Tamayo, conductor

Turandot Suite Op. 41, for orchestra (1905, 1911, 1917) BV 248

^{v} Cincinnati Symphony Orchestra; Michael Gielen, conductor (1911 version)
^{v} Hong Kong Philharmonic; Samuel Wong, conductor (1905 version)
^{v} Philharmonic Orchestra of La Scala; Riccardo Muti, conductor (1905 version; nos. 4 & 6 omitted)
^{v} Royal Philharmonic Orchestra; Jascha Horenstein, conductor (1917 version; Nos. 4, 6, & 8 only)
^{v} Orchestra Filarmonica della Scala; Riccardo Muti, conductor

Verzweiflung und Ergebung [Despair and Resignation] (addition to Turandot Suite) (1911) BV 248a

^{v} Berlin Radio Symphony Orchestra; Gerd Albrecht, conductor
^{v} Cincinnati Symphony Orchestra; Michael Gielen, conductor

Altoums Warnung [Altoum's Warning] (addition to Turandot Suite) (1917) BV 248b

^{v} Royal Philharmonic Orchestra; Jascha Horenstein, conductor

Berceuse élégiaque for orchestra, Op. 42 (1909) BV 252a

^{v} NDR Symphony Orchestra; Werner Andreas Albert, conductor
^{v} BBC Symphony Orchestra; Michael Gielen, conductor
^{v} BBC Philharmonic; Neeme Järvi, conductor
^{v} Berlin Radio Symphony Orchestra; Arturo Tamayo, conductor
^{v} Hong Kong Philharmonic; Samuel Wong, conductor
^{v} New Philharmonia Orchestra; Frederik Prausnitz, conductor

Die Brautwahl Suite, Op. 45 (1912) BV 261

^{v} Timișoara Banatul Philharmonic; Jean-François Antonioli, conductor
^{v} BBC Philharmonic; Neeme Järvi, conductor

Nocturne Symphonique Op. 43 (1913) BV 262

^{v} NDR Symphony Orchestra; Werner Andreas Albert, conductor
^{v} Berlin Radio Symphony Orchestra; Gerd Albrecht, conductor
^{v} Royal Philharmonic Orchestra; Jascha Horenstein, conductor

Rondò Arlecchinesco Op. 46 (1915) BV 266

^{v} NDR Symphony Orchestra; Werner Andreas Albert, conductor
^{v} Berlin Radio Symphony Orchestra; Gerd Albrecht, conductor
^{v} BBC Symphony Orchestra; Aaron Copland, conductor

Gesang vom Reigen der Geister [Song of the Dance of the Spirits], Op. 47 (1915) BV 269

^{v} NDR Symphony Orchestra; Werner Andreas Albert, conductor
^{v} BBC Philharmonic; Neeme Järvi, conductor
^{v} Haydn Orchestra; Harry Newstone, conductor
^{v} Berlin Radio Symphony Orchestra; Arturo Tamayo, conductor

Sarabande and Cortège: Two Studies for "Doctor Faust," Op. 51 (1919) BV 282

^{v} Berlin Radio Symphony Orchestra; Gerd Albrecht, conductor
^{v} Cincinnati Symphony Orchestra; Michael Gielen, conductor
^{v} BBC Philharmonic; Neeme Järvi, conductor
^{v} Hong Kong Philharmonic; Samuel Wong, conductor
^{v} Royal Philharmonic Orchestra;Daniell Revenaugh, conductor

Tanzwalzer [Dance Waltzes], Op. 53 (1920) BV 288

^{v} NDR Symphony Orchestra; Werner Andreas Albert, conductor
^{v} Berlin Radio Symphony Orchestra; Gerd Albrecht, conductor
^{v} BBC Philharmonic; Neeme Järvi, conductor

=== Chamber ===
==== Piano and strings ====
Concerto for piano and strings, Op. 17 (1878) BV 80

^{v} Carlo Grante, piano; Il Pomeriggi Musicali; Marco Zuccarini, conductor

==== Violin ====
Violin Sonata in C major (1876) BV 41

^{v} Lara Lev, violin; Matti Raekallio, piano

Four Bagatelles, Op. 28, for violin and piano (1888) BV 229

^{v} Joseph Lin, violin; Benjamin Loeb, piano

Violin Sonata No. 1 in E minor, Op. 29 (1889) BV 234

^{v} Joseph Lin, violin; Benjamin Loeb, piano
^{v} Lara Lev, violin; Matti Raekallio, piano

Violin Sonata No. 2 in E minor, Op. 36a (1900) BV 244

^{v} Joseph Lin, violin; Benjamin Loeb, piano
^{v} Lara Lev, violin; Matti Raekallio, piano
^{v} Frank Peter Zimmermann, violin; Enrico Pace, piano
^{v} Joseph Szigeti, violin; Mieczyslaw Horszowski, piano

==== String quartet ====
String Quartet No. 1 in C major, Op. 19 (1882) BV 208

^{v} Pellegrini Quartet

String Quartet No. 2 in D minor, Op. 26 (1887) BV 225

^{v} Pellegrini-Quartett

==== Clarinet ====
Suite Op. 10, for clarinet and piano (1878) BV 88

• Fredrik Fors, clarinet; Sveinung Bjelland, piano
^{v} Dieter Klöcker, clarinet; Werner Genuit, piano (nos. 1, 2, 4, 5, 6)

Solo dramatique, Op. 13, for clarinet and piano (1879) BV 101

^{v} Dieter Klöcker, clarinet; Werner Genuit, piano

Andantino Op. 41, for clarinet and piano (1879) BV 107

^{v} Dieter Klöcker, clarinet; Werner Genuit, piano

Serenade no.2 Op. 42, for clarinet and piano (1879) BV 108

^{v} Dieter Klöcker, clarinet; Werner Genuit, piano

Sonata in D major, for clarinet and piano (1879) BV 138

^{v} Dieter Klöcker, clarinet; Werner Genuit, piano

Suite in G minor for clarinet and string quartet (1880) BV 176

^{v} Dieter Klöcker, clarinet; Consortium Classicum

Abendlied by Schumann, transcribed for clarinet and string quartet (1881) BV B 107

^{v} Dieter Klöcker, clarinet; Consortium Classicum

Introduction by Spohr, Elegia by H. W. Ernst, transcribed for clarinet and string quartet (1887) BV B 110

^{v} Dieter Klöcker, clarinet; Consortium Classicum

Elegie, for clarinet and piano (1920) BV 286

• Fredrik Fors, clarinet; Sveinung Bjelland, piano
^{v} Dieter Klöcker, clarinet; Werner Genuit, piano

==== Flute ====
Duo Op. 73, for 2 flutes and piano (1880) BV 156

^{v} Wolfgang Dünschede, 1st flute; Alexander Duisberg, 2nd flute; Werner Genuit, piano

=== Solo piano ===
Tema con Variazioni (in C major) Op. 6 (1873) BV 6

^{v} Wolf Harden, piano

Inno-Variato (Hymn with variations) Op. 12 (1875) BV 16

^{v} Wolf Harden, piano

Suite Campestre (Pastoral Suite), Op. 18 (1878) BV 81

^{v} Geoffrey Douglas Madge, piano

Racconti Fantastici (Fantastic Tales]), Op. 12 (1882) BV 100

^{v} Geoffrey Douglas Madge, piano

24 Préludes Op. 37 (1881) BV 181

^{v} Daniele Petralia, piano
^{v} Geoffrey Douglas Madge, piano
^{v} Trevor Barnard, piano
^{v} Wolf Harden, piano

Macchiette Medioevali (Medieval Figures), Op. 33 (1883) BV 194

^{v} Geoffrey Douglas Madge, piano
^{v} Wolf Harden, piano

Trois Morceaux (Three Pieces), Op. 4, 5, and 6 (1883?) BV 197

^{v} Wolf Harden, piano

Six études, Op. 16 (1883) BV 203

^{v} Wolf Harden, piano

Sonata in F minor, Op. 20 (1883) BV 204

^{v} Bruce Wolosoff, piano
^{v} Wolf Harden, piano

Étude en forme de variations, Op. 17 (1883?) BV 206

^{v} Wolf Harden, piano

Zweite Balletszene, Op. 20 (1884) BV 209

^{v} Wolf Harden, piano

Variations and Fugue on the Prelude in C minor, Op. 28, no. 20, by Frédéric Chopin (1884) BV 213

^{v} Geoffrey Douglas Madge, piano
^{v} Wolf Harden, piano

Zehn Variationen über ein Präludium von Chopin, for piano (1922): from Klavierübung in Ten Books (Second Edition): Book 8: Variations and Variants on Chopin: Neun Variationen über ein Präludium von Chopin, an altered version of Variationen und Fuge in freier Form über Fr. Chopin's C-moll Präludium (Op. 28 No. 20) Op. 22 (1884) BV 213a

^{v} J. Y. Song, piano
^{v} Geoffrey Douglas Madge, piano
^{v} Marc-André Hamelin, piano
^{v} Wolf Harden, piano
^{v} John Ogdon, piano
^{v} Jonathan Plowright, piano

Anhang zu Siegfried Ochs "Kommt a Vogerl g'flogen" (five variations) (1886?) BV 222

^{v} Wolf Harden, piano

Zwei Tanzstücke (Two Dance Pieces), Op. 30a (1914) BV 235a

^{v} Geoffrey Douglas Madge, piano
^{v} Wolf Harden, piano

Vierte Ballett-Szene (Fourth Ballet Scene), Op. 33a (1892) BV 238

^{v} Martin Jones, piano (LP; limited availability)
^{v} Geoffrey Douglas Madge, piano

Vierte Ballet-Szene (Walzer und Galopp) (Fourth Ballet Scene (Waltz and Gallop)) (1914) BV 238a

^{v} Wolf Harden, piano

6 Stücke (6 Pieces), Op. 33b (1895) BV 241

1. Schwermut (Melancoly)
2. Frohsinn (Gaiety)
3. Scherzino
4. Fantasia in modo antico
5. Finnische Ballade
6. Exeunt omnes [Everyone exits]

^{v} Geoffrey Douglas Madge, piano
^{v} Geoffrey Tozer, piano (No. 6, "Exeunt omnes" only)
^{v} Wolf Harden, piano

Elegien (1907) BV 249

(includes Berceuse (1909) 252 as No. 7)
1. Nach der Wendung
2. All' Italia! In modo napolitano
3. "Meine Seele bangt hofft zu Dir" Choralvorspiel
4. Turandots Frauengemach, Intermezzo
5. Die Nächtlichen, Walzer
6. Erscheinung, Notturno
7. Berceuse (BV 252)

Complete

^{v} Martin Jones, piano (LP; limited availability)
^{v} Roland Pöntinen, piano
^{v}Geoffrey Douglas Madge, piano
^{v} Wolf Harden. piani
^{v} Jeni Slotchiver, piano
^{v} David Wilde, piano
^{v} Bruce Wolosoff, piano
^{v} Marc-André Hamelin, piano
^{v} Sandro Ivo Bartoli, piano

Selected

^{v} Geoffrey Tozer, piano (No. 2. "All'Italia!" and No. 4. "Turandots Frauengemach" only)
^{v} Alfred Brendel, piano (No. 3. "Meine Seele bangt und hofft zu Dir" and No. 6. "Erscheinung")
^{v} Claudius Tanski, piano (No1. "Nach der Wendung" only)
^{v} Claudius Tanski, piano (No. 3 "Meine Seele bangt hofft zu Dir" Choralvorspiel, No. 4. Turandots Frauengemach, Intermezzo, No. 5. Die Nächtlichen, Walzer, No. 6. Erscheinung, Notturno, and No. 7. Berceuse (BV 252) only)
^{v} John Ogdon, piano (No. 4. Turandots Frauengemach, Intermezzo)

Nuit de Noël. Esquisse (Christmas. Sketch) (1908) BV 251

^{v} Geoffrey Douglas Madge, piano
^{v} Marc-André Hamelin, piano

Berceuse (1909) BV 252

^{v} Martin Jones, piano (LP; limited availability)
^{v} J. Y. Song, piano
^{v} Geoffrey Tozer, piano
^{v} Geoffrey Douglas Madge, piano
^{v} Jeni Slotchiver, piano
^{v} David Wilde, piano
^{v} Bruce Wolosoff, piano

Fantasy after J. S. Bach (1909) BV 253

^{v} J. Y. Song, piano
^{v} John Ogdon, piano
^{v} Geoffrey Tozer, piano
^{v} Geoffrey Douglas Madge, piano
^{v} Marc-André Hamelin, piano
^{v} Marc-André Hamelin, piano
^{v} Wolf Harden, piano
^{v} Jan Michiels, piano
^{v} Carlo Grante, piano

An die Jugend (To Youth) (1909) BV 254

1. Preludietto, Fughetta & Esercizio
2. Preludio, Fuga & Fuga figurata
3. Giga, Bolero & Variazione: Studie nach Mozart
4. Introduzione, Capriccio & Epilogo

^{v} Geoffrey Douglas Madge, piano
^{v} Wolf Harden, piano
^{v} Geoffrey Tozer, piano (Giga, Bolero e Variazione: Studie nach Mozart only)
^{v} Marc-André Hamelin, piano ("Giga, Bolero e Variazione: Studie nach Mozart only)
^{v} Holger Groschopp, piano ("Giga, Bolero e Variazione: Studie nach Mozart only)

Große Fuge (Great Fugue) (1910), BV 255

^{v} Holger Groschopp, piano

Fantasia Contrappuntistica, Edizione definitiva (1910) BV 256

^{v} John Ogdon, piano
^{v} Hamish Milne, piano
^{v} Viktoria Postnikova, piano
^{v} Geoffrey Douglas Madge, piano
^{v} Sandro Ivo Bartoli, piano
^{v} Wolf Harden, piano
^{v} Carlo Grante, piano
^{v} Jan Michiels, piano
^{v} Holger Groschopp, piano
^{v} Carlo Grante, piano

Fantasia Contrappuntistica, Edizione minore. Chorale Prelude and Fugue on a Fragment of Bach (1912) BV 256a

^{v} Geoffrey Douglas Madge, piano

Sonatina (No. 1) (1910) BV 257

^{v} Paul Jacobs, piano
^{v} Geoffrey Douglas Madge, piano
^{v} Jeni Slotchiver, piano
^{v} Roland Pöntinen, piano
^{v} Marc-André Hamelin, piano

Sonatina seconda, for piano (1912) BV 259

^{v} Paul Jacobs, piano
^{v} Geoffrey Tozer, piano
^{v} Jeni Slotchiver, piano
^{v} Geoffrey Douglas Madge, piano
^{v} Roland Pöntinen, piano
^{v} Marc-André Hamelin, piano
^{v} Olga Stezhko, piano

Floh-Sprung. Canon for two voices with obbligato bass (1914) BV 265

^{v} Holger Groschopp, piano

Indianisches Tagebuch. Erstes Buch (Red Indian Diary. First Book). (1915) BV 267

^{v} Geoffrey Tozer, piano
^{v} Jeni Slotchiver, piano
^{v} Geoffrey Douglas Madge, piano
^{v} Roland Pöntinen, piano
^{v} Marc-André Hamelin, piano
^{v} Carlo Grante, piano

Sonatina (No. 3) "ad usum infantis" (1915) BV 268

^{v} Geoffrey Douglas Madge, piano
^{v} Paul Jacobs, piano
^{v} Jeni Slotchiver, piano
^{v} Roland Pöntinen, piano
^{v} Marc-André Hamelin, piano
^{v} Thomas Adès, piano

Sonatina (No. 4) "in diem nativitatis Christi" (1917) BV 274

^{v} Geoffrey Douglas Madge, piano
^{v} Paul Jacobs, piano
^{v} Jeni Slotchiver, piano
^{v} Roland Pöntinen, piano
^{v} Marc-André Hamelin, piano

Notturni. Prologo (1918) BV 279

^{v} Geoffrey Douglas Madge, piano
^{v} Marc-André Hamelin, piano

Sonatina brevis (No. 5) "in signo Joannis Sebastiani Magni" (1918) BV 280

^{v} Geoffrey Douglas Madge, piano
^{v} Paul Jacobs, piano
^{v} Jeni Slotchiver, piano
^{v} Roland Pöntinen, piano
^{v} Marc-André Hamelin, piano

Sonatina No. 6 (Kammer-Fantasie über Carmen [Chamber Fantasy super Carmen]) (1920) BV 284

^{v} Geoffrey Tozer, piano
^{v} Geoffrey Douglas Madge, piano
^{v} Paul Jacobs, piano
^{v} Jeni Slotchiver, piano
^{v} Roland Pöntinen, piano
^{v} Marc-André Hamelin, piano
^{v} John Ogdon, piano
^{v} Holger Groschopp, piano
^{v} Carlo Grante, piano

Toccata: Preludio – Fantasia – Ciaconna (1921) BV 287

^{v} Geoffrey Tozer, piano
^{v} Geoffrey Douglas Madge, piano
^{v} John Ogdon, piano
^{v} Jeni Slotchiver, piano
^{v} Roland Pöntinen, piano
^{v} Alfred Brendel, piano
^{v} Marc-André Hamelin, piano
^{v} Wolf Harden, piano
^{v} Olga Stezhko, piano
^{v} Sofya Gulyak, piano

Tanzwalzer, Op. 53, for orchestra (1920), arr. for piano by Michael von Zadora (1882-1946) BV 288

^{v} Wolf Harden, piano

Drei Albumblätter (Three Album Leaves) (1921) BV 289

^{v} Geoffrey Douglas Madge, piano
^{v} Marc-André Hamelin, piano
^{v} Carlo Grante, piano

Perpetuum mobile (1922) BV 293

^{v} Geoffrey Douglas Madge, piano
^{v} Roland Pöntinen, piano
^{v} Marc-André Hamelin, piano
^{v} Carlo Grante, piano

Short Pieces for the Cultivation of Polyphonic Playing (1923): from Klavierübung in Ten Books (Second Edition): Book 9: BV 296

^{v} Geoffrey Douglas Madge, piano
^{v} Paul Jacobs, piano
^{v} Roland Pöntinen, piano
^{v} Marc-André Hamelin, piano
^{v} Holger Groschopp, piano (No. 5. Preludio: Andante tranquillo only)

Prélude et Etude en Arpèges (Prelude and Etude in Arpeggios) (1923) BV 297

^{v} Geoffrey Douglas Madge, piano
^{v} Roland Pöntinen, piano
^{v} Wolf Harden, piano
^{v} Marc-André Hamelin, piano
^{v} Carlo Grante, piano

Klavierübung in zehn Büchern, zweite umgestaltete und bereicherte Ausgabe. (Piano tutorial in ten books, second reorganized and enriched edition.) (1917-1924; second edition published 1925) List of compositions by Ferruccio Busoni, Appendix, No. 7

^{v} Marc-André Hamelin, piano

Zweites Buch. Von Tonleitern abgeleitete Formen (Book 2: Forms derived from scales):a:2: Preludio Allegro festivo
Fünftes Buch. Triller (Book 5: Trills):

(d) Preludio (without the third finger), Moderato alla breve
(i) Veloce e leggiero

Sechstes Buch. Lo Staccato (Book 6: Staccato):

(b) Vivace moderato, con precisione
(d) Variations-Studie nach Mozart, 1 (Serenade from Don Giovanni)
(e) Motive: Allegro risoluto
(j) Allegro

^{v} Carlo Grante, piano

Fünftes Buch. Triller (Book 5: Trills):

(i) Veloce e leggiero

=== Transcriptions ===
Bach: Prelude and Fugue in D major, BWV 532, tr. for piano (1888) BV B 20

^{v} Geoffrey Tozer, piano
^{v} Sandro Ivo Bartoli, piano
^{v} Wolf Harden, piano
^{v} Nikolai Demidenko, piano
^{v} Holger Groschopp, piano

Bach: Prelude and Fugue in E-flat major for organ (St. Anne), BWV 552, tr. for piano (1890?) BV B 22

^{v} Sandro Ivo Bartoli, piano
^{v} Wolf Harden, piano
^{v} Nikolai Demidenko, piano
^{v} Holger Groschopp, piano

Bach: Chaconne from Partita No. 2 in D minor for violin, BWV 1004, tr. for piano (1893) BV B 24

^{v} Jeni Slotchiver, piano
^{v} Sandro Ivo Bartoli, piano
^{v} Kun-Woo Paik, piano
^{v} Nikolai Demidenko, piano
^{v} Wolf Harden, piano
^{v} Dmitry Paperno, piano
^{v} Dmitry Paperno, piano
^{v} David Theodor Schmidt, piano
^{v} Mikhail Pletnev, piano
^{v} Mikhail Pletnev, piano
^{v} Tatiana Nikolayeva, piano
^{v} Shura Cherkassky, piano
^{v} Shura Cherkassky, piano
^{v} Alicia de Larrocha, piano
^{v} James Brawn, piano
^{v} Anna Gourari, piano
^{v} James Rhodes, piano
^{v} James Rhodes, piano
^{v} Hando Nahkur, piano
^{v} Roland Pöntinen, piano
^{v} Freddy Kempf, piano
^{v} Ferruccio Busoni, piano
^{v} Ferruccio Busoni, piano
^{v} Polina Leschenko, piano
^{v} Maurizio Baglini, piano
^{v} Johannes Jess-Kropfitsch, piano
^{v} Jeni Slotchiver, piano
^{v} Yakov Flier, piano
^{v} Christopher O'Riley, piano
^{v} Sequeira Costa, piano
^{v} Amadeus Guitar Duo, guitar duo
^{v} Rosalyn Tureck, piano
^{v} Rosalyn Tureck, piano
^{v} Peter Rösel, piano
^{v} Dudana Mazmanishvili, piano
^{v} Valery Kuleshov, piano
^{v} Valerie Tryon, piano
^{v} Boris Giltburg, piano
^{v} Sophie-Mayuko Vetter, piano
^{v} Holger Groschopp, piano
^{v} Benjamin Grosvenor, piano

Bach: The Well-Tempered Clavier, Parts I and II, BWV 846–893, transcribed for piano by Busoni (1894, 1915) BV B 25

^{v} Holger Groschopp, piano (Part 1, No. 1, Prelude and Fugue in C major, BWV 846 "Widmung"; No. 3, Prelude in C sharp Major, BWV 848; No. 21 Prelude in B flat Major, BWV 866)

Bach: Prelude and Fugue in E minor for organ, BWV 533, tr. for piano (1894) BV B 26

^{v} Sandro Ivo Bartoli, piano
^{v} Nikolai Demidenko, piano
^{v} Holger Groschopp, piano

Bach: Ten Chorale Preludes for Organ, tr. for piano (1898) BV B 27

1. Komm, Gott, Schöpfer, heiliger Geist, BWV 667
2. Wachet auf, ruft uns die Stimme, BWV 645
3. Nun komm' der Heiden Heiland, BWV 659
4. Nun freut euch, lieben Christen gmein, BWV 734a
5. Ich ruf' zu dir, Herr Jesu Christ, BW 639
6. Herr Gott, nun schleuß' den Himmel auf, BWV 617
7a. Durch Adam's Fall ist ganz verderbt, BWV 637
7b. Durch Adam's Fall ist ganz verderbt. Fuga, BWV 705 (doubtful authenticity)
8. In dir ist Freude, BWV 615
9. Jesus Christus, unser Heiland, BWV 665

Complete
^{v} Paul Jacobs, piano
^{v} Sandro Ivo Bartoli, piano
^{v} Kun-Woo Paik, piano
^{v} Chiara Bertoglio, piano
Selected

1. Komm, Gott, Schöpfer, heiliger Geist, BWV 667

^{v} Nikolai Demidenko, piano
^{v} Claudius Tanski, piano

2. Wachet auf, ruft uns die Stimme (Awake, the voice commands), BWV 645

^{v} John Buttrick, piano
^{v} Nikolai Demidenko, piano
^{v} Claudius Tanski, piano

3. Nun komm, der Heiden Heiland (Now comes, the Gentiles' Savior), BWV 659

^{v} John Buttrick, piano
^{v} Nikolai Demidenko, piano
^{v} Claudius Tanski, piano

4. Nun freut euch, lieben Christen gmein, BWV 734a

^{v} Nikolai Demidenko, piano
^{v} Jan Michiels, piano

5. Ich ruf' zu dir, Herr Jesu Christ, BW 639

^{v} Nikolai Demidenko, piano
^{v} Claudius Tanski, piano

6. Herr Gott, nun schleuß' den Himmel auf, BWV 617

^{v} Nikolai Demidenko, piano

7a. Durch Adam's Fall ist ganz verderbt, BWV 637

^{v} Nikolai Demidenko, piano
^{v} Jan Michiels, piano

7b. Durch Adam's Fall ist ganz verderbt. Fuga, BWV 705 (doubtful authenticity)

^{v} Nikolai Demidenko, piano
^{v} Jan Michiels, piano

8. In dir ist Freude, BWV 615

^{v} Nikolai Demidenko, piano
^{v} Jan Michiels, piano

9. Jesus Christus, unser Heiland, BWV 665

^{v} Nikolai Demidenko, piano
^{v} Holger Groschopp, piano

Bach: Two Toccatas and Fugues in C major and D minor for organ, BWV564, 565, tr. for piano (1899) BV B 29

^{v} Sandro Ivo Bartoli, piano
^{v} Nikolai Demidenko, piano

Toccata, Adagio and Fugue in C major, BWV 564 only

^{v} Wolf Harden, piano
^{v} Kun-Woo Paik, piano

Toccata and Fugue in D minor, BWV 565 only

^{v} Wolf Harden, piano

Toccata only.

^{v} Claudius Tanski, piano
^{v} Holger Groschopp, piano

Bach: Capriccio on the Departure of His Beloved Brother, in B-flat major for harpsichord, BWV 992, tr. for piano (1914) BV B 34

^{v} Nikolai Demidenko, piano
^{v} Holger Groschopp, piano

Bach: Goldberg Variations (Air with 30 Variations for harpsichord), BWV 988, ed. for piano (1914) BV B 35

^{v} Claudius Tanski, piano
^{v} Chiara Bertoglio, piano

Bach: Fantasia, Adagio and Fugue, BWV 906, 968, transcribed for piano (1914) BV B 37

^{v} Nikolai Demidenko, piano
^{v} Holger Groschopp, piano

Bach: Canonic Variations and Fugue from the "Musical Offering," BWV 1079, transcribed for piano by Busoni (1916) BV B 40

^{v} Holger Groschopp, piano

after Bach: Two Chorale Preludes (Das Calvarium), transcribed for piano by Busoni (fragments only - date unknown) BV B 46

^{v} Holger Groschopp, piano

Beethoven: Écossaises for piano, WoO 83, ed. for piano by Busoni (1888) BV B 47

^{v} Holger Groschopp, piano

Brahms: Six Chorale Preludes for Organ from Op. 122, tr. for piano (1902) BV B 50

^{v} Paul Jacobs, piano
^{v} Holger Groschopp, piano

Fantasie über Motive aus "Der Barbier von Bagdad" (Cornelius), composed for piano (1886) BV B 52

^{v} Wolf Harden, piano
^{v} Holger Groschopp, piano

Cramer: 8 Etudes de piano par JB Cramer choisies des 16 nouvelles études, Op 81, edited for piano by Busoni (1897), published that year, then reprinted with slight alterations as part of "Klavierübung in Five Parts" (First Edition): Part 4: Eight Etudes by Cramer (1921) and with further changes in "Klavierübung in Ten Books" (Second Edition): Book 7: Eight Etudes after Cramer (published posthumously 1925) BV B 53

^{v} Gianluca Luisi, piano

Concert Fantasy on Motives from "Merlin"|Trascrizione di concerto sopra motivi dell'opera Merlin (Goldmark), composed for piano (1887) BV B 55

^{v} Wolf Harden, piano

Liszt: Fantasy and Fugue on the Chorale 'Ad nos, ad salutarem undam', ed. for piano) (1897) BV B 59

^{v} Hamish Milne, piano
^{v} Sandro Ivo Bartoli, piano
^{v} Wolf Harden, piano
^{v} Holger Groschopp, piano

Liszt: Mephisto Waltz from Deux Épisodes d'apres le Faust de Lenau (S.110 no. 2) (Mephisto Waltz No. 2: "Der Tanz in der Dorfschenke"), ed. for piano (1904) BV B 61

^{v} Sandro Ivo Bartoli, piano
^{v} Holger Groschopp, piano

Liszt Fantasy on Two Motives from W. A. Mozart's "Le Nozze di Figaro" (S.697), completed by Busoni (1912) BV B 66

^{v} Holger Groschopp, piano

Liszt, Grandes études de Paganini, S141: Etude No. 6 (in A minor) after Paganini (S.141, no. 6), Tema e variazioni, ed. for piano (1923) BV B 67

^{v} Sandro Ivo Bartoli, piano

Liszt, Grandes études de Paganini, S141: Etude No. 3 "La Campanella" (in G-sharp minor) after Paganini (S.141, no. 3), ed. for piano (1915) BV B 68

^{v} Sandro Ivo Bartoli, piano

Liszt, Grandes études de Paganini, S141: Etude No. 2 (in E-flat major) after Paganini (S.141, no. 2), Andantino capriccioso, ed. for piano (1916) BV B 70

^{v} Sandro Ivo Bartoli, piano

Liszt, Hungarian Rhapsody No. 19, S623a, ed. for piano (1920) BV B 73

^{v} Sandro Ivo Bartoli, piano

Liszt, Grandes études de Paganini, S141: Etude No. 4 (in E major) after Paganini (S.141, no. 4), Arpeggio, ed. for piano (1921) BV B 74

^{v} Sandro Ivo Bartoli, piano

Liszt, Grandes études de Paganini, S141: Etude No. 1 (in G minor) after Paganini (S.141, no. 1), Tremolo, ed. for piano (1923) BV B 75

^{v} Sandro Ivo Bartoli, piano

Liszt, Grandes études de Paganini, S141: Etude No. 5 (in E major) after Paganini (S.141, no. 5) "La Chasse", ed. for piano (1923) BV B 76

^{v} Sandro Ivo Bartoli, piano

Mozart: Andantino from Piano Concerto No. 9 in E-flat major, K. 271, arr. Busoni) (1913) BV B 84

^{v} Hamish Milne, piano

Mozart: Adagio and Fugue in C Minor, K. 546, the fugue was partly transcribed for piano by Busoni (ca. 1888) and the entire transcription was completed by Groschopp BV B B94

^{v} Holger Groschopp, piano

Nováček: Scherzo from the String Quartet No. 1 in E minor, transcribed for piano by Busoni (1892) BV B 95

^{v} Holger Groschopp, piano

Schoenberg: Piano Piece, Op. 11, no. 2, (Massig), ed. for piano by Busoni (1909) BV B 97

^{v} Holger Groschopp, piano

Schubert Overture in E minor for Orchestra, D. 648 transcribed for piano by Busoni (1889) BV B 104

^{v} Holger Groschopp, piano

Wagner: "Siegfried's Funeral March" from "Götterdämmerung", tr. for piano (1883) BV B 111

^{v} Wolf Harden, piano
^{v} Holger Groschopp, piano

Klavierübung in 5 Parts: Part 2: Three Piano Tutorials and Preludes: VI Examples of "À trois mains": Nach Offenbach: Barcarolle from The Tales of Hoffmann, transcribed for piano by Busoni

^{v} Holger Groschopp, piano

Klavierübung in 5 Parts: Part 2: Three Piano Tutorials and Preludes: VII Trills: Liszt: Gondoliera, S.162 No. 1 from Venezia e Napoli, ed. for piano by Busoni

^{v} Holger Groschopp, piano

Klavierübung in 5 Parts: Part 3: Staccato: Variations-Studie nach Mozart No. 1 after Serenata from Don Giovanni (K.527), an altered version of the Giga e Variazione from Book 3 of An die Jugend BV B 254

^{v} Wolf Harden, piano
^{v} Holger Groschopp, piano

Klavierübung in 5 Parts: Part 3: Staccato: Nach Mendelssohn, Vivace assai (the Presto from the Mendelssohn-Liszt edition of the Wedding March and Elfin Chorus, S.410)

^{v} Holger Groschopp, piano

=== Songs ===
Des Sängers Fluch, Op. 39, for voice and piano (1879) BV 98

^{v} Martin Bruns, baritone; Ulrich Eisenlohr, piano

Zwei Lieder, Op. 31, for voice and piano (1880) BV 167

^{v} Martin Bruns, baritone; Ulrich Eisenlohr, piano

Zwei altdeutsche Lieder, Op. 18, for voice and piano (1884) BV 207

^{v} Martin Bruns, baritone; Ulrich Eisenlohr, piano

Album Vocale, Op. 30, for voice and piano (1884) BV 114

^{v} Martin Bruns, baritone; Ulrich Eisenlohr, piano

Zwei Lieder, Op. 15, for voice and piano (1884) BV 202

^{v} Martin Bruns, baritone; Ulrich Eisenlohr, piano

Zwei Lieder, Op. 24, for low voice and piano (1885) BV 216

^{v} Martin Bruns, baritone; Ulrich Eisenlohr, piano

Lied des Brander, for baritone and piano (1918) BV 299

^{v} Martin Bruns, baritone; Ulrich Eisenlohr, piano

Lied des Mephistopheles, Op. 49, no. 2, for baritone and piano (1918) BV 278a

^{v} Martin Bruns, baritone; Ulrich Eisenlohr, piano
^{v} Dietrich Fischer-Dieskau, baritone; Gerald Moore, piano

Lied des Unmuts, for baritone and piano (1918) BV 281

^{v} Martin Bruns, baritone; Ulrich Eisenlohr, piano
^{v} Dietrich Fischer-Dieskau, baritone; Gerald Moore, piano

Reminiscenza Rossiniana, for voice and piano (1923) BV A 5

^{v} Martin Bruns, baritone; Ulrich Eisenlohr, piano

Zigeunerlied, Op. 55, no. 2, baritone and piano (1923) BV 295a

^{v} Martin Bruns, baritone; Ulrich Eisenlohr, piano
^{v} Dietrich Fischer-Dieskau, baritone; Gerald Moore, piano

Schlechter Trost (1924) BV 298a

^{v} Martin Bruns, baritone; Ulrich Eisenlohr, piano
^{v} Dietrich Fischer-Dieskau, baritone; Gerald Moore, piano

=== Opera ===
Die Brautwahl (1911) BV 258

^{v} Orchestra and Chorus of RAI Turin; Fernando Previtali, conductor
^{v} Staatskapelle Berlin; Daniel Barenboim, conductor (omits ca. 1/3 of the score)

Arlecchino (1916) BV 270

^{v} Glyndebourne Festival Orchestra; Sir John Pritchard, conductor
^{v} Opéra de Lyon; Kent Nagano, conductor
^{v} Berlin Radio Symphony Orchestra; Gerd Albrecht, conductor

Turandot (1917) BV 273

^{v} Bern City Orchestra; Otto Ackermann, conductor
^{v} Opéra de Lyon; Kent Nagano, conductor
^{v} Berlin Radio Symphony Orchestra; Gerd Albrecht, conductor

Doktor Faust (1924, incomplete) BV 303

^{v} Dietrich Henschel (as Faust); Opéra de Lyon; Kent Nagano, conductor
^{v} Dietrich Fischer-Dieskau (as Faust); Bavarian RSO; Ferdinand Leitner, conductor
^{v} Thomas Hampson (as Faust); Zurich Opera; Philippe Jordan, conductor; (video recording)

== Recording details ==
=== Violin concerto ===
Bruch, Busoni, Strauss. Violin Concertos. Turban, Shambadal.

  - Contents:
    - Busoni: Violin Concerto in D major, Op. 35a (1897) BV 243
    - + Bruch: Violin Concerto No.2 in D minor, Op. 44
    - + Strauss: Violin Concerto in D minor, Op. 8
  - Performers: Ingolf Turban, violin; Bamberger Symphony; Lior Shambadal, conductor
  - Label: Claves Records CD 50-9318; released in 1993 (Claves prod. page.. Retrieved 25 May 2009.)
  - Reviews: Christopher Field in BBC Music Magazine (Online review.; retrieved 25 May 2009) awarded this recording 5/5 stars for performance and 5/5 stars for sound. The concerti "are given committed performances by Ingolf Turban, a young talent not short of either lyrical tone or dazzling virtuosity. Busoni's concerto is really the most interesting piece with its occasional parody of Beethoven and Brahms, its fiendishly difficult finale and some wonderful orchestral solos managed masterfully by the Bamberg Symphony Orchestra." Andrew Clements in The Guardian (Classical CD; retrieved 30 July 2014]) says, "...Frank Peter Zimmermann's neat, intelligent violin playing is a delight...".

Busoni: Violin Concerto; Violin Sonata. Zimmermann.

  - Contents:
    - Busoni: Violin Concerto in D major, Op. 35a (1897) BV 243
      - Performers: Frank Peter Zimmermann, violin; Orchestra Sinfonica Nazionale della RAI; John Storgårds, conductor
      - Recording date and location: 18 April 2003; "Auditorium Giovanni Agnelli" del Lingotto, Turin
    - Busoni: Violin Sonata No.2, Op. 36a (1900) BV 244
      - Performers: Frank Peter Zimmermann, violin; Enrico Pace, piano
      - Recording date and location: 10 October 2004; Bayerischer Rundfunk, Studio 1, Munich
  - Label: Sony SK 94497
  - Reviews: Recommended in the 2008 Gramophone Guide and the 2008 Penguin Guide

Busoni: Violin Concerto; Orchestral Works. Parikian, Horenstein.

  - Contents:
    - Busoni: Violin Concerto in D major, Op. 35a (1897) BV 243*
    - Busoni: Turandot Suite Op. 41 (1905, 1917) BV 248 (excerpts):
      - IV. "Turandot" Marsch.
      - VI. Tanz und Gesang.
      - VIII. "Altoums Warnung" e "Finale alla Turca" aus der Musik zum fünften Akt.
    - Busoni: Nocturne Symphonique Op. 43 (1913) BV 262
  - Performers: Manoug Parikian*, violin; Royal Philharmonic Orchestra; Jascha Horenstein, conductor
  - Recording date and location: 1973? or October 1966, Busoni Festival?
  - Label: Rococo RR 2036 (LP, limited availability)

Busoni: Violin Concerto; Violin Sonata. Szigeti, Scherman, Horszowski.

  - Contents:
    - Busoni: Violin Concerto in D major, Op. 35a (1897) BV 243
      - Performers: Joseph Szigeti, violin; The Little Orchestra; Thomas Scherman, conductor
      - Recording date and location: 22 December 1954
    - Busoni: Violin Sonata No. 2, Op. 36a (1900) BV 244
      - Performers: Joseph Szigeti, violin; Mieczyslaw Horszowski, piano
      - Recording date and location: 20, 21 & 26 February & 9 March 1956
  - Label: Sony SK 94497 (AllMusic prod. page. Retrieved 30 July 2014.)

=== Piano concerto ===
Busoni: Piano Concerto. Volker Banfield.

CPO 999 017-2

Recorded at Bavarian Radio, 1986; issued 1988.
Reviewed favorably by Michael Oliver in Gramophone, July, 1989.. Retrieved 20 June 2009.
This performance was awarded a Diapason d'Or.

Concerto for Piano & Orchestra (with Male Chorus), Op. 39 (1904) BV 247

Volker Banfield, piano
Bavarian Radio Symphony Orchestra; Lutz Herbig, conductor

Busoni: Piano Concerto. Peter Donohoe.

EMI CDC 7 49996 2

Recorded live at a BBC Henry Wood Promenade Concert at the Royal Albert Hall, London, 5 August 1988.
Reviewed by John Rockwell in The New York Times, 22 December 1991. Retrieved 7 November 2009.

Selects the Donohoe recording as his first choice among the seven performances available at the time the review was written. Ogdon was his second choice. Also reviews the recordings by Ohlsson, Battel, Lively, Thiollier, and Postnikova.

Reviewed by Michael Oliver in Gramophone, January 1991, p. 1371. Retrieved 7 November 2009.

Prefers Donohoe's recording to those by Banfield, Ohlsson, and Ogdon, although he thinks all are worthwhile. "Busoni's Piano Concerto is renowned for being the longest in the repertory but it hasn't struck me so forcibly before that it's not a minute longer than it needs to be. Its ideas are big—try timing any of its principal themes—and in this reading one is continually surprised, looking at a watch or the display on the CD player, at how much time has elapsed. The first movement, after all, is no more than an expansive exposition of two themes: does it really play for nearly 16 minutes? This performance has in Mark Elder a conductor accustomed, after his work on the English National Opera's Doktor Faust, to thinking on a Busonian time-scale. It was also recorded in the grand acoustic of the Royal Albert Hall in London during a Prom concert in 1988, and there is a distinct sense that the players are aware of a space around them that is big enough for the music."

Piano Concerto in C major, Op. 39 (1904) BV 247

Peter Donohoe, piano
BBC Symphony Orchestra; Mark Elder, conductor

Busoni: Piano Concerto. Marc-André Hamelin.

Hyperion CDA67143

Recorded Symphony Hall, Birmingham, 20 & 21 June 1999.
Recommended in 2008 Gramophone Guide
Recommended in 2008 Penguin Guide
Reviewed by Adrian Corleonis in Fanfare, 23:4 (Mar/Apr 2000). Subscription required. Retrieved 27 October 2009.

Considers Hamelin's recording to be of the same rank as John Ogdon's 1968 recording. Also mentions the Garrick Ohlsson recording and, especially the David Lively recording (with Michael Gielen conducting), as well worth hearing.

Piano Concerto in C major, Op. 39 (1904) BV 247

Marc-André Hamelin, piano
Men's voices of The City of Birmingham Symphony Chorus
The City of Birmingham Symphony Orchestra; Mark Elder, conductor

Busoni: Piano Concerto. Gunnar Johansen.

Music & Arts CD-1163 (Music & Arts prod. page. Retrieved 9 September 2009.)

Recorded live at the Hamburg Musikhalle on 15, 16 January 1956. (68:25) (mono)
Reviewed by Adrian Corleonis in Fanfare, 29:2 (Nov/Dec 2005). Subscription required. Retrieved 9 September 2009.

"Busoni's Piano Concerto is caught in a spontaneous sweep beginning to end, turning volatile in the inner flanking movements—Johansen's Tarantella may be the swiftest on discs. Despite the brisk pace, there is a profound resonance with the mystery of the central Pezzo serioso and the concluding Cantico.... Garlanded in tape hiss and captured in flat, boxy/tubby mono—not nearly as distracting to hear as to read about—this performance wings through a half-century with remarkable detail, balance, and clarity. The ear adjusts, caught by an irresistible élan. A prime document of Busoniana, then, but something more—a rare conjunction of genius under favoring stars."

Mentioned favorably in Gramophone, November 2005, p. 99.. Retrieved 9 September 2009.

"Busoni's Piano Concerto played by Gunnar Johansen is a major find, especially as Hans Schmidt-Isserstedt's conducting (NDR Symphony, NDR's Men's Chorus) is so consistently impressive, both artists at their best in the Pezzo serioso third movement. Music & Arts has effected a decent transfer from the 1956 tape..."

Concerto in C Major for Piano & Orchestra (with Male Chorus), Op. 39 (1904) BV 247

Gunnar Johansen, piano
Men's choir of the Norddeutschen Rundfunk [North German Radio]
NDR Symphony Orchestra; Hans Schmidt-Isserstedt, conductor

Busoni: Piano Concerto. David Lively.

Koch International CD 311 160 H1 (limited availability)

Recorded in Hans Rosbaud Studio, 8–13 February 1990; issued 1990.
Reviewed favorably by Michael Stewart in Gramophone, April, 1992, p 46.. Retrieved 23 June 2009.

Concerto for Piano & Orchestra with Male Choir in C major, Op. 39 (1904) BV 247

David Lively, piano
Freiburg Vocal Ensemble
SWF Symphony Orchestra Baden-Baden; Michael Gielen, conductor

Busoni: Piano Concerto. Pietro Massa.

GENUIN classics GEN 88122 (GENUIN prod. page. Retrieved 20 June 2009.)

Recorded live at the Concert Church Neubrandenburg on 19 January 2008; issued 2008.

Concerto for Piano & Orchestra with Male Choir in C major, Op. 39 (1904) BV 247

Pietro Massa, piano
Ernst Senff Choir Berlin; Philharmonic Choir Neubrandenburg
Neubrandenburg Philharmonic; Stefan Malzew, conductor

Busoni: Piano Concerto. Noel Mewton-Wood.

SOMM Recordings SOMM-BEECHAM 15 (1 CD, mono, 68:56, ADD) (SOMM prod. page. Retrieved 27 October 2009.)

Recorded at the BBC in Studio No. 1, London, in January 1948.
Reviewed by Adrian Corleonis in Fanfare, 27:3 (Jan/Feb 2004). Subscription required. Retrieved 27 October 2009.

"There are no interpretive revelations in this valiant but occasionally scrappy performance of an unfamiliar, demanding, briefly considered, and under-rehearsed work, likely given as an indulgence to the pianist. ... the soloist is deep in the background of a grainily tubby/shrill aural perspective beset by occasional distortion."

Piano Concerto Op. 39 (1904) BV 247

Noel Mewton-Wood, piano
BBC Symphony Orchestra, BBC Men's Chorus; Thomas Beecham, conductor

Busoni: Piano Concerto. John Ogdon.

EMI Classics 94637246726 (EMI Classics prod. page. Retrieved 15 April 2009.)

Recorded in 1967 (1989 digital remaster).
Review of the original 1968 LP release in Gramophone, January, 1968, p. 40. Retrieved 15 April 2009.
Comparative review of the Ogdon and Ohlsson recordings in Gramophone, April, 1990, p. 36. Retrieved 15 April 2009.

Piano Concerto Op. 39 (1904) BV 247

John Ogdon, piano
Royal Philharmonic Orchestra; Daniell Revenaugh, conductor

Busoni. Piano Concerto. Turandot Suite. Sarabande and Cortège. John Ogdon, Thomas Adès and others.

EMI Classics 4 56324 2 (Warner Classics prod. page.. Retrieved 19 August 2014.

David Gutman, sleevenotes, 2010.

Piano Concerto in C major, Op. 39 (1901-03, 1904) BV 247

Recorded Studio No. 1, Abbey Road, London, UK, 20-22, 26 & 28 July 1967.
Suvi Raj Grubb, producer; Christopher Parker, balance engineer.
John Ogdon, piano
Men's voices of the John Alldis Choir; Royal Philharmonic Orchestra; Daniell Revenaugh, conductor.

+Busoni: Turandot Suite, Op. 42, BV 248 (1904): Orchestra Filarmonica della Scala; Riccardo Muti, conductor.
+Busoni: Berceuse élégiaque, Op. 42 BV 252a (1909): New Philharmonia Orchestra; Frederik Prausnitz, conductor.
+Busoni: Sarabande und Cortège, Op. 51. Two studies for Doktor Faust, (Fifth and Sixth Elegies for Orchestra), BV 282 (1918-19): Royal Philharmonic Orchestra; Daniell Revenaugh, conductor.
+Busoni: Elegien. 7 neue Klavierstücke, BV 249 (1907), No. 4. Turandots Frauengemach (Intermezzo): John Ogdon, piano
+Busoni: Kammer-Fantasie über Carmen (Chamber Fantasy after Carmen) (Sonatina no. 6), BV 284 (1920): John Ogdon, piano
+Busoni: Zehn Variationen über ein Präludium von Chopin, BV 213a (1884 rev. 1922): John Ogdon, piano
+Busoni: Sonatina (no. 3) "ad usum infantis", BV 268 (1915): Thomas Adès, piano

Busoni: Piano Concerto. Garrick Ohlsson.

Telarc 80207 (Concord Music Group prod. page. Retrieved 15 April 2009.)

Recorded Masonic Auditorium, Cleveland, Ohio, 4 February 1989.
Recommended in 1996 Penguin Guide.

Recording received 3 of 3 stars and high praise for the playing of Ohlsson: "Garrick Ohlsson's bravura display is very exciting, and the pianist's own enjoyment in virtuosity enhances his electricity..."

Comparative review of the Ogdon and Ohlsson recordings in Gramophone, April, 1990, p. 36. Retrieved 15 April 2009.

Concerto in C Major for Piano & Orchestra (with Male Chorus), Op. 39 (1904) BV 247

Garrick Ohlsson, piano
The Cleveland Orchestra & Men's Chorus; Christoph von Dohnányi, conductor

Busoni: Piano Concerto. Viktoria Postnikova.

Apex (Warner Classics) 2564 64390-2 (2 CDs) (Warner Classics prod. page. Retrieved 20 June 2009.)

Piano Concerto recorded Studio 103, Radio France, February 1989.
Fantasia contrappuntistica recorded Salle Adyar, Paris, September 1990.
Originally issued as Erato 2292-45478-2, 1991; reissued on Apex, 2 August 2007.
Review of the original Erato release by Michael Stewart in Gramophone, April, 1992, p. 46. Retrieved 20 June 2009.

Notes the unusually slow tempi for both pieces. Although the playing by Postnikova and the orchestra in the concerto are outstanding, he finds that "ultimately [the interpretation] fails to convince." Goes on to say of the Fantasia contrappuntistica, that as fine as Postnikova is, "Ogdon's account is one of the finest committed to disc, and is a compulsory purchase for any discerning Busoni admirer."

Concerto for Piano & Orchestra, Op. 39 (1904) BV 247*
Fantasia Contrappuntistica (1910) BV 256

Viktoria Postnikova, piano
Orchestre National de France; Gennadi Rozhdestvensky, conductor*

Busoni: Piano Concerto. François-Joël Thiollier.

Kontrapunkt 32057 (Kontrapunkt prod. page Retrieved 20 June 2009.)

Recorded May 1990; issued 1990.

Concerto for Piano & Orchestra with Men's Chorus, Op. 39 (1904) BV 247

François-Joël Thiollier, piano
Nice Philharmonic Orchestra; Michael Schønwandt, conductor

=== Other soloist with orchestra ===
Ferruccio Busoni. Works for Piano and Orchestra. Carlo Grante

Music & Arts CD-1047 (Music & Arts prod. page. Retrieved 15 April 2009.)

Recording issued 1999.

Concerto for piano and string quartet Op. 17 (1878) BV 80
Concertstück [Concert Piece] for piano and orchestra Op. 31a (1890) BV 236
Indianische Fantasie [Indian Fantasy] for piano and orchestra Op. 44, (1914) BV 264

Carlo Grante, piano
Il Pomeriggi Musicali; Marco Zuccarini, conductor

=== Orchestral works ===
Ferruccio Busoni: Orchestral Works. Werner Andreas Albert.

CPO Records 999 161-2

Recorded Jun 1992. Co-production with Norddeutscher Rundfunk.

Eine Lustspielouvertüre [Comedy Overture] (1904) BV 245
Tanzwalzer [Dance Waltzes], Op. 53 (1920) BV 288
Rondò Arlecchinesco Op. 46 (1915) BV 266
Nocturne Symphonique Op. 43 (1913) BV 262
Berceuse élégiaque for orchestra, Op. 42 (1909) BV 252a
Gesang vom Reigen der Geister [Song of the Dance of the Spirits], Op. 47 (1915) BV 269

NDR Symphony Orchestra; Werner Andreas Albert, conductor

Ferruccio Busoni: Orchestral Works, Volume I. Gerd Albrecht.

Capriccio 10 479

Recorded Jesus-Christus Kirche, Berlin, Dahlem, 4–8 December 1991; 2–4 and 21–25 January 1992; issued 1993.
Reviewed favorably by Michael Stewart in Gramophone, June, 1994.. Retrieved 20 June 2009..
For volume II in this series, see Capriccio 10 480.
Reissued as part of a 4-CD collection of works by Busoni, Capriccio C49576 (Naxos prod. page.. Retrieved 20 June 2009.)

Verzweiflung und Ergebung [Despair and Resignation] (addition to Turandot Suite) (1911) BV 248a
Nocturne Symphonique Op. 43 (1913) BV 262
• "Orchestral Suite, Op. 46" (arr. Albrecht)

Consists of:
Rondò Arlecchinesco Op. 46 (1915) BV 266*
+ Processione e Danza and Finale (Presto) from the conclusion of the opera Arlecchino BV 270

Divertimento for flute and orchestra, Op. 52 (1920) BV 285**
Sarabande and Cortège, Op. 51 (1919) BV 282
Concertino for Clarinet and Small Orchestra, Op. 48 (1918) BV 276***
Tanzwalzer [Dance Waltzes], Op. 53 (1920) BV 288

Robert Wörle, tenor*
Jean Claude Gérard, flute**
Ulf Rodenhäuser, clarinet***
Berlin Radio Symphony Orchestra; Gerd Albrecht, conductor

Busoni: Orchestral Works • Jean-François Antonioli.

Timpani 1C1054 (1 CD, DDD, 64 min)

Recorded Salle Ion Vidu, Timișoara, September 1998; released 1999.
Reviewed by Michael Oliver in Gramophone, May 2000, p. 54. Retrieved 31 October 2009.

"In short, the two suites make a very worthwhile coupling. I had not heard the Timișoara Philharmonic Orchestra before, nor Jean-François Antonioli as a conductor (he has a fine reputation as a pianist). They are first-class, and he has an acute ear for Busoni's orchestral sonority. The recording is rich and colourful."

Die Brautwahl Suite, Op. 45 (1912) BV 261
Geharnischte Suite [Armored Suite] Op. 34a (Second Orchestral Suite) (1895, 1903) BV 242

Timișoara Banatul Philharmonic; Jean-François Antonioli, conductor

Busoni: Orchestral Works. Michael Gielen.

MMG (Moss Music Group) MCD 10019

Recorded 7 October 1983; 5 April 1983; Marc Aubort & Joanna Nickrenz, producers; issued 1984.

Turandot Suite Op. 41 (1905, rev. 1911) BV 248*
Verzweiflung und Ergebung [Despair and Resignation] (addition to Turandot Suite) (1911) BV 248a

Included between nos. 7 and 8 of the Turandot Suite.

Two Studies for "Doktor Faust": Sarabande and Cortège, Op. 51 (1919) BV 282

Women of the May Festival Chorus*
Cincinnati Symphony Orchestra; Michael Gielen, conductor

Ferruccio Busoni. The Classical Society.

The Classical Society CSCD 124 (1 CD, ADD, 65:44)

Issued 1991. (Made in Italy)

Berceuse élégiaque, Op. 42 (1909) BV 252a

BBC Symphony Orchestra; Michael Gielen, conductor
Recorded live in stereo, March 1970.

Canto della Ronda degli Spiriti [Song of the Dance of the Spirits], Op. 47 (1915) BV 269

Haydn Orchestra; Harry Newstone, conductor
Recorded in monophonic sound.

Lustspiel Overture, Op. 38 (1904) BV 245

Philharmonia Orchestra; Adrian Boult, conductor
Recorded live in mono at the Royal Festival Hall, London.

Four Goethe Songs for Baritone and Piano

Lied des Unmuts (1918) BV 281
Zigeunerlied, Op. 55, no. 2 (1923) BV 295a
Schlechter Trost (1924) BV 298a
Lied des Mephistopheles, Op. 49, no. 2 (1918) BV 278a

Dietrich Fischer-Dieskau, baritone; Gerald Moore, piano
Recorded live in monophonic sound.

Violin Concerto in D major, Op. 35a (1897) BV 243

Jaime Laredo, violin
BBC Symphony Orchestra; Daniel Barenboim, conductor
Recorded live in stereo in London, March 1972.

Rondò Arlecchinesco Op. 46 (1915) BV 266

Robert Tear, tenor
BBC Symphony Orchestra; Aaron Copland, conductor
Recorded live in monophonic sound.

Busoni Orchestral Works. Järvi

Chandos 9920 (Chandos prod. page. Retrieved 9 February 2009.)

Recorded Studio 7, New Broadcasting House, Manchester, 8 & 9 March 2001.
Recommended in 2008 Penguin Guide

Geharnischte Suite [Armored Suite] Op. 34a (Second Orchestral Suite) (1895, 1903) BV 242
Berceuse élégiaque, Op. 42 (1909) BV 252a
Concertino for Clarinet and Small Orchestra, Op. 48 (1918) BV 276*
Sarabande and Cortège, Op. 51 (1919) BV 282
Tanzwalzer, Op. 53 (1920) BV 288

John Bradbury, clarinet*
BBC Philharmonic; Neeme Järvi, conductor

Busoni Orchestral Works, Volume 2. Neeme Järvi.

Chandos 10302 (Chandos prod. page. Retrieved 9 February 2009.)

Recorded Studio 7, New Broadcasting House, Manchester, 24 & 25 March 2004.
Recommended in 2008 Penguin Guide

Lustspiel-Ouvertüre, Op. 38 (1904) BV 245
Indianische Fantasie, Op. 44, (1914) BV 264*
Gesang von Reigen der Geister, Op. 47 (1915) BV 269
Die Brautwahl Suite, Op. 45 (1912) BV 261

Nelson Goener, piano*
BBC Philharmonic; Neeme Järvi, conductor

Busoni, Casella, Martucci. Orchestral Works. Riccardo Muti.

Sony Classical SK 53280

Recorded Teatro Abanella. Milan, Italy, 2–5 October & 14 December 1992; issued 1993.
David Mottley, producer; Marcus Herzog, engineer.

+Casella: Paganiniana, Op. 65
+Martucci: Notturno, Op. 70, No. 1
+Martucci: Novelletta, Op. 82
+Martucci: Giga, Op. 61, No. 3
Turandot Suite Op. 41 (1905) BV 248

Nos. 4 & 6 of the original eight movements of the 1905 version are omitted.
Philharmonic Orchestra of La Scala; Riccardo Muti, conductor

Busoni. Orchestral Works, Volume II. Arturo Tamayo.

Capriccio 10 480

Coproduction RIAS-Berlin & Capriccio; issued 1993.
For volume I in this series, see Capriccio 10 479.
Reissued as part of a 4-CD collection of works by Busoni, Capriccio C49576 (Naxos prod. page.. Retrieved 16 December 2009.)

Lustspiel-Ouvertüre, Op. 38 (1904) BV 245
Symphonische Suite Op. 25 (1883) BV 201
Berceuse élégiaque, Op. 42 (1909) BV 252a
Gesang von Reigen der Geister, Op. 47 (1915) BV 269

Berlin Radio Symphony Orchestra; Arturo Tamayo, conductor

Busoni: Turandot Suite / 2 Studies for Doktor Faust. Samuel Wong.

Naxos 8.555373 (Naxos prod. page Accessed Feb 2009.)

Recording issued Mar 2002.
Recommended in 2008 Gramophone Guide
Recommended in 2008 Penguin Guide

Turandot Suite Op. 41 (1905) BV 248
Sarabande and Cortège, Op. 51 (1919) BV 282
Berceuse élégiaque, Op. 42 (1909) BV BV 222a

Hong Kong Philharmonic Orchestra; Samuel Wong, conductor

Busoni. Piano Concerto. Turandot Suite. Sarabande and Cortège. John Ogdon, Thomas Adès and others.

EMI Classics 4 56324 2 (Warner Classics prod. page.. Retrieved 19 August 2014.

David Gutman, sleevenotes, 2010.

Turandot Suite, Op. 42 (1904)

Orchestra Filarmonica della Scala; Riccardo Muti, conductor.
Recorded Teatro Abanella, Milan, Italy, 2 May & 14 December 1992.
David Mottley, producer; Marcus Herzog, balance engineer; for Sony Classical GmbH.

Berceuse élégiaque, Op. 42 BV (1909) BV 252a

New Philharmonia Orchestra; Frederik Prausnitz, conductor.
Recorded No. 1 Studio, Abbey Road, London, UK, 18–20 September 1967.
Christopher Bishop, producer; Christopher Parker, balance.

Sarabande und Cortège, Op. 51. Two studies for Doktor Faust, (Fifth and Sixth Elegies for Orchestra) (1918-19) BV 282

Recorded No. 1 Studio, Abbey Road, London, UK, 29 June 1967.
Suvi Raj Grubb, producer; Christopher Parker, balance engineer.

+Busoni: Piano Concerto in C major, Op. 39, BV 247 (1901-03, 1904): John Ogdon, piano; Men's voices of the John Alldis Choir; Royal Philharmonic Orchestra; Daniell Revenaugh, conductor.
+Busoni: Elegien. 7 neue Klavierstücke, BV 249 (1907), No. 4. Turandots Frauengemach (Intermezzo): John Ogdon, piano
+Busoni: Kammer-Fantasie über Carmen (Chamber Fantasy after Carmen) (Sonatina no. 6), BV 284 (1920): John Ogdon, piano
+Busoni: Zehn Variationen über ein Präludium von Chopin, BV 213a (1884 rev. 1922): John Ogdon, piano
+Busoni: Sonatina (no. 3) "ad usum infantis", BV 268 (1915): Thomas Adès, piano

=== Violin sonatas ===
Ferruccio Busoni. Violin Sonatas. Joseph Lin, Benjamin Loeb.

Naxos 8.557848 (Naxos prod. page. Retrieved 23 May 2009.)

Recorded at The Country Day School, Ontario, Canada, 1–4 August 2005.
Reviewed by Music Teacher International (quoted by Naxos):

"Violinist Joseph Lin won first prize at the inaugural Michael Hill World Violin Competition in New Zealand in 2001, appears on concert stages worldwide and is currently Professor of Violin at Cornell University. His partnership with acclaimed pianist Benjamin Loeb is exceptional and the recording is clear and well-focused."

Violin Sonata No. 1, Op. 29 (1889) BV 234
Violin Sonata No. 2, Op. 36a (1900) BV 244
Four Bagatelles, Op. 28 (1888) BV 229

Joseph Lin, violin; Benjamin Loeb, piano

Ferruccio Busoni. Violin Sonatas. Lev, Raekallio.

Finlandia 2564 61078-2

Recorded Kuusaa Hall, Kuusankoski, Finland, 28–30 July 2003.
Recommended in 2008 Penguin Guide

Violin Sonata in C (1876) BV 41
Violin Sonata No. 1, Op. 29 (1889) BV 234
Violin Sonata No. 2, Op. 36a (1900) BV 244

Lara Lev, violin; Matti Raekallio, piano

Busoni: Violin Concerto; Violin Sonata. Szigeti, Scherman, Horszowski.

  - Label: Sony SK 94497 (AllMusic prod.page. Retrieved 30 July 2014.)

Violin Sonata No. 2, Op. 36a (1900) BV 244

Recorded 20, 21 & 26 February & 9 March 1956
Joseph Szigeti, violin; Mieczyslaw Horszowski, piano

+ Violin Concerto in D major, Op. 35a (1897) BV 243

Recorded 22 December 1954

Joseph Szigeti, violin; The Little Orchestra; Thomas Scherman, conductor

=== String quartets ===
Ferruccio Busoni. String Quartets 1 & 2. Pellegrini-Quartett.

CPO Records 999 264-2

Recorded Funkhaus, Nalepastraße, 27–30 September 1994.
Reviewed favorably in Gramophone, January, 1996, p.69. Retrieved 17 March 2009.

String Quartet No. 1 in C major, Op. 19, (1882) BV 208
String Quartet No. 2 in D minor, Op. 26, (1887) BV 225

Pellegrini-Quartett: Antonio Pellegrini, violin; Thomas Hofer, violin; Charlotte Geselbracht, viola; Helmut Menzler, cello

=== Other chamber music ===
Busoni: Clarinet Chamber Music. Klöcker, Genuit.

CPO Records 999 264-2

Recorded 22–23 February and 12–15 December 1994; issued 1997.
Reviewed by Tim Payne in BBC Music Magazine, online.. Retrieved 22 June 2009.

Received 5/5 stars for sound and 3/5 stars for performance. "Anyone interested in discovering the work of Ferruccio Busoni would find this disc ideal."

Suite in G minor for clarinet and string quartet (1880) BV 176
Introduction by Spohr, Elegia by H. W. Ernst, transcribed for clarinet and string quartet (1887) BV B 110
Abendlied by Schumann, transcribed for clarinet and string quartet (1881) BV B 107
• 8 Character Pieces for Clarinet and Piano:

Solo dramatique, Op. 13, for clarinet and piano (1879) BV 101
Suite Op. 10, no. 6, Serenata for clarinet and piano (1878) BV 88
Andantino Op. 41, for clarinet and piano (1879) BV 107
Serenade no.2 Op. 42, for clarinet and piano (1879) BV 108
Suite Op. 10, no. 5, Tema variato for clarinet and piano (1878) BV 88
Suite Op. 10, no. 1, Improvvisata for clarinet and piano (1878) BV 88
Suite Op. 10, no. 2, Barcarola for clarinet and piano (1878) BV 88
Suite Op. 10, no. 4, Danza campestre for clarinet and piano (1878) BV 88

Elegie, for clarinet and piano (1920) BV 286
Sonata in D major, for clarinet and piano (1879) BV 138
Duo Op. 73, for 2 flutes and piano (1880) BV 156

Consortium Classicum: Dieter Klöcker, clarinet; Werner Genuit, piano; Andreas Krecher, 1st violin; Gerdur Gunnarsdottir, 2nd violin; Christiane Hörr, viola; Martin Menking, cello; Wolfgang Dünschede, 1st flute; Alexander Duisberg, 2nd flute

=== Piano two hands ===
Paul Jacobs: The Legendary Busoni Recordings & Works by Bach, Bartók, Brahms, Messiaen, Stravinsky.

Arbiter Records 124 (Arbiter catalog page. Retrieved 2 May 2009.)
Digital reissue in 2000 (2 CDs) of analog recordings originally issued by Nonesuch Records on LP.

CD 1:
LP 1: "20th-Century Piano Études" (Nonesuch LP H71334)

Recorded New York, USA, 26–28 April 1976.
Review of the original Nonesuch LP by Max Harrison in Gramophone, March 1977, pp. 1430, 1437. (Retrieved 2 May 2009.)

6 Short Pieces for the Cultivation of Polyphonic Playing (1923) BV 296

+ Stravinsky: Four Études, Op. 7 (1908)
+ Bartók: Three Études, Op. 18, sz. 72 (1918)
+ Messiaen: Quatre Études de rythme (1949-50)
Paul Jacobs, piano

LP 2: "Busoni: The Six Sonatinas" (Nonesuch LP H71359)

Recorded New York, June 1978.
Review of the original Nonesuch LP by Michael Oliver in Gramophone, October 1979, pp. 672, 675. (Retrieved 2 May 2009.)

Sonatina (No. 1) (1910) BV 257
Sonatina seconda (1912) BV 259

Paul Jacobs, piano

CD 2:
LP 2: "Busoni: The Six Sonatinas" (Nonesuch LP H71359) [continuation]
Sonatina (No. 3) "ad usum infantis" (1915) BV 268
Sonatina (No. 4) "in diem nativitatis Christi" (1917) BV 274
Sonatina brevis (No. 5) "in signo Joannis Sebastiani Magni" (1918) BV 280
Sonatina No. 6 (Sonatina super Carmen]) (1920) BV 284

Paul Jacobs, piano

LP 3: "Chorale Preludes by Bach & Brahms" (Nonesuch LP H71375)

Recorded New York, June 1979.

Bach: Ten Chorale Preludes for Organ, transcribed for piano by Busoni (1898) BV B 27

1. Komm, Gott, Schöpfer! [Come God, Creator!], BWV 667
2. Wachet auf, ruft uns die Stimme (Awake, the voice commands), BWV 645
3. Nun komm, der Heiden Heiland (Now comes, the Gentiles' Savior), BWV 659
4. Nun freut euch, lieben Christen (Rejoice, beloved Christians), BWV 734
5. Ich ruf' zu dir, Herr Jesu Christ (I call to Thee, Lord Jesus Christ), BWV 639
6. Herr Gott, nun schleuß den Himmel auf (Lord God, heaven's gate unlock!), BWV 617
7a. Durch Adams Fall ist ganz verderbt (Through Adam came our fall), BWV 637
7b. Durch Adams Fall ist ganz verderbt. Fuga. (2nd version), BWV 705
8. In dir ist Freude (In Thee is joy), BWV 615
9. Jesus Christus, unser Heiland (Jesus Christ, our Savior), BWV 665

Brahms: Six Chorale Preludes for Organ, from Op. 122, transcribed for piano by Busoni (1902) BV B 50

No. 4: Herzlich thut mich erfreuen (My inmost heart rejoiced)
No. 5: Schmücke dich, o Liebe Seele (Deck thyself out, o my soul)
No. 8: Es ist ein Ros' entsprungen (A rose breaks into bloom)
No. 9: Herzlich tut mich verlangen (My inmost heart doth yearn)
No. 10: Herzlich tut mich verlangen (My inmost heart doth yearn)
No. 11: O Welt, ich muss dich lassen (O world, I e'en must leave thee)

Paul Jacobs, piano

Bach/Busoni. Kun-Woo Paik.

Decca 467 358-2 (Decca prod. page. Retrieved 25 July 2014.)

Andrew Cornall executive & recording producer; Philip Siney, balance engineer; Modus Music Ltd, recording & editing facilities; Nicky Claydon, production coordinator; Steinway & Sons, London, piano; Tim Parry, sleevenotes.
Recorded at Potton Hall, Dunwich, Suffolk, UK, on 28–30 June 2000; issued 12 February 2001.

Bach: Two Toccatas and Fugues in C major and D minor for organ, BWV 564, 565 transcribed for piano by Busoni (1899) BV B 29

1. Toccata, Adagio and Fugue in C major, BWV 564

Bach: Ten Chorale Preludes for Organ, transcribed for piano by Busoni (1898) BV B 27

1. Komm, Gott, Schöpfer! (Come God, Creator!, BWV 667
2. Wachet auf, ruft uns die Stimme (Awake, the voice commands), BWV 645
3. Nun komm, der Heiden Heiland (Now comes, the Gentiles' Savior), BWV 659
4. Nun freut euch, lieben Christen (Rejoice, beloved Christians), BWV 734
5. Ich ruf' zu dir, Herr Jesu Christ (I call to Thee, Lord Jesus Christ), BWV 639
6. Herr Gott, nun schleuß den Himmel auf (Lord God, heaven's gate unlock!), BWV 617
7. Durch Adams Fall ist ganz verderbt (Through Adam came our fall), BWV 637
8. Durch Adams Fall ist ganz verderbt. Fuga. (2nd version), BWV 705
9. In dir ist Freude (In Thee is joy), BWV 615
10. Jesus Christus, unser Heiland (Jesus Christ, our Savior), BWV 665

Bach: Chaconne from Partita No. 2 in D minor for violin, BWV 1004 transcribed for piano by Busoni (1893) BV B 24

Kun-Woo Paik, piano

Busoni: Demidenko plays Bach-Busoni. Nikolai Demidenko.

Hyperion CDA66566

Tony Faulkner, recording engineer; Ateş Orga, recording producer; Joanna Gamble & Michael Spring, executive producers; Steinway, piano; Ateş Orga & Nikolai Demidenko, sleevenotes.
Recorded in St. Martin's Church, East Woodhay, Berkshire (sic.), UK, on 27 and 28 August 1991; issued January 1992.

Bach: Two Toccatas and Fugues in C major and D minor for organ, BWV 564, 565 transcribed for piano by Busoni (1899) BV B 29

1. Toccata, Adagio and Fugue in C major, BWV 564
2. Toccata and Fugue in D minor, BWV 565

Bach: Ten Chorale Preludes for Organ, transcribed for piano by Busoni (1898) BV B 27

3. Nun komm, der Heiden Heiland (Now comes, the Gentiles' Savior), BWV 659
4. Nun freut euch, lieben Christen (Rejoice, beloved Christians), BWV 734
5. Ich ruf' zu dir, Herr Jesu Christ (I call to Thee, Lord Jesus Christ), BWV 639

Bach: Capriccio on the Departure of His Beloved Brother, in B-flat major for harpsichord, BWV 992, transcribed for piano by Busoni (1914) BV B 34
Bach: Prelude and Fugue in E-flat major for organ (St. Anne), BWV 552, transcribed for piano by Busoni (1890?) BV B 22

Nikolai Demidenko, piano

Bach Piano Transcriptions-2. Busoni. Nikolai Demidenko.

Hyperion CDA67324

Ken Blair, recording engineer; Eric Smith, recording producer; Simon Perry & Michael Spring, executive producers; Fazioli, piano; Tim Parry, booklet editor; Charles Hopkins, sleevenotes.
Recorded in Forde Abbey, Somerset, UK, on 27 – 29 August 2001; issued February 2002.

Bach: Fantasia, Adagio and Fugue, BWV 906, 968, transcribed for piano by Busoni (1914) BV B 37

Fantasia, (Movement 1 of Fantasia in C minor, BWV 906)
Adagio (after Movement 1 of Sonata No. 3 for solo violin, BWV 1005)
Fugue (Incomplete Movement 2 of Fantasia in C minor, BWV 906 - completed by Busoni)

Bach: Ten Chorale Preludes for Organ, transcribed for piano by Busoni (1898) BV B 27

1. Komm, Gott, Schöpfer! (Come God, Creator!, BWV 667
2. Wachet auf, ruft uns die Stimme (Awake, the voice commands), BWV 645
6. Herr Gott, nun schleuß den Himmel auf (Lord God, heaven's gate unlock!), BWV 617
7. Durch Adams Fall ist ganz verderbt (Through Adam came our fall), BWV 637
8. Durch Adams Fall ist ganz verderbt. Fuga. (2nd version), BWV 705
9. In dir ist Freude (In Thee is joy), BWV 615
10. Jesus Christus, unser Heiland (Jesus Christ, our Savior), BWV 665

Bach: Prelude and Fugue in E minor for organ, BWV 533 transcribed for piano by Busoni (1894) BV B 26
Bach: Prelude and Fugue in D major for organ, BWV 532 transcribed for piano by Busoni (1888) BV B 20
Bach: Chaconne from Partita No. 2 in D minor for violin, BWV 1004 transcribed for piano by Busoni (1893) BV B 24

Nikolai Demidenko, piano

Busoni: Piano Music, Vol. 1. Wolf Harden.

Naxos 8.555034 (Naxos.com prod. page. Retrieved 20 July 2014.)

John Taylor, producer and engineer; Richard Whitehouse, music notes.
Recorded in St. Martin's Church, East Woodhay, Hampshire, UK, on 17 and 18 February 2000; issued March 2001.
Reviewed by Adrian Corleonis in Fanfare 25:1 (Sept/Oct 2001).. Subscription required. Retrieved 30 July 2014.

Bach: Toccata and Fugue in D minor, BWV 565, transcribed for piano by Busoni (1899) BV B 29
An die Jugend (1909) BV 254
Fantasia contrappuntistica, edizione definitiva (1910) BV 256

Wolf Harden, piano

Busoni: Piano Music, Vol. 2. Wolf Harden.

Naxos 8.555699 (Naxos.com prod. page. Retrieved 20 July 2014.)

John Taylor, producer and engineer; Richard Whitehouse, music notes.
Recorded in St. Martin's Church, East Woodhay, Hampshire, UK, on 21 and 22 September 2000; issued October 2001.
Reviewed by Adrian Corleonis in Fanfare 25:5 (May/June 2002). Subscription required. Retrieved 30 July 2014.

Bach: Chaconne from Partita No. 2 in D minor for violin, BWV 1004, transcribed for piano by Busoni (1893) BV B 24
Étude en forme de variations Op. 17 (1883) BV 206
Anhang zu Siegfried Ochs "Kommt a Vogerl g'flogen" (five variations) (1886?) BV 222
Tema con Variazioni (in C major) Op. 6 (1873) BV 6
Inno-Variato (Hymn with variations) Op. 12 (1875) BV 16
Variationen und Fuge in freier Form über Fr. Chopin's C-moll Präludium (Op. 28 No. 20) Op. 22 (1884) BV 213

Wolf Harden, piano

Busoni: Piano Music, Vol. 3. Wolf Harden.

Naxos 8.570249 (Naxos.com prod. page. Retrieved 21 July 2014.)

John Taylor, producer and engineer; Richard Whitehouse, music notes.
Recorded at Potton Hall, Westleton, Suffolk, UK on 11 and 12 March 2006; issued January 2007.
Reviewed by Adrian Corleonis in Fanfare 30:6 (July/Aug 2007). Subscription required. Retrieved 30 July 2014.

Bach: Toccata, Adagio and Fugue in C major, BWV 564, transcribed for piano by Busoni (1899) BV B 29
Trois Morceaux [Three Pieces] Op. 4, 5, and 6 (1883?) BV 197
Zweite Balletszene Op. 20 (1884) BV 209
Zwei Tanzstücke (Two Dance Pieces) Op. 30a (1914) BV 235a
Vierte Ballet Szene (Walzer und Galopp) (Fourth Ballet Scene (Waltz and Gallop)) (1914) BV 238a
Tanzwalzer Op. 53, for orchestra (1920), arr. for piano by Michael von Zadora (1882-1946) BV 288

Wolf Harden, piano

Busoni: Piano Music, Vol. 4. Wolf Harden.

Naxos 8.570543 (Naxos.com prod. page. Retrieved 21 July 2014.)

John Taylor, producer and engineer; Richard Whitehouse, music notes.
Recorded at Potton Hall, Westleton, Suffolk, UK on 20 and 21 May 2007; issued August 2008.
Reviewed by Adrian Corleonis in Fanfare 32:3 (Jan/Feb 2009). Subscription required. Retrieved 30 July 2014.

Bach: Prelude and Fugue in D major for organ, BWV 532 transcribed for piano by Busoni (1888) BV B 20
Elegien. 7 neue Klavierstücke (1907) BV 249

(includes Berceuse (1909) BV 252 as no. 7)

Fantasia nach Johann Sebastian Bach (1909) BV 253
Toccata: Preludio, Fantasia, and Ciaconna (1920) BV 287

Wolf Harden, piano

Busoni: Piano Music, Vol. 5. Wolf Harden.

Naxos 8.570891 (Naxos.com prod. page. Retrieved 21 July 2014.)

John Taylor, producer and engineer; Richard Whitehouse, music notes.
Recorded at Potton Hall, Westleton, Suffolk, UK on 7 and 8 October 2007; issued April 2009.

Bach: Prelude and Fugue in E-flat major for organ (St. Anne), BWV 552 transcribed for piano by Busoni (1890?) BV B 22
Six études Op. 16 (1883) BV 203
(6) Stücke (Pieces) Op. 33b (1895) BV 241
Klavierübung in Ten Books (Second Edition): Book 8: Variations and Variants on Chopin: Neun Variationen über ein Präludium von Chopin, an altered version of Variationen und Fuge in freier Form über Fr. Chopin's C-moll Präludium (Op. 28 No. 20) Op. 22 (1884) BV 213

Wolf Harden, piano

Busoni: Piano Music, Vol. 6. Wolf Harden.

Naxos 8.572077 (Naxos.com prod. page. Retrieved 21 July 2014.)

John Taylor, producer and engineer; Richard Whitehouse, music notes.
Recorded at Potton Hall, Westleton, Suffolk, UK on 23 and 24 April 2008; issued November 2009.
Reviewed by Adrian Corleonis in Fanfare 33:5 (May/June 2010). Subscription required. Retrieved 30 July 2014.

Liszt: Fantasy and Fugue on the Chorale "Ad nos, ad salutarem undam" (S.259) transcribed for piano by Busoni (1897) BV B 59
Sonata in F minor Op. 20 (1883) BV 204
Prélude et Étude en Arpèges (Prelude and Etude in Arpeggios) (1923) BV 297

Wolf Harden, piano

Busoni: Piano Music, Vol. 7. Wolf Harden.

Naxos 8.572422 (Naxos.com prod. page. Retrieved 23 July 2014.)

John Taylor, producer and engineer; Richard Whitehouse, music notes.
Recorded at Potton Hall, Westleton, Suffolk, UK on 15 and 16 June 2009; issued December 2010.

Goldmark: Concert Fantasy on Motives from "Merlin"(Trascrizione di concerto sopra motivi dell'opera Merlin), transcribed for piano by Busoni (1887) BV B 55
Cornelius: Fantasie über Motive aus "Der Barbier von Bagdad" (1886) BV B 52
Klavierübung in 5 Parts: Part III: Staccato: Variations-Studie nach Mozart No. 1 after Serenata from Don Giovanni (K.527), an altered version of the Giga e Variazione from Book 3 of An die Jugend, BV 254 BV 254
Wagner: "Siegfried's Funeral March" from "Götterdämmerung", transcribed for piano by Busoni (1883) BV B 111
Sonatina (no. 3) "ad usum infantis" (1915) BV 268
Kammer-Fantasie über Carmen (Chamber Fantasy after Carmen) (Sonatina no. 6) (1920) BV 284
Fünf kurze Stücke zur Pflege des polyphonen Spiels auf dem Pianoforte (Five short pieces for the cultivation of polyphonic playing on the piano) (1923) BV 296

Wolf Harden, piano

Busoni: Piano Music, Vol. 8. Wolf Harden.

Naxos 8.572845 (Naxos.com prod. page. Retrieved 23 July 2014.)

John Taylor, producer and engineer; Richard Whitehouse, music notes.
Recorded at Wyastone Concert Hall, Monmouth, United Kingdom, on 21 and 22 January 2012; issued February 2013.

24 Préludes Op. 37 (1881) BV 181
Macchietta medioevali (Medieval figures) Op. 33 (11882-1883) BV 194

Wolf Harden, piano

Busoni: Elegies. Ballet Scene No.4. Martin Jones.

Argo ZRG 741 (LP, limited availability)

Michael Brenner, producer; Stanley Goodall, engineer; issued 1973.
Mentioned by Adrian Corleonis in Fanfare 28:4 (Mar/Apr 2005) and 32:3 (Jan/Feb 2009). Subscription required. Retrieved 30 September 2009.

"the ideal balance between atmosphere and crackle" and "...the young Martin Jones, at his divinatory best..."

Elegien. 7 neue Klavierstücke (1907) BV 249

(includes Berceuse (1909) BV 252 as no. 7)

Vierte Ballett-Szene Op. 33a (1892) BV 238

Martin Jones, piano

Ferruccio Busoni. The Major Piano Works. Geoffrey Douglas Madge.

Philips 420 740-2

Recorded live at the Royal Conservatory of The Hague, Netherlands, in 1987.
Reviewed in Gramophone, April, 1988, p. 1477. Retrieved 15 April 2009.

CD 1:
24 Préludes Op. 37 (1880–1881) BV 181
Zwei Tanzstücke Op. 30a (1890/1914) BV 235a
Vierte Ballett-Szene Op. 33a (1892) BV 238

CD 2:
Racconti Fantastici Op. 12 (1881 or 1882) BV 100
Variationen und Fuge in freier Form über Fr. Chopins c-Moll-Präludium (Op. 28, Nr. 20), Op. 22 (1884–1885) BV 213
Macchiette Medioevale Op. 33 (1882–1883) BV 194
Stücke für Pianoforte Op. 33b (1895) BV 41

CD 3:
Elegien. 7 neue Klavierstücke (1907) BV 249

(includes Berceuse (1909) BV 252 as no. 7)

Suite Campestre Op. 18 (1878) BV 81
Zehn Variationen über ein Präludium von Chopin Op. 22 second version (1922) BV 213a

CD 4:
Fantasia Contrappuntistica (1910) BV 256
Choral Vorspiel über ein Bachsches Fragment (1912) BV 256a
Nuit de Noël. Esquisse pour le piano (1908) BV 251
Indianisches Tagebuch. Erstes Buch. Vier Klavierstudien über Motive der Rothäute Amerikas (1915) BV 267
Fantasia nach Johann Sebastian Bach (1909) BV 253

CD 5:
Sonatina (1910) BV 257
Sonatina seconda (1912) BV 259
Sonatina ad usum infantis (1915) BV 268
Sonatina in diem nativitatis Christi MCMXVII (1917) BV 274
Sonatina brevis. In signo Joannis Sebastiani Magni. (1918) BV 280
Sonatina super 'Carmen'. Kammer-Fantasie über Bizets Carmen (1920) BV 284
Drei Albumblätter (1917–1921) BV 289
Notturni. Prologo (1918) BV 279
Perpetuum mobile (1922)BV 293

CD 6:
An die Jugend (1909) BV 254
Sieben kurze Stücke zur Pflege des polyphonischen Spiels auf dem Pianoforte (1923) BV 296
Prélude et Etude en Arpèges (1923) BV 297
Toccata. Preludio – Fantasia – Ciaconna (1920) BV 287

Geoffrey Douglas Madge, piano

Busoni. Fantasia contrappuntistica. Fantasy & Fugue on 'Ad nos'. Hamish Milne.

Hyperion CDA67677

Recorded Henry Wood Hall, Trinity Church Square, London, UK, 10 & 12 October 2007.
Editor's Choice, Gramophone, November, 2008, p.84. Retrieved 17 March 2009.

Liszt: Fantasy and Fugue on the Chorale 'Ad nos, ad salutarem undam' (arr. Busoni) (1897) BV B 59
Mozart: Andantino from Piano Concerto No. 9 in E flat major, K 271 (arr. Busoni) (1913) BV B 84
Fantasia contrappuntistica, edizione definitiva (1910) BV 256

Hamish Milne, piano

Busoni. Late Piano Music. Marc-André Hamelin.

Hyperion CDA67951/3

Recorded Henry Wood Hall, Trinity Church Square, London, UK, 15–17 April 2011 and 15, 16 and 24 August 2012; released November 2013.

CD 1:
Elegien. 7 neue Klavierstücke (1907) BV 249

(includes Berceuse (1909) BV 252 as No. 7)

Nuit de Noël. Esquisse pour le piano (1908) BV 251
Fantasia nach Johann Sebastian Bach (1909) BV 253
Bach: Canonic Variations and Fugue from the "Musical Offering", BWV 1079, transcribed for piano by Busoni BV B 40
Giga, Bolero e Variazione: Studie nach Mozart from An die Jugend (1909) BV 254

Marc- André Hamelin, piano

CD 2:
Sonatina (no. 1) (1910) BV 257
Sonatina seconda (1912) BV 259
Sonatina (no. 3) "ad usum infantis" (1915) BV 268
Sonatina (no. 4) "in diem nativitatis Christi MCMXVII" (1917) BV 274
Sonatina brevis (no. 5), "In Signo Joannis Sebastiani Magni" (1918) BV 280
Kammer-Fantasie über Carmen (Chamber Fantasy after Carmen) (Sonatina no. 6) (1920) BV 284
Klavierskizze: Indiansiches Erntelied (ed. 1911, Antony Beaumont) (score held by Henselt Library, unlisted in BV catalog)
Indianisches Tagebuch. Erstes Buch. (Indian Diary. First Book) (1915) BV 267
Drei Albumblätter (Three Album Leaves) (1921) BV 289

Marc- André Hamelin, piano

CD 3:
Toccata: Preludio, Fantasia, and Ciaconna (1920) BV 287
Notturni (Nocturnes) (in A minor): Prologo (1918) BV 279
^ Klavierübung in zehn Büchern, zweite umgestaltete und bereicherte Ausgabe. (Piano tutorial in ten books, second reorganized and enriched edition.) (1917-1924; second edition published 1925) List of compositions by Ferruccio Busoni, Appendix, No. 7

1. Book 2, Preludio 'Allegro festivo'
2. Book 5, Preludio 'without the third finger, Moderato alla breve'
3. Book 5, Veloce e leggiero
4. Book 6, Vivace moderato, con precisione
5. Book 6, Variations-Studie nach Mozart
6. Book 6, Motive
7a. Book 6, Allegro

Zehn Variationen über ein Präludium von Chopin (1922) BV 213a
Fünf kurze Stücke zur Pflege des polyphonen Spiels auf dem Pianoforte. [Five short pieces for the cultivation of polyphonic playing on the piano.] Listed in this recording as Seven Short Pieces for the Cultivation of Polyphonic Playing (1923) BV 296

1. Preludietto
2. Sostenuto – Poco più andante
3. Andante molto tranquillo e legato
4. Allegro
5. Preludio: Andante tranquillo
6. Nach Mozart: Adagio
7. With the use of the third pedal (Steinway & Sons Sustaining-Pedal): Andantino tranquillo

Perpetuum mobile, 'nach des Concertino II. Satz Op. 54' (Perpetuum mobile, after the second movement of the Concertino Op. 54) (1922) BV 293
Prélude et Étude en Arpèges (Prelude and Etude in Arpeggios) (1923) BV 297

Marc- André Hamelin, piano

Bach-Busoni. Complete Transcriptions. Sandro Ivo Bartoli.

Brilliant Classics 94867. (Brilliant Classics prod. page. Retrieved 20 July 2014.)

Recorded in Gran Teatro Giacomo Puccini, Torre del Lago, Lucca, Italy, 20–23 April 2013; released June 2014.

Reviewed favourably in "La Provincia", 26 June 2014 — Retrieved 23 August 2014:

"Il pianista italiano Sandro Ivo Bartoli dimostra in questo album ... di essere uno dei paladini più ispirati di queste opere, grazie una meravigliosa tavolozza sonora che riesce a esprimere alla perfezione le sonorità e le caratteristiche timbriche degli organo".

Aart van der Wal's review in Opus Klassiek, July 2014 — Retrieved 23 August 2014 – assesses the recordings as follows:

"De uitvoering door de Italiaanse pianist Sandro Ivo Bartoli munt uit in stijvolle articulatie, ritmische precisie, heel mooi gefraseerd, met de beide handen in volmaakt evenwicht (het spreekt voor zich dat in deze bewerkingen het muzikaal soortelijk gewicht van de linkerhand vaak dominant moet zijn en hier ook is). Dit zijn monumentale vertolkingen van monumentale muziek, en bovendien bijzonder fraai opgenomen."

CD 1:

Bach: Prelude and Fugue in D major for organ, BWV 532 transcribed for piano by Busoni (1888) BV B 20
Bach: Prelude and Fugue in E-flat major for organ (St. Anne), BWV 552 transcribed for piano by Busoni (1890?) BV B 22
Bach: Two Toccatas and Fugues in C major and D minor for organ, BWV 564, 565 transcribed for piano by Busoni (1899) BV B 29

1. Toccata, Adagio and Fugue in C major, BWV 564
2. Toccata and Fugue in D minor, BWV 565

Sandro Ivo Bartoli, piano

CD 2:

Bach: Chaconne from Partita No. 2 in D minor for violin, BWV 1004 transcribed for piano by Busoni (1893) BV B 24
Bach: Ten Chorale Preludes for Organ, transcribed for piano by Busoni (1898) BV B 27

1. Komm, Gott, Schöpfer! (Come God, Creator!, BWV 667
2. Wachet auf, ruft uns die Stimme (Awake, the voice commands), BWV 645
3. Nun komm, der Heiden Heiland (Now comes, the Gentiles' Savior), BWV 659
4. Nun freut euch, lieben Christen (Rejoice, beloved Christians), BWV 734
5. Ich ruf' zu dir, Herr Jesu Christ (I call to Thee, Lord Jesus Christ), BWV 639
6. Herr Gott, nun schleuß den Himmel auf (Lord God, heaven's gate unlock!), BWV 617
7. Durch Adams Fall ist ganz verderbt (Through Adam came our fall), BWV 637
8. Durch Adams Fall ist ganz verderbt. Fuga. (2nd version), BWV 705
9. In dir ist Freude (In Thee is joy), BWV 615
10. Jesus Christus, unser Heiland (Jesus Christ, our Savior), BWV 665

Bach: Prelude and Fugue in E minor for organ, BWV 533, transcribed for piano by Busoni (1894) BV B 26

Sandro Ivo Bartoli, piano

Liszt/Busoni. Transcriptions. Sandro Ivo Bartoli.

Brilliant Classics 94200. (Brilliant Classics.com prod. page. Retrieved 20 July 2014.)

Recorded in the Enrico Caruso Auditorium, Gran Teatro Giacomo Puccini, Torre del Lago, Lucca, Italy, 14 & 15 January 2011; released March 2011.

Dr. Michael Loos review of this recording in klassik.com appears under the headline, "Spectacular and profound."
A review from Umberto Padroni in "Suono", July 2011 concludes:

"Sandro Ivo Bartoli integra con una tastiera eloquente e di colori smaltati l'arte dei suoi due grandi mentori." (The words "due grandi mentore" refer back to the reviewer's analysis of Liszt and Busoni.)

Liszt: Grandes études de Paganini, S141

1. Étude No. 1 (in G minor) after Paganini (S.141, no. 1), Tremolo, ed. for piano by Busoni (1923) BV B 75
2. Étude No. 2 (in E-flat major) after Paganini (S.141, no. 2), Andantino capriccioso, ed. for piano by Busoni (1916) BV B 70
3. Étude No. 3 "La Campanella" (in G-sharp minor) after Paganini (S.141, no. 3), ed. for piano by Busoni (1915) BV B 68
4. Étude No. 4 (in E major) after Paganini (S.141, no. 4), Arpeggio, ed. for piano by Busoni (1921) BV B 74
5. Étude No. 5 (in E major) after Paganini (S.141, no. 5) "La Chasse" for piano, ed. for piano by Busoni (1923) BV B 76
6. Étude No. 6 (in A minor) after Paganini (S.141, no. 6), Tema e variazioni, ed. for piano by Busoni (1923) BV B 67

Liszt: Hungarian Rhapsody No. 19, S623a, ed. for piano by Busoni (1920) BV B 73
Liszt: Mephisto Waltz from Deux Épisodes d'apres le Faust de Lenau (S.110 no. 2) (Mephisto Waltz No. 1: "Der Tanz in der Dorfschenke"), ed. for piano by Busoni (1904) BV B61
Liszt: Fantasy and Fugue on the Chorale "Ad nos, ad salutarem undam" (S.259), ed. for piano by Busoni (1897) BV B 59

Sandro Ivo Bartoli, piano

Ferruccio Busoni. John Buttrick.

Jecklin-Disco 94223. (No longer in catalog)

Recorded in the Radio DRS Studio, Zürich, Switzerland, 1988; released 1988

Variationen und Fuge in freier Form über Fr. Chopins c-Moll-Präludium (Op. 28, Nr. 20), Op. 22 (1884–1885) BV 213
Fantasia nach Johann Sebastian Bach (1909) BV 253
Bach: Ten Chorale Preludes for Organ, transcribed for piano by Busoni (1898) BV B 27

2. Wachet auf, ruft uns die Stimme (Awake, the voice commands), BWV 645
3. Nun komm, der Heiden Heiland (Now comes, the Gentiles' Savior), BWV 659

Klavierübung in fünf Teilen (Piano tutorial in five parts) (First Edition): Part V: Variations. Perpetual motion. Scales.: Zehn Variationen über ein Präludium von Chopin (Ten Variations on a Prelude by Chopin), a shorter version of Zehn Variationen über ein Präludium von Chopin (1922) BV 213a

John Buttrick, piano

Busoni: Fantasia Contrappuntistica, Elegies. Sandro Ivo Bartoli.

Brilliant Classics 94223 (Brilliant Classics prod. page. Retrieved 23 July 2014.)

Recorded in the Enrico Caruso Auditorium, Gran Teatro Giacomo Puccini, Torre del Lago, Lucca, Italy, 11 & 12 March 2011; released June 2011.

Fantasia contrappuntistica, edizione definitiva (1910), second edition published by Breitkopf & Härtel, 1916 BV 256
Elegien. 7 neue Klavierstücke (1907) BV 249

(includes Berceuse (1909) BV 252 as No. 7)
Sandro Ivo Bartoli, piano

Busoni: Piano Transcriptions. Holger Groschopp.

Capriccio C7015 (Capriccio prod. page. Retrieved 21 August 2014.)

Released 2009.

Reviewed favourably by Adrian Corleonis in Fanfare 33:4 (Mar/Apr 2010). Subscription required. Retrieved 22 August 2014. His remarks include:

"This collection of Busoni transcriptions, while far from complete, offers a number of previously unrecorded curiosities chiming in teasingly amid rarities and standards, in performances ranging from genial to towering. In the Fantasy and Fugue on Ad nos ... Groschopp takes the bit in a magisterial account which puts most organists to shame and casts Hamish Milne's prim go at the transcription into deep shade (Hyperion 67677, Fanfare 32:3)."

James Leonard at allmusic.com — Retrieved 22 August 2014 – says:

"Groschopp has the speed, the dexterity, and the strength to bring off the most technically difficult pieces, along with the intelligence, the character, and the charisma to make the most interpretively difficult pieces compelling."

CD 1:
Sonatina super 'Carmen'. Kammer-Fantasie über Bizets Carmen (1920) BV 284
Brahms: Six Chorale Preludes for Organ, from Op. 122, transcribed for piano by Busoni (1902) BV B 50

No. 4: Herzlich thut mich erfreuen (My inmost heart rejoiced)
No. 5: Schmücke dich, o Liebe Seele (Deck thyself out, o my soul)
No. 8: Es ist ein Ros' entsprungen (A rose breaks into bloom)
No. 9: Herzlich tut mich verlangen (My inmost heart doth yearn)
No. 10: Herzlich tut mich verlangen (My inmost heart doth yearn)
No. 11: O Welt, ich muss dich lassen (O world, I e'en must leave thee)

Bach: Chaconne from Partita No. 2 in D minor for violin, BWV 1004 transcribed for piano by Busoni (1893) BV B 24
Beethoven: Écossaises for piano, WoO 83, ed. for piano by Busoni (1888) BV B 47
Schoenberg: Piano Piece, Op. 11, no. 2, (Massig), ed. for piano by Busoni (1909) BV B 97
Wagner: "Siegfried's Funeral March" from "Götterdämmerung", transcribed for piano by Busoni (1883) BV B 111

Holger Groschopp, piano

CD2:
Große Fuge (Great Fugue) (1910), BV 255
Nováček: Scherzo from the String Quartet No. 1 in E minor, transcribed for piano by Busoni (1892) BV B 95
Klavierübung in 5 Parts: Part 3: Staccato: Variations-Studie nach Mozart No. 1 after Serenata from Don Giovanni (K.527), an altered version of the Giga e Variazione from Book 3 of An die Jugend, BV 254 BV 254
Klavierübung in 5 Parts: Part 2: Three Piano Tutorials and Preludes: VI Examples of "À trois mains": Nach Offenbach: Barcarolle from The Tales of Hoffmann, transcribed for piano by Busoni
Klavierübung in 5 Parts: Part 2: Three Piano Tutorials and Preludes: VII Trills: Liszt: Gondoliera, S.162 No. 1 from Venezia e Napoli, ed. for piano by Busoni
Liszt: Fantasy and Fugue on the Chorale "Ad nos, ad salutarem undam" (S.259), ed. for piano by Busoni (1897) BV B 59
Bach: The Well-Tempered Clavier, Parts I and II, BWV 846-893, transcribed for piano by Busoni (1894, 1915) BV B 25

Part 1, No. 1, Prelude and Fugue in C major, BWV 846 "Widmung"

Holger Groschopp, piano

CD3:
Bach: Prelude and Fugue in E-flat major for organ (St. Anne), BWV 552, transcribed for piano by Busoni (1890?) BV B 22
Fünf kurze Stücke zur Pflege des polyphonen Spiels auf dem Pianoforte. [Five short pieces for the cultivation of polyphonic playing on the piano.] (1923) BV 296

5. Preludio: Andante tranquillo

Mozart: Adagio and Fugue in C Minor, K. 546, the fugue was partly transcribed for piano by Busoni (ca. 1888) and the entire transcription was completed by Groschopp BV B94
Giga, Bolero e Variazione: Studie nach Mozart from An die Jugend (1909) BV 254
Cornelius: Fantasie über Motive aus "Der Barbier von Bagdad" (1886) BV B 52
Liszt: Mephisto Waltz from Deux Épisodes d'apres le Faust de Lenau (S.110 no. 2) (Mephisto Waltz No. 1: "Der Tanz in der Dorfschenke"), ed. for piano by Busoni (1904) BV B61
Klavierübung in 5 Parts: Part 3: Staccato: Nach Mendelssohn, Vivace assai (the Presto from the Mendelssohn-Liszt edition of the Wedding March and Elfin Chorus, S.410)

Holger Groschopp, piano

CD4:
Bach: Prelude and Fugue in E minor for organ, BWV 533, transcribed for piano by Busoni (1894) BV B 26
Schubert Overture in E minor for Orchestra, D. 648 transcribed for piano by Busoni (1889) BV B 104
Variationen und Fuge in freier Form über Fr. Chopins c-Moll-Präludium (Op. 28, Nr. 20), Op. 22 (1884–1885) BV 213
Canto e Valse, ed. by Ronald Stevenson (1884, 1922)
An die Jugend (1909) BV 254

2. Preludio, fuga e fuga figurata
4. Introduzione e Capriccio (Paganinesco)

Drei Albumblätter (1917–1921) BV 289

3. In der Art eines Choralvorspiels

Bach: The Well-Tempered Clavier, Parts I and II, BWV 846-893, transcribed for piano by Busoni (1894, 1915) BV B 25

Part 1, No. 3, Prelude in C sharp Major, BWV 848
Part 1, No. 21 Prelude in B flat Major, BWV 866

Sonatina brevis (no. 5), "In Signo Joannis Sebastiani Magni" (1918) BV 280
Liszt Fantasy on Two Motives from W. A. Mozart's "Le Nozze di Figaro" (S.697), completed by Busoni (1912) BV B 66
Klavierübung in 5 Parts: Part 3: Staccato: Nach Gounod, Andante con moto (a cadenza the Liszt-Gounod Valse de l'Opera Faust, S.407)

Holger Groschopp, piano

Busoni: Bach Transcriptions. Holger Groschopp.

Capriccio C5198 (Capriccio prod. page. Retrieved 21 August 2014.)

Released 28 April 2014.

In his review at allmusic.com — Retrieved 22 August 2014 — James Manhein concludes:
"Highly recommended, and likely to help further what is already a substantial revival in Busoni's music."

CD 1:
Bach: Prelude and Fugue in D major for organ, BWV 532 transcribed for piano by Busoni (1888) BV B 20
Bach: Two Toccatas and Fugues in C major and D minor for organ, BWV 564, 565 transcribed for piano by Busoni (1899) BV B 29

1. Toccata, Adagio and Fugue in C major, BWV 564
2. Toccata and Fugue in D minor, BWV 565

Bach: Ten Chorale Preludes for Organ, transcribed for piano by Busoni (1898) BV B 27

1. Komm, Gott, Schöpfer! (Come God, Creator!, BWV 667
2. Wachet auf, ruft uns die Stimme (Awake, the voice commands), BWV 645
3. Nun komm, der Heiden Heiland (Now comes, the Gentiles' Savior), BWV 659
4. Nun freut euch, lieben Christen (Rejoice, beloved Christians), BWV 734
5. Ich ruf' zu dir, Herr Jesu Christ (I call to Thee, Lord Jesus Christ), BWV 639
6. Herr Gott, nun schleuß den Himmel auf (Lord God, heaven's gate unlock!), BWV 617
7. Durch Adams Fall ist ganz verderbt (Through Adam came our fall), BWV 637
8. Durch Adams Fall ist ganz verderbt. Fuga. (2nd version), BWV 705
9. In dir ist Freude (In Thee is joy), BWV 615
10. Jesus Christus, unser Heiland (Jesus Christ, our Savior), BWV 665

Holger Groschopp, piano

CD2:
Fantasia contrappuntistica, edizione definitiva (1910), second edition published by Breitkopf & Härtel, 1916 BV 256

1. Preludio corale

Bach: Capriccio on the Departure of His Beloved Brother, in B-flat major for harpsichord, BWV 992, transcribed for piano by Busoni (1914) BV B 34
Bach: Fantasy, Adagio, and Fugue for harpsichord, BWV 906, 968, transcribed for piano by Busoni (1915) BV B 37
Bach: Canonic Variations and Fugue from the "Musical Offering," BWV 1079, transcribed for piano by Busoni (1916) BV B 40
Floh-Sprung. Canon for two voices with obbligato bass (1914) BV 265
after Bach: Two Chorale Preludes (Das Calvarium), transcribed for piano by Busoni (fragments only - date unknown) BV B 46
+ transcriptions by Michael von Zadora and Egon Petri and a composition by Anna Weiß-Busoni

Holger Groschopp, piano

Busoni/Bach – Liszt. Piano Music. Claudius Tanski.

Dabringhaus und Grimm Audiovision GmbH. MDG 312 1323-2 (MDG prod. page. Retrieved 23 July 2014.)

Recorded Fürstliche Reitbahn Bad Arolsen, Waldeck-Frankenberg, Germany, 15 & 16 July 2014.
Werner Dabringhaus & Reimund Grimm, production; Werner Dabringhaus, sound engineer; Manfred Bürki, piano tuner; Axel Schröter, sleevenotes.

Sieben Elegien (1907) BV 249

1. Nach der Wendung (Recueillement) (After the Turning (Contemplation))

Bach: Goldberg Variations (Air with 30 Variations for harpsichord), BWV 988, edited for piano by Busoni (1914) BV B 35
Bach: Ten Chorale Preludes for Organ, transcribed for piano by Busoni (1898) BV B 27

3. Nun komm, der Heiden Heiland (Now comes, the Gentiles' Savior), BWV 659

+ Liszt: Années de pèlerinage: Deuxième année: Italie" ("Second Year: Italy"), S.161: Petrarch Sonnets

4. Sonnet 47
5. Sonnet 104
6. Sonnet 123

Claudius Tanski, piano.

Ferruccio Busoni. Piano Works. Claudius Tanski.

Dabringhaus und Grimm Audiovision GmbH. MDG 312 0436-2 (MDG prod. page. Retrieved 24 July 2014.)

Recorded Fürstliche Reitbahn Bad Arolsen, Waldeck-Frankenberg, Germany, October 1991, March 1992.
Werner Dabringhaus & Reimund Grimm, production; Werner Dabringhaus, sound engineer; 1901 Model D Steinway piano; Anthony Beaumont, sleevenotes.

Bach: Bach: Toccata and Fugue in D minor, BWV 565, transcribed for piano by Busoni (1899) BV B 29

Toccata only.

Bach: Bach: Ten Chorale Preludes for Organ, transcribed for piano by Busoni (1898) BV B 27

1. Komm, Gott, Schöpfer! (Come God, Creator!, BWV 667
2. Wachet auf, ruft uns die Stimme (Awake, the voice commands), BWV 645
5. Ich ruf' zu dir, Herr Jesu Christ (I call to Thee, Lord Jesus Christ), BWV 639

Elegien. 7 neue Klavierstücke (1907) BV 249

3. "Meine Seele bangt und hofft zu Dir" (Choralvorspiel)
4. "Turandots Frauengemach" (Intermezzo)
5. "Die Nächtlichen" (Walzer)
6. "Erscheinung" (Notturno)

Sonatina seconda (1912) BV 259
Toccata: Preludio, Fantasia, and Ciaconna (1920) BV 287

Claudius Tanski, piano

Busoni: Fantasia contrappuntistica. Vlad: Opus Triplex. Carlo Grante.

Music & Arts CD-1186 (Music & Arts prod. page. Retrieved 23 August 2014.) Released 2006.

Doriana Attili, Gabriele Robotti & Matteo Costa, artistic producers; Gabriele Robotti & Matteo Costa, engineers; Silvano Santa, technical consultant; Carlo Grante & Roman Vlad, sleevenotes.

Reviewed by Adrian Corleonis in Fanfare 30:3 (Jan/Feb 2007). Subscription required. Retrieved 23 August 2014.
Fantasia contrappuntistica, edizione definitiva, (1910) BV 256 BV 256
+ Bach: Chorale Prelude, Wenn wir in höchsten Nöten sein, BWV 641, transcribed for piano by Roman Vlad
+ Vlad: Opus Triplex

Carlo Grante, piano

Visions - Busoni · Bloch · Finnissy · Flynn. Carlo Grante.

Music & Arts CD-1247(2) (Music & Arts prod. page. Retrieved 23 August 2014.) Released 2011.

Matteo Costa, Albert Frantz, Gabriele Robotti & Martin Klebahn, editing & engineers; Silvano Zanta, piano preparation; Carlo Grante, Kenneth Derus, Michael Finnissy & George Flynn, sleevenotes.

Reviewed by Scott Noriega in Fanfare 34:6 (July/Aug 2011). Subscription required. Retrieved 23 August 2014.
Drei Albumblätter (1917–1921) BV 289
Indianisches Tagebuch. Erstes Buch. Vier Klavierstudien über Motive der Rothäute Amerikas (1915) BV 267
+ Flynn: Glimpses of Our Inner Lives
+ Finnissy: Bachsche Nachdichtungen
+ Bloch: Visions and Prophecies

Carlo Grante, piano

Inspired by Bach: Works for Piano by Ferruccio Busoni & Paolo Troncon. Carlo Grante.

Music & Arts CD-11576 (Music & Arts prod. page. Retrieved 23 August 2014.) Released 2005.

Doriana Attili, artistic director; Emilio Eria, engineer; Corrado Greco, editing & mastering; Antony Beaumont & Doriana Attili, sleevenotes.

Reviewed by Adrian Corleonis in Fanfare 29:1 (Sept/Oct 2005). Subscription required. Retrieved 23 August 2014.
Fantasia nach Johann Sebastian Bach (1909) BV 253
Prélude et Etude en Arpèges (1923) BV 297
Perpetuum mobile (1922) BV 293
^ Klavierübung in zehn Büchern, zweite umgestaltete und bereicherte Ausgabe. (Piano tutorial in ten books, second reorganized and enriched edition.) (1917-1924; second edition published 1925) List of compositions by Ferruccio Busoni, Appendix, No. 7

3. Book 5, Veloce e leggiero

+ Troncon: Six Preludes and Fugues

Carlo Grante, piano

Busoni, Liszt, Sorabji: Operatic Fantasias for Piano. Carlo Grante.

Altarus Records AIR-CD-9098 (Altarus Records prod. page. Retrieved 23 August 2014.) Released 1994.

Peter Salisbury, piano technician; Frank Cooper, sleevenotes.

Reviewed by Adrian Corleonis in Fanfare 17:6 (Jul/Aug 1994). Subscription required. Retrieved 23 August 2014.
Kammer-Fantasie über Carmen (Chamber Fantasy after Carmen) (Sonatina no. 6) (1920) BV 284
+ Liszt: Réminiscences de Norma, transcription for piano (after Bellini), S.394
+ Liszt: Réminiscences de Don Juan (I & II), for piano (after Mozart: Don Giovanni), S.418
+Sorabji: Trois Pastiches: No 2, Pastiche on the Habañera from Bizet's Carmen, for piano

Carlo Grante, piano

The Essence of Busoni. Ronald Stevenson.

Altarus Records AIR-CD-9041 (Altarus Records prod. page. Retrieved 24 August 2014.) Released 1996.

Ronald Stevenson, sleevenotes.

Toccata: Preludio, Fantasia, and Ciaconna (1920) BV 287
Zehn Variationen über ein Präludium von Chopin (1884 rev. 1922) BV 213a
Prélude et Etude en Arpèges (1923) BV 297
Tanzwalzer Op. 53, for orchestra (1920), arr. for piano by Michael von Zadora (1882-1946) BV 288
An die Jugend (1909) BV 254
+Stevenson: Prelude, Fugue and Fantasy on Themes From Busoni's "Faust"

Ronald Stevenson, piano

Busoni. Piano Concerto · Turandot Suite · Sarabande and Cortège · Piano Works. John Ogdon, Thomas Adès and others.

EMI Classics 4 56324 2 (Warner Classics prod. page.. Retrieved 19 August 2014.)

David Gutman, sleevenotes, 2010.
Recorded No. 1 Studio, Abbey Road, London, UK, 19, 23 November 1960 & 30 March 1991.
Ronald Kinloch Anderson & Peter Andry, producers; Edward Huntley & Neville Boyling, balance engineers.

Zehn Variationen über ein Präludium von Chopin (1884 rev. 1922) BV 213a
Elegien. 7 neue Klavierstücke (1907) BV 249

4. "Turandots Frauengemach" (Intermezzo)

Kammer-Fantasie über Carmen (Chamber Fantasy after Carmen) (Sonatina no. 6) (1920) BV 284

John Ogdon, piano
Recorded Potton Hall, Westleton, Suffolk, UK, 7–10 November 2000.
Stephen Jones, producer; Arne Akselberg, balance engineer; Richard Hale, technical engineer.

Sonatina (no. 3) "ad usum infantis" (1915) BV 268
Thomas Adès, piano
+Busoni: Piano Concerto in C major, Op. 39, BV 247 (1901-03, 1904): John Ogdon, piano; Men's voices of the John Alldis Choir; Royal Philharmonic Orchestra; Daniell Revenaugh, conductor.
+Busoni: Berceuse élégiaque, Op. 42 BV 252a (1909): New Philharmonia Orchestra; Frederik Prausnitz, conductor.
+Busoni: Turandot Suite, Op. 42, BV 248 (1904): Orchestra Filarmonica della Scala; Riccardo Muti, conductor.
+Busoni: Sarabande und Cortège, Op. 51. Two studies for Doktor Faust, (Fifth and Sixth Elegies for Orchestra), BV 282 (1918-19): Royal Philharmonic Orchestra; Daniell Revenaugh, conductor.

Busoni. Piano Works. John Ogdon.

Altarus Records AIR-CD-9074 (catalog page. Retrieved 24 May 2009.)

CD reissued in 2005.
First issued as an analog LP on Altarus AIR-2-9074 in 1986 (without BV 287).
First reissued in digital format as Continuum CCD 1006 (CD) in 1989 (with BV 287).
Recommended in 1996 Penguin Guide:

"Ronald Stevenson calls Busoni's remarkable Fantasia contrappuntistica a masterpiece and, listening to John Ogdon's performance, one is tempted to agree. The Fantasia after J. S. Bach was written a year earlier and is among Busoni's most concentrated and powerful piano works."

Fantasia contrappuntistica, edizione definitiva (1910) BV 256
Fantasia nach J.S. Bach (1909) BV 253
Toccata (1921) BV 287

John Ogdon, piano

In Memoriam John Ogdon. John Ogdon & others.

Altarus Records AIR-CD-9063(2) (Altarus Records prod. page. Retrieved 24 August 2014.) Released 1996.
Fantasia nach J.S. Bach (1909) BV 253
Elegien. 7 neue Klavierstücke (1907) BV 249

2. All'Italia

+ works by Hinton, Stevenson, Busoni arr. Middelschulte & Ogdon.

John Ogdon, piano

Ferruccio Busoni: Transcriptions after J.S. Bach. John Ogdon

Altarus Records AIR-CD-9070(2) (Altarus Records prod. page. Retrieved 24 August 2014.) Released 2005.
Bach: Two Toccatas and Fugues in C major and D minor for organ, BWV 564, 565 transcribed for piano by Busoni (1899) BV B 29

1. Toccata, Adagio and Fugue in C major, BWV 564
2. Toccata and Fugue in D minor, BWV 565

Bach: Ten Chorale Preludes for Organ, transcribed for piano by Busoni (1898) BV B 27

3. Nun komm, der Heiden Heiland (Now comes, the Gentiles' Savior), BWV 659
5. Ich ruf' zu dir, Herr Jesu Christ (I call to Thee, Lord Jesus Christ), BWV 639
7a. Durch Adams Fall ist ganz verderbt (Through Adam came our fall), BWV 637
7b. Durch Adams Fall ist ganz verderbt. Fuga. (2nd version), BWV 705
9. Jesus Christus, unser Heiland (Jesus Christ, our Savior), BWV 665

Bach: Prelude and Fugue in E-flat major for organ (St. Anne), BWV 552, transcribed for piano by Busoni (1890?) BV B 22
Fantasia contrappuntistica, edizione definitiva (1910) BV 256

John Ogdon, piano

Busoni: Piano Works. Roland Pöntinen.

CPO 999 -2

Recorded 20–23 September 1999.

Sonatina (No. 1) (1910) BV 257
Sonatina seconda (1912) BV 259
Sonatina (No. 3) "ad usum infantis" (1915) BV 268
Sonatina (No. 4) "in diem nativitatis Christi" (1917) BV 274
Sonatina brevis (No. 5) "in signo Joannis Sebastiani Magni" (1918) BV 280
Sonatina No. 6 (Sonatina super Carmen]) (1920) BV 284
Indianisches Tagebuch, Erstes Buch (1915) BV 267
Toccata (1921) BV 287

Roland Pöntinen, piano

Busoni: Piano Works (Vol. 2). Roland Pöntinen.

CPO 999 853-2

Recorded Kammermusikstudio des Südwestrundfunk, Stuttgart, 15–18 October 2001; 17 January 2002.

Sieben Elegien (1907) BV 249

(includes Berceuse (1909) BV 252 as no. 7)

Perpetuum mobile (1922) BV 293
Sieben kurze Stücke (1923) BV 296
Prélude et Etude en Arpèges (1923) BV 297

Roland Pöntinen, piano

Busoni The Visionary. Jeni Slotchiver.

Centaur Records CRC 2438

Recorded The Academy of Arts & Letters, New York, 6 and 7 September 1994.

Red Indian Diary, Book 1 (1915) BV 267
Elegien. 7 neue Klavierstücke (1907) BV 249

(includes Berceuse (1909) BV 252 as no. 7)

Chaconne from Partita No. 2 in D minor for violin (Bach, BWV 1004), tr. for piano (1893) BV B 24

Jeni Slotchiver, piano

Busoni The Visionary II. Jeni Slotchiver.

Centaur Records CRC 2681

Recorded The Academy of Arts & Letters, New York, 26, 28 and 29 September 2002.

Sonatina (No. 1) (1910) BV 257
Sonatina seconda (1912) BV 259
Sonatina (No. 3) "ad usum infantis" (1915) BV 268
Sonatina (No. 4) "in diem nativitatis Christi" (1917) BV 274
Sonatina brevis (No. 5) "in signo Joannis Sebastiani Magni" (1918) BV 280
Sonatina No. 6 (Sonatina super Carmen]) (1920) BV 284
Toccata (1921) BV 287

Jeni Slotchiver, piano

Liszt & Busoni: '...and that is death' — J. Y. Song.

ProPiano Records PPR224527 (ProPiano prod. page.. Retrieved 4 June 2009.

Recorded The Academy of Arts & Letters, New York, 23 December 1998.
Reviewed favorably by Peter J. Rabinowitz in Fanfare, 23:2 (Nov/Dec 1999). Subscription required. Retrieved 4 June 2009.

"It's not simply that she can control huge masses of sound or weld long strings of notes into a solid structure; she also has an extraordinary ability to give each polyphonic voice its own rhythmic character in a way that opens up the music's textures, a gift that pays special dividends in the Busoni."

Zehn Variationen über ein Präludium von Chopin Op. 22 second version (1922) BV 213a
Fantasia nach J.S. Bach (1909) BV 253
Berceuse (1909) BV 252
+ Liszt: Totentanz (Danse macabre), solo piano version (1860–65) S.525
+ Liszt: La lugubre gondola II (1882) S.200

J. Y. Song, piano

Busoni. Piano Works. Geoffrey Tozer.

Chandos 9394 (Chandos prod. page. Retrieved 9 February 2009.)

Recorded The School of St Helen & St Katherine, Abingdon, 26 & 27 July 1993; 14 & 15 July 1994.
Recommended in 2008 Penguin Guide

Sonatina No. 6 (1920) (Kammerfantasie super Carmen) (1920) BV 284
Exeunt omnes (1896) from Stücke (1895) BV 241
All'Italia! (1907) from Elegien (1907) BV 249
Turandots Frauengemach from Elegien (1907) BV 249
Berceuse (1909) BV 252
Fantasia nach J.S. Bach (1909) BV 253
Giga, Bolero e Variazione from An die Jugend (1909) BV 254
Sonatina Seconda (1912) BV 259
Indianisches Tagebuch [Red Indian Diary], Book 1 (1915) BV 267
Toccata (1921) BV 287
Bach: Prelude and Fugue in D, BWV 532, arr. Busoni (1888) BV B 20

Geoffrey Tozer, piano

Chaconne: Bach Transcribed by Busoni, Liszt, Rachmaninov and Others. Gordon Fergus-Thompson.

ASV CD DCA 759

Alexander Waugh, producer; Martin Haskell, recording engineer; Steinway & Sons, piano; Alexander Waugh, sleevenotes.
Recorded in St. Dunstan's Church, Cheam, London Borough of Sutton, United Kingdom; issued 1 April 1991.

Bach: Chaconne from Partita No. 2 in D minor for violin, BWV 1004, transcribed for piano by Busoni (1893) BV B 24
Bach: Ten Chorale Preludes for Organ, transcribed for piano by Busoni (1898) BV B 27

2. Wachet auf, ruft uns die Stimme (Awake, the voice commands), BWV 645
3. Nun komm, der Heiden Heiland (Now comes, the Gentiles' Savior), BWV 659
4. Nun freut euch, lieben Christen (Rejoice, beloved Christians), BWV 734
5. Ich ruf' zu dir, Herr Jesu Christ (I call to Thee, Lord Jesus Christ), BWV 639

Bach: Toccata and Fugue in D minor, BWV 565, transcribed for piano by Busoni (1899) BV B 29
+ transcriptions by Franz Liszt, Lord Berners, Dame Myra Hess, Wilhelm Kempff, Christopher Le Fleming and Sergei Rachmaninov.

Gordon Fergus-Thompson, piano

Cramer. Piano Works. Gianluca Luisi, Giampaolo Stuani, Alessandro Deljavan.

Grand Piano GP613-14 (Naxos prod. page. Retrieved 29 July 2014.)

Recorded in Chiesa di Sant' Eusebio, Vicenza, Italy, 18-20, 31 May, 1 June 2011; issued 2011.

8 Etudes de piano par JB Cramer choisies des 16 nouvelles études, Op 81, transcribed for piano by Busoni (1897), published that year, then reprinted with slight alterations as part of "Klavierübung in Five Parts" (First Edition): Part 4: Eight Etudes by Cramer (1921) and with further changes in "Klavierübung in Ten Books" (Second Edition): Book 7: Eight Etudes after Cramer (published posthumously 1925) BV B 53

Gianluca Luisi, piano

+ Cramer: 84 Études for piano in Four Books, Op. 50 (1804-1810)

Book 1, Gianluca Luisi, piano
Book 2, Alessandro Deljavan, piano
Book 3, Giampaolo Stuani, piano
Book 4, Gianluca Luisi, piano

A Cathedral for Bach: Busoni/Bach/Bartók. Piano Works. Jan Michiels.

Etcetera KTC1390 (Discogs prod. page. Retrieved 30 July 2014.}

Paul Janse, executive producer; Marcel van Tilburg & Marijke van der Harst, producers; Yannick Willox, recording engineer; 1875 Steinway (collection of Chris Maene), piano; Peter Head, piano technician.
Recorded in the Great Hall, Royal Conservatory of Brussels, Belgium, 13–15 May 2009; issued 15 March 2010.

Fantasia nach J.S. Bach (1909) BV 253
Fantasia contrappuntistica, edizione definitiva (1910) BV 256
Bach: Ten Chorale Preludes for Organ, transcribed for piano by Busoni (1898) BV B 27

4. Nun freut euch, lieben Christen (Rejoice, beloved Christians), BWV 734
7. Durch Adams Fall ist ganz verderbt (Through Adam came our fall), BWV 637
8. Durch Adams Fall ist ganz verderbt. Fuga. (2nd version), BWV 705
9. In dir ist Freude (In Thee is joy), BWV 615
10. Jesus Christus, unser Heiland (Jesus Christ, our Savior), BWV 665

+ Bach: The Well-Tempered Clavier BWV 846–893: excerpts, edited for the piano by Bartók

Jan Michiels, piano

Schumann: Humoreske; Busoni: Fantasia Contrappuntistica. Jacob Greenberg.

New Focus Recordings FCR121 (New Focus Recordings prod. page. Retrieved 23 August 2014.}

Jacob Greenberg, executive producer & editing producer; Ryan Streber, session producer, recording engineer, digital editing, mixing a& post-production; Steinway piano; Arlan Harris, piano technician; Jacob Greenberg, sleevenotes.
Recorded at Oktaven Audio, Yonkers, NY, USA. Schumann recorded 21–22 December 2010, Busoni recorded 8–9 January 2011. Recording made with sponsorship from the New York Foundation for the Arts. Released 11 October 2011.

Reviewed by Doyle Armbrust in Time Out Chicago, 20 July 2011 (. Retrieved 23 August 2014.) and was announced by that publication on 14 December 2011 as one of the 10 Best classical albums 2011 (. Retrieved 23 August 2014.)
Reviewed favourably by Scott Noriega in Fanfare 35:4 (Mar/Apr 2012). Subscription required. Retrieved 23 August 2014. His conclusion was:

"If you are looking for a fascinating recording, one that makes you think and feel, then look no further...Greenberg and Busoni make a perfect match."

Fantasia contrappuntistica, edizione definitiva (1910) BV 256
+ Schumann: Humoreske in B flat Major, Op 20

Jacob Greenberg, piano

Arturo Benedetti-Michelangeli. Bach – Brahms – Mozart. Arturo Benedetti-Michelangeli.

EMI Italiana CDM 7 69241 2

Recorded in London, United Kingdom, 27 October 1948

Bach: Chaconne from Partita No. 2 in D minor for violin, BWV 1004, transcribed for piano by Busoni (1893) BV B 24
+ Brahms: Variations on a Theme of Paganini, Op. 35 (1863)

Recorded in London, United Kingdom, 26 October 1948.

+ Mozart: Piano Concerto No 15 in B-flat major, K.450 (1784): Orchestra Sinfonica da Camera dell'Ente dei "Pomeriggi Musicali" di Milano; Ettore Gracis, conductor.

Recorded in Milan, Italy, 26–27 June 1951.
Arturo Benedetti-Michelangeli, piano

Great Pianists of the 20th Century – Alfred Brendel III.

Philips 456 733-2
Toccata (1921) BV 287

Recorded live in 1979 at the Großer Konzerthaussaal, Vienna

(also includes works by other composers)

Alfred Brendel – Unpublished Live and Radio Performances 1968–2001

Philips 475 8832
"Meine Seele bangt und hofft zu dir" and "Erscheinung" from Elegien (1907) BV 249

Recorded live 22 October 1997 at the Royal Festival Hall, London

(also includes works by other composers)

Dinu Lipatti Collection - 100th Anniversary Edition

Profil Medien PH17011
Bach: Concerto for harpsichord and strings No. 1 in D minor, BWV 1052, tr. for piano and orchestra (1899) BV B 28

Recorded live 2 October 1947 in Amsterdam, Netherlands

(also includes works by other composers)

=== Song recitals ===
Busoni: Songs. Bruns, Eisenlohr.

Naxos 8.557245 Naxos prod. page. Retrieved 9 February 2009.

Recorded Studio 2, Bavarian Radio, Munich, Germany, 5–7 & 9 September 2004; 26 October 2004.
Recommended in 2008 Penguin Guide

Zwei Lieder, Op. 31 (1880) BV 167
Album Vocale, Op. 30 (1884) BV 114
"Wohlauf! Der kühle Winter is vergangen" No. 1 from Zwei Altdeutsche Lieder, Op. 18 (1884) BV 207
Zwei (Hebräische) Lieder, Op. 15 (1884) BV 202
Zwei Lieder, Op. 24 (1885) BV 216
Des Sängers Fluch, Op. 39 (1879) BV 98
Lied des Brander (1918) BV 299
Lied des Mephistopheles, Op. 49, no. 2 (1918) BV 278a
Lied des Unmuts (1918) BV 281
Zigeunerlied, Op. 55, no. 2 (1923) BV 295a
Schlechter Trost (1924) BV 298a
Reminiscenza Rossiniana (1923) BV A 5

Martin Bruns, baritone
Ulrich Eisenlohr, piano

=== Operas ===
Busoni. Die Brautwahl. Fernando Previtali.

Gala GL 100.719 (Recorded live in Turin on 17 April 1975; issued on 2 CDs in 2002.)

Note: Contains small cuts amounting to about one-sixth of the score, but does include every scene and in the original order.

Die Brautwahl (1911) BV 258

George Fourié (Voswinkel); Lilian Sukis (Albertine); Gerald English (Thusman); Herbert Handt (Edmund Lehsen); Sigmund Nimsgern (Leonhard); Raffaele Arié (Manasse); Ermanno Lorenzi (Baron Bensch); Bruno Andreas (A Servant)
Orchestra and Chorus of RAI Turin; Fernando Previtali, conductor

Busoni. Die Brautwahl. Daniel Barenboim.

Teldec 3984-25250-2 (Warner Classics prod. page. Retrieved 9 February 2009.)
(Also Elektra (cat. no. not listed)

Recorded live Deutsche Staatsoper Berlin, Nov 1993.
Note: Approximately one-third of the opera has been cut, including two complete scenes, and one of the remaining has been moved to a new position in the score.
Recommended in 2008 Gramophone Guide

Die Brautwahl (1911) BV 258

Siegfried Vogel (Voswinkel); Carola Höhn (Albertine); Graham Clark (Thusman); Vinson Cole (Lehsen); Pär Lindskog (Baron Bensch); Roman Trekel (Leonhard); Günter von Karmen (Manasse)
Chor der Deutschen Staatsoper Berlin; Staatskapelle Berlin; Daniel Barenboim, conductor

Busoni: Arlecchino. Gerd Albrecht.

Capriccio 60 033-1 (Naxos prod. page.. Retrieved 21 June 2009.)

Recorded at Jesus-Christus-Kirche, Berlin, Dahlem, 2–4 January 1992 and 4 December 1992; issued 1994.
Reviewed very favorably by Michael Stewart in Gramophone, November 1994, p.144.. Retrieved 21 June 2009.

"Capriccio's Complete Busoni Edition is shaping up to be a very impressive series indeed. ... Altogether a highly recommendable issue."

Arlecchino (1916) BV 270

Peter Matič (Arlecchino, spoken) /Robert Wörle (Arlecchino, sung); René Pape (Ser Matteo del Sarto); Siegfried Lorenz (Abbate Cospicuo); Peter Lika (Dottor Bombasto); Robert Wörle (Leandro); Marcia Bellamy (Colombina, sung) /Katharina Koschny (Colombina, spoken)
Berlin Radio Symphony Orchestra; Gerd Albrecht, conductor

Busoni: Turandot. Gerd Albrecht.

Capriccio 60 039-1 (Naxos prod. page.. Retrieved 21 June 2009.)

Recorded at Jesus-Christus-Kirche, Berkin, Dahlem, 21–25 January 1992; issued 1993.
Reviewed favorably by Michael Stewart in Gramophone, November, 1993, p. 139.. Retrieved 21 June 2009.

Praised in particular Josef Protschka as Kalaf and Robert Wörle, Johann Werner Prein, and Gotthold Schwarz. Preferred Mechthild Gessendorf (in the Nagano recording, see next) to Albrecht's Linda Plech in the role of Turandot.

Reviewed by Antony Bye for BBC Music Magazine. Retrieved 20 June 2009.

Received 5/5 stars for performance and sound. "There's little to choose between the two recordings of Turandot."

Turandot (1917) BV 273

René Pape (Altoum); Linda Plech (Turandot); Gabriele Schreckenbach (Adelma); Josef Protschka (Kalaf); Friedrich Molsberger (Barak); Celina Lindsley (Queen Mother); Robert Wörle (Truffaldino); Johann Werner Prein (Pantalone); Gotthold Schwarz (Tartaglia)
RIAS Kammerchor
Berlin Radio Symphony Orchestra; Gerd Albrecht, conductor

Busoni. Arlecchino/Turandot. Kent Nagano

Virgin Classics VCD7 59313-2

Recorded Radio France Auditorium Maurice Ravel, Lyon, 22–26 February 1992 (Arlecchino); 1–4 August 1991 (Turandot).
Reviewed favorably in Gramophone, November, 1993, p. 139 (Retrieved 9 February 2009.)

Arlecchino (1916) BV 270

Ernst Theo Richter (Arlecchino); Suzanne Mentzer (Colombina); Thomas Mohr (Ser Matteo del Sarto); Wolfgang Holzmair (Abbate Cospicuo); Philippe Huttenlocher (Dottor Bombasto); Stefan Dahlberg (Leandro)
Chorus & Orchestra of the Opéra de Lyon; Kent Nagano, conductor

Turandot (1917) BV 273

Mechthild Gessendorf (Turandot); Stefan Dahlberg (Kalaf); Franz-Josef Selig (Altoum); Gabriele Sima (Adelma); Falk Struckman (Barak); Anne-Marie Rodde (Queen Mother); Markus Schäfer (Truffaldino); Michael Kraus (Pantalone); Wolfgang Holzmair (Tartaglia)
Chorus & Orchestra of the Opéra de Lyon; Kent Nagano, conductor

Busoni: Doktor Faust. Kent Nagano

Erato 3984-25501-2 (Warner Music prod. page. Retrieved 9 February 2009.])

Recorded: Opéra National de Lyon, Nov 1997 and Mar 1998
Plays with the Jarnach ending of the final scene, but the Beaumont version is included and can be used to replace the Jarnach version via a playlist or CD programming.
Recommended in 2008 Gramophone Guide

Praises the inclusion of the Beaumont completion of the second half of the final scene, but prefers Jarnach's more melodramatic ending, even though it does not accurately reflect Busoni's intentions. "Dietrich Henschel displays considerable style and stamina during his two extended monologues in the opera's final stages, and although his singing isn't entirely free of straining for effect, or of bluster, the character's tortured humanity is vividly conveyed." "Begley tackles the many demanding aspects of the part [of Mephistopheles] with panache and, in the scintillating ballad, wit and menace are in perfect balance."

Recommended in 2008 Penguin Guide

"Dietrich Henschel may not be a searching or weighty interpreter, but the clarity and incisiveness of his singing are most impressive, leading to a noble account of the death scene, one of the passages expanded in the Beaumont version. He is well contrasted with the powerful Mephistopheles of Kim Begley, a tenor role that is Wagnerian in its demands."

Reviewed by Joseph Horowitz in The New York Times, May 7, 2000. Retrieved 27 October 2009.

"This is in every way a thoughtful, conscientious and polished presentation, yet (alas) it feels small and tight." "FAUST and Mephistopheles are mega-roles. Faust ranges from existential turbulence to erotic bravado and terminal repose. Mr. Henschel sounds like a scaled-down version of Dietrich Fischer-Dieskau in the 1970 Deutsche Grammophon recording.... Busoni's Mephistopheles is cunning, edgy, commanding: a character-tenor with heft. Mr. Begley is merely a Loge. William Cochran, in the Leitner recording, applies a Siegmund voice to the part; the results are labored but properly formidable."

Doktor Faust (1924) BV 303

Dietrich Fischer-Dieskau (Poet); Dietrich Henschel (Doktor Faust); Markus Hollop (Wagner); Kim Begley (Mephistopheles); Torsten Kerl (The Duke of Parma); Eva Jenisova (The Duchess of Parma); Markus Hollop (The Master of Ceremonies); Detlef Roth (The girl's brother)
Chœur de l'Opéra National de Lyon
Chœur du Grand Théâtre de Genève
Orchestre de l'Opéra National de Lyon
Kent Nagano, conductor

Busoni: Doktor Faust. Ferdinand Leitner.

DG 427 4132 (DG prod. page; available as a digital download. Retrieved 27 April 2009.)

Analog version issued on LP in 1970; digital version released 6 April 1989.
Recommended in 1996 Penguin Guide.

Recording received 3 of 3 stars, high praise for the conducting of Leitner and the portrayal of Faust by Fischer-Dieskau, but there were reservations concerning Hildegard Hillebrecht as the Duchess of Parma and the many cuts in the score.

Review of original LP release by Lionel Salter in Gramophone, September, 1970, p. 463. (Retrieved 27 April 2009.)

Includes a fairly detailed description and analysis of the opera.

Reviewed by Michael Oliver in Gramophone, August, 1989, p. 362 (Retrieved 27 April 2009.)

Reservations about cuts: "12 passages are excised, 700 bars in all, including most of the church scene and its organ prelude, three fine orchestral passages (including the very beautiful transformation music before the vision of Helen of Troy) and the first three sections of the students' serenade."

Doktor Faust (1924) BV 303

Dietrich Fischer-Dieskau (Doktor Faust); William Cochran (Mephistopheles); Anton de Ridder (Duke of Parma); Hildegard Hillebrecht (Duchess of Parma); Karl-Christian Kohn (Wagner, Master of Ceremonies); Franz Grundheber (Soldier, Natural Philosopher); Manfred Schmidt (Lieutenant); Marius Rintzler (Jurist); Hans Sotin (Theologian)
Bavarian Radio Chorus and Symphony Orchestra; Ferdinand Leitner, conductor

Busoni: Doktor Faust. Philippe Jordan.

Arthaus Musik 101 283 (DVD) (Arthaus Musik prod. page. Retrieved 27 April 2009.])
Arthaus Musik 101 284 (Blu-ray Disc) (Arthaus Musik prod. page. Retrieved 27 April 2009.])

Recorded live Zurich Opera House, 2006.
Reviewed by Guy Rickards in Gramophone, March, 2008, p. 90 (Retrieved 27 April 2009.)

Rickards finds that Hampson gets off to a poor start, "but audibly grows into the role" and Gregory Kunde steals the show as Mephistopheles. He strongly criticizes the use of Jarnach's (as opposed to Beaumont's) completion of the final scene as a misrepresentation of Busoni's intentions, and says it "stylistically jars the moment it starts." He also objects to the omission of the Students' serenade to Wagner at the beginning of the final scene. "Wagner's replacement of Faust as Rector is included in the sung text and meaningless without its representation onstage. Musically, the cut section provides vital contrast between the defiance of the second scene's close and the denouement."

Doktor Faust (1924) BV 303

Thomas Hampson (Doktor Faust); Gunther Groissböck (Wagner, Master of Ceremonies); Gregory Kunde (Mephistopheles); Reinaldo Macias (Duke of Parma, Soldier); Sandra Tratmigg (Duchess of Parma); Martin Zysset (Lieutenant); Andreas Winkler (1st Student from Cracow) Thilo Dahlmann (2nd Student from Cracow); Matthew Leigh (3rd Student from Cracow); Giuseppe Scorsin (Gravis); Tomasz Slawinski (Levis); Gabriel Bermúdez (Asmodus); Randall Ball (Belzebuth); Miroslav Christoff (Megaros)
Zurich Opera House Chorus and Orchestra; Philippe Jordan, conductor

== Other sources ==
- Busoni discography up to 30 August 2005 at Vinylphil. Retrieved 27 April 2009.
