= Wolf Harden =

German pianist

Wolf Harden (born 1962 in Hamburg, West Germany) is a German classical pianist.

He started learning music with his father, a musicologist, and his mother, a pianist. He studied at the Detmold Music Academy, and began performing with the Trio Fontenay, which he founded in 1980. In 1982, Harden made his debut in Berlin, and in 1983, he made his first recording of the Liszt Dante sonata.

Harden has performed regularly in Europe, North and South America and Asia, both as a recitalist and with the Trio Fontenay. He also performs regularly with orchestras around the world. He has worked as accompanist for a number of singers, including Juliane Banse, Wolfgang Holzmair and Theo Adam, and with many instrumentalists, such as Kolja Blacher, Michael Goldstein, Kim Kashkashian and Giora Feidman.

Harden has recorded more than 50 CDs, as solo pianist, soloist with orchestra, and with the Trio Fontenay. He has recorded for the Teldec, Denon, Philips, cpo and Naxos labels. He has notably recorded (as of 2017) nine volumes of the complete piano music of Busoni, as well as works by Pfitzner, Nishizaki and Schumann. With the Trio Fontenay, he has recorded piano trios by Beethoven, Brahms, Chopin, Debussy, Dvořák, Haydn, Ives and many others.
