= Comedy Overture =

Concert overture by Ferruccio Busoni

Eine Lustspielouvertüre
- Concert overture by Ferruccio Busoni
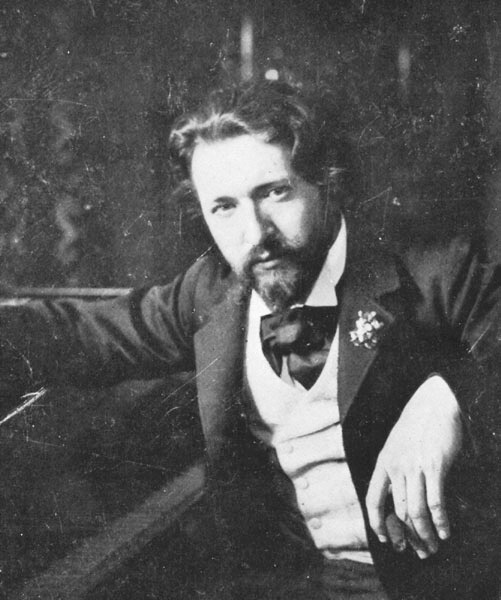
- The composer around 1900
- English: Comedy Overture
- Catalogue: BV 245
- Opus: 38
- Composed: 1897/1904

The Eine Lustspielouvertüre (Comedy Overture) Op. 38 (BV 245) for orchestra is a concert overture by Ferruccio Busoni; it was composed in 1897 and revised in 1904. The main theme appears at once, played by the strings. The second subject follows on clarinet. A new section introduces the development. In recapitulation the second theme is reworked for the cellos and contrabasses over a timpani pedal point. The work ends with a lively coda.

== Selected recordings ==
- NDR Symphony Orchestra; Werner Andreas Albert, conductor; CPO Records 999 161-2
- Philharmonia Orchestra; Adrian Boult, conductor; Classical Society CSCD 124
- BBC Philharmonic; Neeme Järvi, conductor; Chandos 10302
