= Gianluca Luisi =

Italian pianist (born 1970)

- Born: 1970 (age 55–56); Pescara, Italy
- Genres: Classical
- Occupation: Pianist
- Instrument: Piano
- Years active: 1990s–present
- Labels: OnClassical, Naxos, Arts, MDG
- Website: Official website

Gianluca Luisi (born 1970 in Pescara) is an Italian pianist known for his interpretations of J. S. Bach. whose complete The Well-Tempered Clavier he recorded. Luisi studied at the Rossini Conservatory in Pesaro under the guidance of Franco Scala and, later, at the piano Academy in Imola with Giovanni Valentini, Boris Petrushansky and Piero Rattalino. Luisi now teaches at the Recanati Piano Academy of the Marche.

== Awards ==
Luisi won many national and international Piano competitions including: the "Città dell’Aquila" and the Mozart prize (Italy) in 1996, the Genzano Competition in Rome (Italy) first prize, the Cesenatico Competition first prize (Italy), the Jeunesse musicales Competition (Italy) first prize (1998), the Torneo Internazionale di Musica, TIM (Roma), first prize (1999), and more.

He also won the second prize at the "Casella" International Competition in Naples and in 2001 he won the first prize in the "J.S.Bach Piano International Competition" in Saarbrücken, Germany (54 pianists from 26 countries took part).

== Concerts ==
Gianluca Luisi gave many concerts in important Concert Halls including the American Carnegie Hall, and in Italy, Germany, Austria, Luxemburg, Malta, Czechia, etc. He is regularly invited to give concerts in Nagoya, Japan.

== Recordings ==
He recorded several CDs for labels such as OnClassical, Naxos, Arts and MDG.
