= Nishizaki =

Nishizaki (written: 西崎 lit. "west peninsula") is a Japanese surname. Notable people with the surname include:

- Kiku Nishizaki (西崎 キク, 1912–1979), Japanese aviator
- Takako Nishizaki (西崎 崇子, born 1944), Japanese classical violinist
- Yoshinobu Nishizaki (西崎 義展, 1934–2010), Japanese film producer
