= Dmitry Paperno =

Dmitry Paperno Дмитро Паперно
- Born: 18 February 1929; Kiev, Ukrainian SSR, Soviet Union
- Died: 12 October 2020 (aged 91) Northbrook, Illinois, U.S.
- Genre: Classical
- Occupations: Pianist; Teacher
- Instrument: Piano

Dmitry Oleksandrovych Paperno (Note: Ukrainian: Дмитро Олександрович Паперно, romanized: Dmytro Oleksandrovych Paperno; Russian: Дмитрий Александрович Паперно, romanized: Dmitry Aleksandrovich Paperno) (18 February 1929 – 12 October 2020) was a Soviet and American concert pianist.

Paperno was born in Kyiv. In 1955, Paperno won 6th Prize in the V International Chopin Piano Competition, and then recorded and performed widely throughout the Soviet Union. He attended the Moscow Conservatory where he studied under Aleksandr Goldenweiser. Paperno recorded for Melodiya and prior to recording with Cedille Records. Paperno became a tenured professor at DePaul University after moving to the United States in 1976. He is the author of the book Notes of a Moscow Pianist. He died in 2020 in Northbrook, Illinois.
