= Altarus Records =

Classical music record label

Altarus Records is a classical music record label.

== Featured musicians ==
- Donna Amato, piano
- Joseph Banowetz, piano
- Kevin Bowyer, organ
- Elizabeth Farnum, soprano
- Carlo Grante, piano
- Marc-André Hamelin, piano
- Charles Hopkins, piano
- Lukas Huisman, piano
- Tellef Johnson, piano
- Margaret Kampmeier, piano
- Geoffrey Douglas Madge, piano
- Murray McLachlan, piano
- Soheil Nasseri, piano
- Eiji Nishimura, piano
- John Ogdon, piano
- Jonathan Powell, piano
- Abel Sánchez-Aguilera, piano
- Yonty Solomon, piano
- Ronald Stevenson, piano
- Fredrik Ullén, piano
- Adam Wodnicki, piano

== See also ==
- List of record labels
