= Ferruccio Busoni discography (as pianist) =

This article lists acoustic recordings made for Columbia by Ferruccio Busoni. The published recordings were issued on 78-rpm records. It is believed that the original matrices were destroyed in a fire at the Columbia factory in England in the 1920s. Copies of the original 78s still exist, and the recordings have been transferred to LP and CD. Some of the digital copies have been computer enhanced.

== List of acoustic recordings ==
Table 1. Recordings from 18–19 November 1919 at Columbia Studios, London.
The recordings from these earlier sessions were deemed unsatisfactory, were not issued, and are probably lost.

Composer	Work	Matrix/Take
Bach	Prelude and Fugue No.1 in C Major, BWV 846 (Well-Tempered Clavier, Book I)	76699-1, -2
Mozart	Andantino from Piano Concerto No.9 in E-flat major, KV 271 (BV B 84, excerpt)	76700-1, -2
Gounod-Liszt	Waltz from the opera Faust, S.407	76701-1, -2
Bach	Organ Chorale Prelude "Rejoice, Beloved Christians" BWV 734 (BV B 27)	76702-1, -2
Beethoven	Ecossaises (not identified further; probably BV B 47)	76702-1, -2
Chopin	Nocturne in F-sharp major, Op.15, No.2	76703-1, -2
Liszt	Hungarian Rhapsody No.13 in A minor S.244, Part 1 (abbreviated)	76704-1, -2
Liszt	Hungarian Rhapsody No.13 in A minor S.244, Part 2 (abbreviated)	76705-1, -2
Liszt	Années de Pèlerinage; Deuxième Année - Italie, S.161 No.6: Sonetto 123 del Petrarca	76706-1, -2
Liszt	Valse oubliée [No.1?, S.215]	76707-1, -2
Liszt	Etudes d'Exécution Transcendente d'après Paganini, S.140 No.5, "La Chasse"	76708-1, -2
Chopin	Etude in E minor, Op.25 No.5	76709-1, -2
Weber	Piano Sonata No.1 in C major, Op.24: Finale, Presto (Rondo, Perpetuum mobile)	76710-1, -2, -3

Table 2. Recordings from 27 February 1922 at Columbia Studios, London.

Composer	Work	Issue	Matrix/Take
Bach	Prelude and Fugue No.1 in C Major, BWV 846 (Well-Tempered Clavier, Book I)	L 1445	76699-3; 76699-4
Bach	Organ Chorale Prelude "Rejoice, Beloved Christians" BWV 734 (BV B 27)	L 1470	76702-3
Beethoven	Ecossaises, WoO 83 (BV B 47)	L 1470	76702-3
Chopin	Nocturne in F-sharp major, Op.15, No.2	L 1432	76703-3; 76703-4
Liszt	Hungarian Rhapsody No.13 in A minor S.244, Part 1 (abbreviated)	L 1456	76704-3; 76704-4
Liszt	Hungarian Rhapsody No.13 in A minor S.244, Part 2 (abbreviated)	L 1456	76705-3; 76705-4
Liszt	Années de Pèlerinage; Deuxième Année - Italie, S.161 No.6: Sonetto 123 del Petrarca		76706-3; 76706-4
Chopin	Etude in E minor, Op.25 No.5	L 1445	76709-3; 76709-4
Weber	Piano Sonata No.1 in C major, Op.24: Finale, Presto (Rondo, Perpetuum mobile)		76709-4; 76709-5
Beethoven	Ecossaises (not identified further; probably BV B 47)		75058-1
Bach	Prelude to Chorale (not identified further; probably BV B 27)		75058-1
Chopin	Etude in G-flat major, Op.10 No.5	L 1432	75059-1; 75059-2
Chopin	Prelude in A major, Op.28 No.7; Etude in G-flat major, Op.10 No.5	L 1470	75060-1; 75060-2

== Selected CD reissue ==
- Busoni and his Legacy: Piano recordings by Busoni • Ley • Petri

Arbiter 134 (CD; 72 min; ADD using "sonic depth technology"; issued 2002).
• Ferruccio Busoni (1866-1924): the complete 1922 recordings (L 1445, L 1470, L 1432, L 1456)
• Rosamond Ley (1882-1969):

• Liszt: Jeux d'eau a la Villa d'Este (rec. 1942)
• Liszt: Sonata après une lecture du Dante (rec. 1942)

• Egon Petri (1881-1962):

• Liszt: Totentanz (incomplete; first 78 missing; rec. 1936)
• Busoni: Piano Concerto, Movement 4 (recorded from a live broadcast 2 June 1932 with Hans Rosbaud, conductor)
