= Transcendental Étude (disambiguation) =

Transcendental Étude or Study, and similar titles, may refer to:

- Transcendental Études (1852), S.139, 12 studies for piano by Franz Liszt:

- Transcendental Étude No. 1 (Liszt)
- Transcendental Étude No. 2 (Liszt)
- Transcendental Étude No. 3 (Liszt)
- Transcendental Étude No. 4 (Liszt)
- Transcendental Étude No. 5 (Liszt)
- Transcendental Étude No. 6 (Liszt)
- Transcendental Étude No. 7 (Liszt)
- Transcendental Étude No. 8 (Liszt)
- Transcendental Étude No. 9 (Liszt)
- Transcendental Étude No. 10 (Liszt)
- Transcendental Étude No. 11 (Liszt)
- Transcendental Étude No. 12 (Liszt)

- 12 Transcendental Études (Lyapunov), (12 Études d'exécution transcendante) (1897–1905), Op. 11, for piano by Sergei Lyapunov
- Transcendental Studies (Sorabji) (Études transcendantes) (1940–44), 100 studies for piano by Kaikhosru Shapurji Sorabji
- Études transcendantales (1982–85), song cycle for mezzo-soprano and chamber ensemble by Brian Ferneyhough
- Studio Trascendentale ('Transcendental Étude'), Op. 102, by Adolfo Fumagalli

== See also ==
- Études (disambiguation)
- Étude, an instrumental musical composition
- Étude (instrumental), a 1984 single by Mike Oldfield
