= List of adaptations by Ferruccio Busoni =

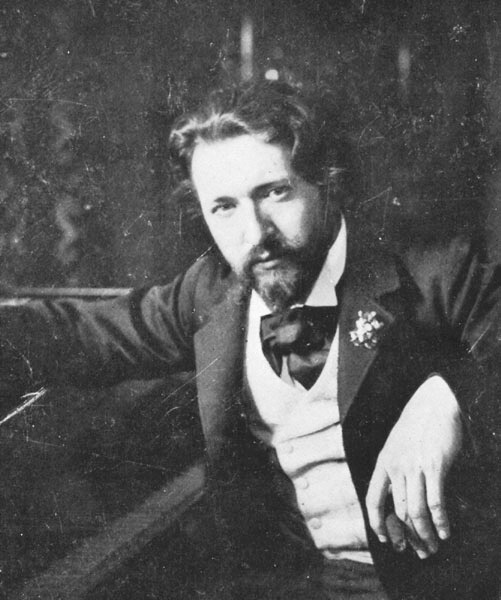
Ferruccio Busoni

The composer Ferruccio Busoni produced a large number of adaptations, transcriptions, and editions of works by other composers. He also wrote a number of cadenzas for compositions by other composers. This article presents a complete catalog of these works.

For a complete list of original compositions see Catalog of original compositions by Ferruccio Busoni. For a more selective list of recorded works, see Ferruccio Busoni discography (as composer).

== Cadenzas and transcriptions ==
The letters BV B (Busoni-Verzeichnis Bearbeitung [Busoni Catalog Adaptation]) followed by a number are used for the identification of Busoni's cadenzas and transcriptions. The BV B numbers are based on the first comprehensive catalog of Busoni's works prepared by Kindermann. The letters KiV B are also sometimes used. Although Kindermann himself did not specify any letter(s) to be used for referring to his catalog, he has agreed to the use of the abbreviation BV. The dates of composition are from Kindermann and Roberge. For many transcriptions, the date of composition could not be ascertained, and a date "at the latest" was used. This date was determined by the date of publication or first performance, or by some other means. These dates are marked with an asterisk (＊).

Abbreviations: acc., according to; arr., arrangement; SB, Staatsbibliothek zu Berlin; B&H, Breitkopf & Härtel, Leipzig (unless otherwise indicated); cat., catalog; ded., dedicated to; dur., duration; frag, fragment; fp, first performance; (score) or (♫), link to the score of Busoni's adaptation at the International Music Score Library Project; instr., instrumentation; MS, manuscript; pub., published; rev., revised; transcr., transcription or transcribed; unpub., unpublished.

=== Cadenzas (BV B 1 to 19) ===
- Note: This section is not yet complete. The "Details" column needs additional work.

Cat. no.	Composer	Title	Date(s) of composition	Details
BV B 1	Beethoven	Two cadenzas for Piano Concerto No. 4 in G major, Op. 58, (1st & 3rd movements) (score)	1890＊	pub, ded
BV B 2	Beethoven	Four cadenzas for Piano Concertos No. 1 in C major, Op. 15; No. 3 in C minor, Op. 37; and No. 4 in G major, Op. 58	1900	pub
BV B 3	Beethoven	Three cadenzas for the Violin Concerto in D major, Op. 61	1913	pub, ded
BV B 4	Beethoven	Cello cadenza for Busoni's transcription of Adelaide Op. 46, song for voice and piano (transcr. for cello and piano)	4 Jul 1915	unpub; see BV B 48
BV B 5	Brahms	Cadenza for the Violin Concerto, Op. 77	16 Sep 1913	pub, ded
BV B 6	Mozart	Cadenza for Piano Concerto No. 20 in D minor, K. 466	Childhood	unpub; lost
BV B 7	Mozart	Two cadenzas for Piano Concerto No. 20 in D minor, K. 466	1907, 1920	pub, fp, ded
BV B 8	Mozart	Two cadenzas for Piano Concerto No. 9 in E♭ major, K. 271	1915	pub, fp, ded
BV B 9	Mozart	Cadenza and coda for Piano Concerto No. 23 in A major, K. 488 (score)	Nov 1918	pub, fp
BV B 10	Mozart	Three cadenzas for Piano Concerto No. 24 in C minor, K. 491 (score)	1918	pub, fp
BV B 11	Mozart	Cadenza for the Flute Concerto No. 1 in G major, K. 313	1 Aug 1919	ded
BV B 12	Mozart	Cadenza for the Flute Concerto No. 2 in D major, K. 314	2 Aug 1919	ded
BV B 13	Mozart	Two cadenzas for Piano Concerto No. 21 in C major, K. 467	Oct 1919	pub, fp, ded
BV B 14	Mozart	Two cadenzas for Piano Concerto No. 22 in E♭ major, K. 482	26, 29 Oct 1919	pub
BV B 15	Mozart	Two cadenzas for Piano Concerto No. 19 in F major, K. 459	22, 25 Dec 1920	pub
BV B 16	Mozart	Two cadenzas for Piano Concerto No. 17 in G major, K. 453	29 Aug 1921	pub, fp, ded
BV B 17	Mozart	Cadenza for the Sonata for Two Pianos in D major, K. 448	16 Nov 1921	SB335, unpub, fp
BV B 18	Mozart	Cadenza for Piano Concerto No. 25 in C major, K. 503	9 Jun 1922	ms, pub
BV B 19	Weber	Two Cadenzas for the Clarinet Concerto No. 1 in F minor, Op. 73	18 May 1920	ms, unpub, ded

=== Transcriptions (BV B 20 to 115) ===
- Note: This section is not yet complete. The "Details" column needs additional work.

These works are transcribed for piano solo, unless otherwise indicated.

Cat. no.	Composer	Title	Date(s) of adaptation	Details
BV B 20	Bach	Prelude and Fugue in D major for organ, BWV 532 (♫)	1888	pub, fp, ded
BV B 21	Bach	Chorale Prelude Aus tiefer Not schrei ich zu dir for organ, BWV 686	1880s	unpub
BV B 22	Bach	Prelude and Fugue in E♭ major for organ, BWV 552 (♫)	1890?	pub, fp, ded
BV B 23	Bach	Inventions and Sinfonias for harpsichord: 15 Inventions, BWV 772–786 (♫); 15 Sinfonias, BWV 787–801 (♫)	1891, 1914	pub, ded
BV B 24	Bach	Chaconne in D minor from Partita No. 2 for violin, BWV 1004 (♫)	1893＊	pub, fp, ded, arr
BV B 25	Bach	The Well-Tempered Clavier for harpsichord: Book I, BWV 846–869 (♫); Book II, BWV 870–893 (♫)	1894, 1915	pub
BV B 26	Bach	Prelude and Fugue in E minor for organ, BWV 533 (♫)	1894＊	pub
BV B 27	Bach	Ten Chorale Preludes for organ (♫): 1. Komm, Gott, Schöpfer, BWV 667; 2. Wachet auf, ruft uns die Stimme, BWV 645; 3. Nun komm' der Heiden Heiland, BWV 659; 4. Nun freut euch, lieben Christen, BWV 734; 5. Ich ruf' zu dir, Herr Jesu Christ, BWV 639; 6. Herr Gott, nun schleuß' den Himmel auf, BWV 617; 7. Durch Adam's Fall: a. BWV 637 b. Fuga, BWV 705; 8. In dir ist Freude, BWV 615; 9. Jesus Christus, unser Heiland, BWV 665	1898＊	pub, fp, ded
BV B 28	Bach	Concerto for harpsichord and strings No. 1 in D minor, BWV 1052, transcribed for piano and orchestra	1899＊	pub, fp, ded, arr, see BVB 30
BV B 29	Bach	Two Toccatas and Fugues for organ: 1. Toccata, Adagio and Fugue in C major, BWV 564 (♫); 2. Toccata and Fugue in D minor, BWV 565 (♫)	Jun 1899	pub, fp, ded
BV B 30	Bach	Concerto for harpsichord and strings No. 1 in D minor, BWV 1052, transcribed for two pianos (♫)	1900＊	pub, fp, ded, arr. of BV B 28
BV B 31	Bach	Chromatic Fantasia and Fugue for harpsichord, BWV 903 (♫)	1902＊	pub, fp
BV B 32	Bach	Twelve Little Preludes, published for keyboard in BGA Vol. 36, p. 119ff (No. 3 originally for lute; BWV 939–942 possibly not composed by Bach): 1. BWV 924 (♫); 2. BWV 939 (♫); 3. BWV 999 (♫); 4. BWV 925 (♫); 5. BWV 926 (♫); 6. BWV 940 (♫); 7. BWV 941 (♫); 8. BWV 927 (♫); 9. BWV 928 (♫); 10. BWV 929 (♫); 11. BWV 930 (♫); 12. BWV 942 (♫); Six Little Preludes, BWV 933–938 (♫); Fughetta, BWV 961 (♫)	May 1914	pub
BV B 33	Bach	Four Duets for organ and/or keyboard from Clavier-Übung III, BWV 802-805 (♫)	Jun 1914	pub
BV B 34	Bach	Capriccio on the departure of a beloved brother in B♭ major for harpsichord, BWV 992 (♫)	Jul 1914	pub, fp, ded
BV B 35	Bach	Goldberg Variations for harpsichord, BWV 988 (♫)	Aug 1914	pub, fp, ded
BV B 36	Bach	Prelude, Fugue and Allegro in E♭ major for solo lute, BWV 998 (♫)	1914＊	pub, fp, ded
BV B 37	Bach	Fantasia, Adagio e Fuga (♫), after: 1. Fantasy for harpsichord BWV 906/1; 2. Adagio for harpsichord BWV 968; 3. Fugue for harpsichord BWV 906/2 (completed by Busoni)	1915＊	pub, fp
BV B 38	Bach	Chromatic Fantasia and Fugue for harpsichord, BWV 903, transcribed for cello and piano	1915	pub, ded
BV B 39	Bach	Three Toccatas for keyboard or organ: 1. in E minor, BWV 914; 2. in G minor, BWV 915; 3. in G major, BWV 916	Aug 1916	pub, ded
BV B 40	Bach	Canonic Variations and Fugue, selected from The Musical Offering, BWV 1079	Sep 1916	pub, ded
BV B 41	Bach	Fantasy and Fugue in A minor for harpsichord, BWV 904	1917	pub, ded
BV B 42	Bach	Fantasie, Fuge, Andante und Scherzo (♫), after following doubtful works for keyboard (all of them in Anh. II in BWV^{2a}): 1. Fantasia and Fugue in D minor, BWV 905; 2. Andante in G minor, BWV 969; 3. Scherzo in D minor, BWV 844	1917	pub
BV B 43	Bach	Sarabande con Partite in C major (doubtful) for harpsichord, BWV 990 (♫)	1921	pub
BV B 44	Bach	Aria variata alla maniera italiana in A minor for harpsichord, BWV 989 (♫)	1921	pub
BV B 45	Bach	Chaconne in D minor from Partita No. 2 for violin, BWV 1004, transcribed for orchestra	not known	SB212 (sketches), unpub, instr
BV B 46	Bach	Two Chorale Preludes for organ	not known	ms (sketches, frag), unpub
BV B 47	Beethoven	Écossaises for piano, WoO 83 (score)	1888	pub, fp, ded
BV B 48	Beethoven	Adelaide, Op. 47. Song for voice and piano (transcr. for cello and piano)	1915	ms (lost), unpub, ded, arr, see BV B 4
BV B 49	Beethoven	"Benedictus" from the Missa Solemnis (transcr. for violin and orchestra), Op. 123	1916	pub, arr
BV B 50	Brahms	Six Chorale Preludes for organ, Op. 122	1902	pub, fp
BV B 51	Chopin	Polonaise in A♭ major for piano, Op. 53	1909	pub, ded
BV B 52	Cornelius	Fantasie über Motive aus "Der Barbier von Bagdad" (opera)	Dec 1886	MS, pub
BV B 53	Cramer	Eight Etudes for piano	1897＊	pub, ded
BV B 54	Gade	Novelette for piano, violin, and cello, Op. 29 (transcr. for 2 pianos)	1889＊	
BV B 55	Goldmark	Concert Fantasy on Motives from "Merlin" for piano (score)	May 1887	pub
BV B 56	Goldmark	Merlin: Opera in Three Acts	1888＊	pub
BV B 57	Liszt	Coeli enarrant: Psalm 18 (S.14) for male chorus and orchestra (transcr. for two pianos four hands)	1880s	SB203 (frag), unpub.
BV B 58	Liszt	Rhapsodie espagnole (Folies d'Espagne et Jota aragonese) (S.254) for piano (transcr. for piano and orchestra)	1894＊	pub, instr, fp, ded, arr
BV B 59	Liszt	Fantasy and Fugue on the Chorale "Ad nos, ad salutarem undam" (S.259) for organ (score)	1897＊	pub, fp, ded
BV B 60	Liszt	Hungarian Rhapsody No. 20 (S.242, no. 20) for piano	ca. 1900	MS, unpub.
BV B 61	Liszt	Mephisto Waltz from Deux Épisodes d'apres le Faust de Lenau (S.110 no. 2) for orchestra (score)	Mar 1904	pub, fp, ded
BV B 62	Liszt	Heroic March in Hungarian Style (S.231) for piano	1905＊	pub, ded
BV B 63	Liszt	Sonetto 104 di Petrarca: "Pace non trovo" (S.270, no. 1) for tenor and piano (transcr. for tenor and orchestra)	Dec 1907	pub, instr, fp, ded
BV B 64	Liszt	Polonaise No. 2 in E major (S.223) for piano	1909＊	pub, ded
BV B 65	Liszt	Saint François d'Assise: La Prédication aux oiseaux (S.175, no. 1) for piano (score)	ca. 1910	MS (lost)
BV B 66	Liszt	Fantasy on Two Motives from W. A. Mozart's "Le Nozze di Figaro" (S.697) for piano (score)	11 Jul 1912	pub, fp, ded
BV B 67	Liszt	Etude No. 6 (in A minor) after Paganini (S.141, no. 6) for piano (score)	1 Aug 1913	ms, pub, ded
BV B 68	Liszt	Etude No. 3 "La Campanella" (in G♯ minor) after Paganini (S.141, no. 3) for piano (score)	1915	pub, ded
BV B 69	Liszt	Valse oubliée No. 1 (S.215) for piano (transcr. for cello and piano)	1915	pub: B&H, 1917
BV B 70	Liszt	Etude No. 2 (in E♭ major) after Paganini (S.141, no. 2) for piano (score)	22 Sep 1916	pub
BV B 71	Liszt	Réminiscences de Don Juan (S.420) for piano (score)	9 Jun 1917	pub, ded
BV B 72	Liszt	Totentanz (S.126) for piano and orchestra	21 Nov 1918	pub, ded
BV B 73	Liszt	Hungarian Rhapsody No. 19 for piano	1920＊	pub
BV B 74	Liszt	Etude No. 4 (in E major) after Paganini (S.141, no. 4) for piano (score)	1921＊	pub
BV B 75	Liszt	Etude No. 1 (in G minor) after Paganini (S.141, no. 1) for piano (score)	1923＊	
BV B 76	Liszt	Etude No. 5 (in E major) after Paganini (S.141, no. 5) "La Chasse" for piano (score)	20 May 1923	ms, pub
BV B 77	Mendelssohn	Symphony No. 1 in C minor, Op. 11 (transcr. for two pianos eight hands) (score)	1890＊	pub
BV B 78	Mozart	Symphony No. 30 in D major, K. 202	1888＊	pub
BV B 79	Mozart	Symphony No. 32 in G major, K. 318	1888＊	pub
BV B 80	Mozart	Symphony No. 37 in G major, K. 444	1888＊	pub
BV B 81	Mozart	Overture to "Die Entführung aus dem Serail," K. 384 (transc. for orchestra; concert ending)	1904＊	pub, ded, fp
BV B 82	Mozart	Overture to "Don Giovanni," K. 527 (transc. for orchestra; concert ending)	1904＊	pub, fp
BV B 83	Mozart	Overture to "Die Zauberflöte," K. 620 (transc. for pianola)	ca. 1908	ms (lost)
BV B 84	Mozart	Andantino from the Piano Concerto No. 9 in E♭ major, K. 271 (score)	1913＊	pub, ded, fp
BV B 85	Mozart	Concert Suite from "Idomeneo," K. 366 (transcr. for orchestra)	1918	pub, ded, instr
BV B 86	Mozart	Piano Concerto No. 22 in E♭ major, K. 482	1919	SB310 (lost)
BV B 87	Mozart	Rondo concertante after the Finale of the Piano Concerto No. 22 in E♭ major, K. 482 (transcr. for piano and orchestra)	Dec 1919	SB312, pub
BV B 88	Mozart	Duettino concertante after the Finale of the Piano Concerto No. 19 in F major, K. 459 (transcr. for two pianos four hands) (score)	Dec 1919	SB313, pub, fp
BV B 89	Mozart	Sonata in D major, K. 448 and Fugue in C minor, K. 426 for two pianos four hands	1921	ms (lost)?
BV B 90	Mozart	Adagio from the Concerto for Clarinet and Orchestra in A major, K. 622 (transcr. for clarinet and orchestra)	1920＊	pub, ded, fp
BV B 91	Mozart	Fantasy in F minor for a Mechanical Clock, K. 608 (transc. for two pianos four hands)	23 Jan 1922	pub, ded, fp
BV B 92	Mozart	Piano Concerto No. 17 in G major, K. 453 (transcr. for piano and orchestra)	1922	SB341, unpub
BV B 93	Mozart	Overture to "Die Zauberflöte," K. 620 (transcr. for two pianos four hands)	3 Jun 1923	pub
BV B 94	Mozart	Fugue from the String Quartet in C minor, K. 546	ca. 1888	SB259 (frag)
BV B 95	Nováček, O.	Scherzo from the String Quartet No. 1 in E minor	1892＊	pub, ded
BV B 96	Nováček, R.	Waltz Suite	ca. 1905	ms (lost)
BV B 97	Schoenberg	Piano Piece, Op. 11, no. 2	26 Jul 1909	pub
BV B 98	Schubert	Overture to "Der Teufel als Hydraulicus," D. 4	1888＊	B&H, 1888
BV B 99	Schubert	Overture in D major for orchestra, D. 26	1888＊	B&H, 1888
BV B 100	Schubert	Overture in B♭ major for orchestra, D. 470	1888＊	B&H, 1888
BV B 101	Schubert	Five Minuets with Six Trios and Minuet for Two Violins, Viola, and Cello, D. 89	1888＊	B&H, 1888
BV B 102	Schubert	Five German Dances with Coda and Seven Trios for Two Violins, Viola, and Cello, D. 90	1888＊	B&H, 1888
BV B 103	Schubert	Overture in D major for Orchestra, D. 556	1889＊	B&H, 1889
BV B 104	Schubert	Overture in E minor for Orchestra, D. 648	1889＊	B&H, 1889
BV B 105	Schubert	Overture in the Italian Style in D major, D. 590	1889＊	B&H, 1889
BV B 106	Schubert	Overture in the Italian Style in D major, D. 591	1889＊	B&H, 1889
BV B 107	Schumann	Abendlied, Op. 85 No. 12, for piano four hands (transcr. for clarinet and string quartet)	1878–81	SB169, pub.
BV B 108	Schumann	Three Romances for oboe, Op. 94 (transcr. for clarinet)	1879–81	SB170, unpub.
BV B 109	Schumann	Concert Allegro in D minor for piano and orchestra, Op. 134 (transcr. for two pianos four hands)	1888＊	B&H, 1888
BV B 110	Spohr, Ernst	Introduction (Spohr) and Elegy (Ernst) (transcr. for clarinet and string quartet)	1879–81	SB168, unpub.
BV B 111	Wagner	"Siegfried's Funeral March" from "Götterdämmerung"	1883	pub, fp
BV B 112	Weill	"Ach wär' mein Lieb ein Brünnlein" from "Frauentanz: Sieben Gedichte des Mittelalters" for soprano, with flute, viola, clarinet, horn, and bassoon, Op. 10 (transcr. for soprano and piano)	1923 or 1924	pub, ded
BV B 113	(Unidentified)	Fugue (in A minor) for organ (ascribed to Bach by Busoni)	1888	SB214, unpub.
BV B 114	Liszt	Scherzo in G minor for piano (ed. by Busoni)	5 Apr 1909	ms, pub
BV B 115	Liszt	Tarantelle di bravura after the Tarantelle from Auber's "La Muette de Portici," S. 386 (inscribed with Busoni's interpretative markings)	(date unknown)	SB: N. Mus. Nachl. 4, 88

== Klavierübung ==
The Klavierübung is a compilation of exercises, transcriptions, and original compositions by Busoni, with which he hoped to pass on his accumulated knowledge of keyboard technique. It was issued in five parts between 1918 and 1922, and a second edition was published posthumously in 1925.

== Bach Editions ==
Busoni's Bach editions are a series of publications containing primarily transcriptions of keyboard music by Johann Sebastian Bach. They also include performance suggestions, practice exercises, musical analysis, an essay on the art of transcribing Bach's organ music for piano, an analysis of the fugue from Beethoven's 'Hammerklavier' sonata, and other related material. The later editions also include free adaptations and original compositions by Busoni which are based on the music of Bach.

== Liszt Editions ==
In the 1890s Busoni began to study Liszt's scores more intensively, including them more and more in his concert performances and collecting an extensive library of Liszt editions. By 1900 even Liszt's pupils were beginning to declare Busoni a true disciple. His reputation as a Liszt scholar and advocate grew to such an extent that in 1907 Busoni was invited to join the editorial board appointed to oversee to the publication of Liszt's collected works. Between 1901 and 1936 the Franz Liszt-Stiftung [Franz Liszt Foundation] supervised the publication (by Breitkopf & Härtel) of 34 volumes. Of these, Busoni edited three: II.1, II.2, and II.3. These three consist of the studies S.136–145 and S.420. The goal of the Liszt-Stiftung edition was scholarly, and Busoni adhered faithfully to this policy. Only in Volume II.1 did he even include any ossias, each labelled with "F.B." in small print.

=== Franz Liszt-Stiftung Edition ===
- Franz Liszt Musikalische Werke. Herausgegeben von der Franz Liszt-Stiftung. II. Pianofortewerke. Etüden für Pianoforte zu zwei Händen. Bd. 1–3 [Franz Liszt Musical Works. Published by the Franz Liszt Foundation. Etudes for piano two hands. Vols. 1–3.]

•Note: The English titles listed under contents are from the original edition. The title information in parentheses is not part of the original title and is provided for reference only.

Volume II.1:

Leipzig: Breitkopf & Härtel; n.d. (1910?); cat. no. F.L. 32-34; (10 pages foreword; 157 pages score).
•Note: Busoni wrote the foreword which is dated 1910.
•Contents:

Study in 12 exercises Op. 1 (first version of Transcendental Etudes, S.136)
12 great Studies (second version of Transcendental Etudes, S.137)
Mazeppa (first version, S.138)

Volume II.2:

Leipzig: Breitkopf & Härtel; [1911]; cat. no. F.L. 35-36; (129 pages score; 2 pages of notes by Busoni).
•Contents:

Bravour-Studies (final version of Transcendental Etudes, S.139)
Great Fantasia di Bravura on Paganini's Campanella, Op. 2 (Grande Fantaisie de bravoure sur La Clochette, S.420)

Volume II.3:

Leipzig: Breitkopf & Härtel; n.d. (1911?); cat. no. F.L. 37-43; (4 pages editor's note; 155 pages score).
•Note: The editor's note is dated December 1911.
•Contents:

Bravour-Studies after Paganini's Caprices (first version of Paganini Etudes, S.140)
Grand Etudes after Paganini (final versions, S.141)
Morceau de Salon, Etude of Perfection from the Method of Methods (early version of Ab Irato, S.142)
Ab Irato, Great Etude of Perfection (final version, S.143)
Three Concert Studies (S.144)
Gnome-Dance (No. 2 of S.145)
In the Woods (No. 1 of S.145)

•Ref: Kindermann, p. 467; Sitsky, pp. 215–216; Roberge, p. 63.

=== Paganini Etudes ===
- Sechs Paganini Etüden für Klavier. Revidierte Ausgabe von Ferruccio Busoni [Six Paganini Etudes for Piano. Revised edition by Ferruccio Busoni]

Leipzig: Breitkopf & Härtel; [1912]; cat. no. E.B. 484; (43 pages). Also published separately as cat. nos. 2551-56 (9, 8, 11, 4, 7, and 11 pages, respectively).
•Note: This scholarly edition of Liszt's definitive versions (S.141) is reprinted exactly as in Vol. II.3 of the Stiftung edition. These versions should not be confused with Busoni's concert arrangements of the same works in which Liszt's music has sometimes been significantly altered and which have been assigned the catalog numbers BV B 75 (No. 1), BV B 70 (No. 2), BV B 68 (No. 3), BV B 74 (No. 4), BV B 76 (No. 5), and BV B 67 (No. 6).
•Ref: Kindermann, p. 467; Sitsky, p. 216; Roberge, p. 63.

=== Selected Piano Works ===
- Ausgewählte Klavierwerke aus den von der Franz Liszt-Stiftung herausgegebenen Musikalischen Werken Franz Liszts, herausgegeben von Ferruccio Busoni [Selected Piano Works from the Franz Liszt Musical Works published by the Franz Liszt Foundation, edited by Ferruccio Busoni]

Leipzig: Breitkopf & Härtel; [1917]; cat. nos. E.B. 5011 (9 pages); 5013 (11 pages); 5017 (9 pages); 5019 (11 pages); 5022 (9 pages).
•Contents:

Abendklänge (Harmonies du soir, No. 11 of the final version of Transcendental Etudes, S.139)
La Campanella (Paganini Etude No. 3 in G♯ minor, S.141)
Gnomenreigen (Gnome-Dance, S.145)
Konzertetüde Nr. 3 in Des-Dur (Concert Etude No.3 in D♭ major, S.144)
Waldesrauschen (Forest Murmurs, No. 1 of Two Concert Studies, S.145)

•Ref: Kindermann, p. 467.

=== Dover reprints ===
The Searle numbers and other information following the page numbers are not part of the original Dover Contents, and are added here for reference.

- Complete Etudes for Solo Piano, Series I: Including the Transcendental Etudes. Edited by Ferruccio Busoni

New York: Dover Publications, 1988. ISBN 0-486-25815-7
•Note: Reprint of Vol. II.1 and the first part of Vol. II.2 (S.139) of the Franz Liszt Stiftung edition.

•Contents:

Foreword, pp. v–xi. (by Ferruccio Busoni, Berlin, 1910; translated into English by Rosamond Ley)

Editorial Notes, pp. xiii–xv. (by Ferruccio Busoni; translated into English by Rosamond Ley)

Etude en 12 Exercises [Etude in 12 Exercises], Op. 1 (1826), pp. 1–33. (S.136) (score)

No. 1 in C major, 1. No. 2 in A minor, 3. No. 3 in F major, 5. No. 4 in D minor, 8. No. 5 in B♭ major, 10. No. 6 in G minor, 14. No. 7 in E♭ major, 16. No. 8 in C minor, 18. No.9 in A♭ major, 21. No. 10 in F minor, 24. No. 11 in D♭ major, 27. No. 12 in B♭ minor, 31.

12 Grandes Etudes [12 Large Etudes] (1837) (dedicated to Carl Czerny), pp. 34–149. (S.137) (score)

No. 1 in C major, 34. No. 2 in A minor, 36. No. 3 in F major, 41. No. 4 in D minor, 46. No. 5 in B♭ major, 58. No. 6 in G minor, 68. No. 7 in E♭ major, 78. No. 8 in C minor, 88. No. 9 in A♭ major, 105. No. 10 in F minor, 116. No. 11 in D♭ major, 128. No. 12 in B♭ minor, 139.

Mazeppa (1840) (dedicated to Victor Hugo, pp. 150–147. (S.138) (score)

Etudes d'Exécution Transcendante [Etudes for Transcendental Technique, or Transcendental Etudes] (1851) (dedicated to Carl Czerny, pp. 158–255. (S.139) (score)

1: Preludio (C major), 158. 2: (A minor), 160. 3: Paysage [Landscape] (F major), 165. 4: Mazeppa (D minor), 168. 5: Feux Follets [Will-o'-the-Wisp] (B♭ major), 181. 6: Vision (G minor), 190. 7: Eroica (E♭ major), 200. 8: Wilde Jagd [Wild Hunt] (C minor), 206. 9: Ricordanza [Remembrance] (A♭ major), 217. 10: (F minor), 228. 11: Harmonies du Soir [Evening Harmonies] (D♭ major), 238. 12: Chasse-Neige [Snow-Drifting Wind] (B♭ minor), 246.

- Complete Etudes for Solo Piano, Series II: Including the Paganini Etudes and Concert Etudes. Edited by Ferruccio Busoni

New York: Dover Publications, 1988. ISBN 0-486-25816-5
•Note: Reprint of the second part of Vol. II.2 (S.420) and Vol. II.3 of the Franz Liszt Stiftung edition.

•Contents:

Editorial Notes, pp. v–vii. (by Ferruccio Busoni; translated into English by Rosamond Ley)

"Grande Fantaisie de Bravoure sur La Clochette de Paganini [Large Bravura Fantasy on Paganini's La Campanella], Op. 2 (1832)", pp. 1–30. (S.420) (score)

Etudes d'Exécution Transcendante d'après Paganini [Etudes for Transcendental Technique after Paganini] (1838) (dedicated to Clara Schumann), pp. 31–90. (S.140) (score)

Preludio, 31. 1 (G minor), 32. 2 (E♭ major), 43. 3: La Campanella (A♭ minor/major), 51. 4 (E major) Version I, 59; Version II, 65. 5: La Chasse [The Hunt] (E major), 72. 6: Theme and Variations (A minor), 81.

Grandes Etudes de Paganini [Paganini Etudes] (dedicated to Clara Schumann), pp. 91–132. (S.141) (score)

1 (G minor), 91. 2 (E♭ major), 99. 3: La Campanella (G♯ minor), 106. 4 (E major), 115. 5: La Chasse (E major), 118. 6 (A minor), 123.

Morceau de Salon: Etude de Perfectionnement [Salon Piece: Finishing Etude] (1840), pp. 133–136. (S.142) (score)

Ab Irato: Grande Etude de Perfectionnement [Ab Irato: Large Finishing Etude] (1852), pp. 137–143. (S.143) (score)

Trois Etudes de Concert [Three Concert Etudes] (c. 1848) (dedicated to Eduard Liszt), pp. 143–168. (S.144) (score)

No. 1 in A♭ major, 143. No. 2 in F minor, 152. No. 3 in D♭ major, 160.

Two Concert Etudes (c. 1862–63) (dedicated to Dionys Pruckner), pp. 169–184. (S.145) (score)

Gnomenreigen [Dance of the Gnomes], 169. Waldesrauschen [Forest Rustling], 177.

== Biographical notes ==
- Eduard Liszt (1817–1879), the youngest son of Franz Liszt's grandfather and the stepbrother of Franz Liszt's father. Eduard handled Franz Liszt's business affairs for more than thirty years until Eduard's death in 1879.
- Rosamond Ley (1883–1969), was a pianist and writer on music. She translated Busoni's Letters to his Wife and The Essence of Music into English.

== Notes ==
* The date of composition could not be ascertained, and a date "at the latest" is used (Roberge, p. xix).
