= List of Nodame Cantabile episodes =

Nodame Cantabile Japanese DVD volume 1 cover

Nodame Cantabile (Japanese: のだめカンタービレ, Hepburn: Nodame Kantābire) is an anime series adapted from the manga written and illustrated by Tomoko Ninomiya, which has been serialized by Kodansha in the biweekly josei (aimed at younger adult women) manga magazine Kiss since January 2001, with publication ongoing, and collected in 21 bound volumes as of August 2008. It received the 2004 Kodansha Manga Award for shōjo manga, and is licensed in North America by Del Rey Manga, in France by Pika Édition, in Thailand by NED Comics, in Indonesia by Elex Media Komputindo, and in Taiwan by Tong Li Comics.

The series was animated by J.C.Staff and produced by Fuji TV, comprising three seasons to date, with an original video animation (OVA) released 10 August 2009. The first season, called just Nodame Cantabile, was directed by Kenichi Kasai and the second season, called Nodame Cantabile: Paris Chapter, by Chiaki Kon. Both seasons starred Ayako Kawasumi as Megumi "Nodame" Noda and Tomokazu Seki as Shinichi Chiaki. Several works of classical music were featured in each episode under the musical direction of Suguru Matsutani. The orchestral music was performed by Nodame Orchestra, which consisted of members specially selected for the live-action drama of Nodame Cantabile, with professional support from the Tokyo Metropolitan Symphony Orchestra. The opening theme of season one was "Allegro Cantabile" by Suemitsu & The Suemith, and the ending themes were "Konna ni Chikaku de..." by Crystal Kay (episodes 1–12), "Sagittarius" by Suemitsu & the Nodame Orchestra (episodes 13–22), and "Allegro Cantabile" by Suemitsu & The Suemith (episode 23). The opening theme for the second season was "Sky High" by The Gospellers (with melody taken from the Third movement (Allegro scherzando) of Rachmaninoff's Piano Concerto No. 2), and the ending theme was "Tokyo et Paris" (東京 et Paris; lit. 'Tokyo and Paris') by Emiri Miyamoto x solita (with variations on the theme from Ravel's Boléro). The opening theme for season three was "Manazashi ☆ Daydream" by Yuu Sakai (with a variation on Jesu, Joy of Man's Desiring from the cantata Herz und Mund und Tat und Leben, BWV 147 by J.S. Bach), and the ending theme was "Kaze to Oka no Ballad" by Real Paradis with Nodame Orchestra.

The series aired on Fuji TV and associated stations in the Noitamina time slot. The first season was broadcast in 23 episodes from 11 January to 28 June 2007, and the second season was broadcast in 11 episodes from 8 October 2008 to 18 December 2008. The opening episode of season one broke the record for audience share for its time-slot.

The first season was released on 8 DVDs between April and November 2007. The first DVD volume debuted at number 3 on the Oricon chart for anime the week it went on sale. A box set was released in February 2008 with an additional 15-minute original video animation (OVA), taking place between episodes 8 and 9. An English Dub of this Series is being aired all over Asia on Animax Asia since July 7, 2010.

== Episode list ==
=== Nodame Cantabile ===
No.	Title	Directed by	Written by	Original release date	English Airdate
1	"Lesson 1"	Noriaki Akitaya	Tomoko Konparu	January 11, 2007	July 7, 2010
Popular piano student Shinichi Chiaki has almost given up his dream of becoming a conductor because his international career prospects are crippled by his fear of flying. His despair affects his playing, and he is transferred to a different teacher, Hajime Tanioka, who specializes in failing students. Tanioka introduces him to eccentric fellow student, Megumi "Nodame" Noda, and assigns them a Mozart sonata for two pianos. Chiaki quickly learns that while Nodame is capable of playing in a beautiful cantabile style, she can be sloppy and is a poor sight reader, preferring to learn by listening. After the two discover they are neighbors, Chiaki learns she is also very messy, and to his irritation finds himself cleaning her apartment and cooking her dinner. As they practice, he realizes she performs better when allowed to interpret loosely, and her joy in music when they perform for Tanioka inspires him to resume pursuing becoming a conductor. To his dismay, however, Nodame has fallen in love with him. Pieces featured: Introduction and Rondo capriccioso by Saint-Saëns, "Allegro con brio" from Symphony No.7 by Beethoven, Piano Concerto No. 5 "Emperor" by Beethoven, "Adagio cantabile" from Piano Sonata No. 8 by Beethoven, and Sonata for Two Pianos in D major by Mozart.
2	"Lesson 2"	Yoshitaka Koyama	Tomoko Konparu	January 18, 2007	July 8, 2010
After Chiaki quits as violinist Ryutaro Mine's piano accompanist for his juried exam, Mine is on the verge of quitting classical music for rock music using an electric violin. When he meets Nodame by chance, he asks her to be his accompanist. While he finds their playing together exhilarating, Nodame feels something is off, and asks Chiaki's advice. He points out that Mine is a strong soloist but does not pay attention to other players. Armed with this, Nodame insists that she and Mine practice more rigorously. Meanwhile, Nodame takes Mine's advice and tries to attract Chiaki's attention by dressing sexily. However, Chiaki is horrified by her excessive makeup, and Nodame catches a cold after wearing a slinky dress in winter. Chiaki substitutes as Mine's accompanist, and plays to match Mine's style. Mine passes his exam and quits his rock band, having decided to commit to classical music. Pieces featured: Violin Sonata No. 5 "Spring" by Beethoven, Introduction and Rondo capriccioso by Saint-Saëns, Symphony No. 7 by Beethoven.
3	"Lesson 3: Queen of Percussion"; Transliteration: "Lesson 3 Dagakki no Joō" (Japanese: Lesson 3 打楽器の女王)	Shigeru Ueda	Miho Maruo	January 25, 2007	July 9, 2010
Timpanist Masumi Okuyama, an admirer of Chiaki, is jealous of Nodame's relationship with him and begins tormenting her with pranks. Mine suggests a contest: who can get a date with Chiaki on Christmas Eve. Masumi attempts to impress Chiaki during orchestra practice but is thrown out for showing off. Nodame asks Chiaki out while he is distracted composing music, and he later denies saying yes. Nodame suggests in consolation that she, Masumi, and Mine play together. Meanwhile, Chiaki finally remembers having said yes to Nodame. Feeling honor-bound to at least give her a proper refusal, he finds her, Masumi, and Mine practicing a jazz arrangement of his music, based on Nodame's hearing it once. He joins their ensemble, and forces them to rehearse late on Christmas Eve. Piece featured: Symphony No. 3 by Beethoven, an original work by Suguru Matsutani, which in the series is composed by Chiaki and arranged by Nodame, Mine, and Masumi.
4	"Lesson 4: Master Milch's Appearance"; Transliteration: "Lesson 4 Kyoshō Miruhi Tōjō" (Japanese: Lesson 4 巨匠ミルヒ登場)	Toshikazu Hashimoto	Masahiro Yokotani	February 1, 2007	July 12, 2010
A foreigner visits Chiaki's school and becomes friends with Nodame. Chiaki refuses to let him into his house because of his perverted behavior. It turns out the foreigner is Maestro Franz von Stresemann and is attending the school as head of the conducting department. Chiaki, interested in changing his major to conducting, gets rejected by the new professor who is apparently at odds with Chiaki's former "teacher", Vieira. Piece featured: Fantaisie-Impromptu by Chopin, and Mahler's Symphony No. 8, Symphony of a Thousand.
5	"Lesson 5: Chiaki the S Orchestra's Conductor"; Transliteration: "Lesson 5 Chiaki S Oke Shiki" (Japanese: Lesson 5 千秋Sオケ指揮)	Yōhei Suzuki	Tomoko Konparu	February 8, 2007	July 13, 2010
With Stresemann knocked out cold, Nodame "convinces" Chiaki to be substitute conductor for the special orchestra. Chiaki agrees and finds out that the group he's conducting is out of synch. As the rehearsal falls apart, Stresemann takes over and demonstrates everything that Chiaki failed to do. Stresemann finally accepts Chiaki as his student but tells him to remain a piano major. Piece featured: Symphony No. 7 by Beethoven.
6	"Lesson 6: Withdrawal"; Transliteration: "Lesson 6 Dattai" (Japanese: Lesson 6 脱退)	Daisuke Takashima	Tomoko Konparu	February 15, 2007	July 14, 2010
The S orchestra is to perform before the A orchestra at the upcoming concert. However, Stresemann takes "business" leave and Chiaki is forced to take his place conducting the S orchestra. In a twist of events, Stresemann quits the S orchestra and in revenge against Chiaki, plans to lead the A orchestra in humiliating the S orchestra at the concert. With the concert just a week away, Chiaki becomes the S orchestra's new conductor. Piece featured: Symphony No. 3 "Eroica" by Beethoven, Vocalise by Rachmaninoff
7	"Lesson 7: Chiaki and Kazuo"; Transliteration: "Lesson 7 Kazuo na Chiaki" (Japanese: Lesson 7 カズオな千秋)	Hiroaki Nishimura	Masahiro Yokotani	February 22, 2007	July 15, 2010
Chiaki is still having trouble getting the orchestra into shape, and everyone's confidence shatters under his harsh criticisms. With help from Nodame, Chiaki finally realizes Stresemann's reasoning behind the S Orchestra just in time for the concert subscription series, and the S Orchestra manages to impress their audience with an unorthodox display. Piece featured: Symphony No. 3 "Eroica" by Beethoven.
8	"Lesson 8: Milch's Repatriation"; Transliteration: "Lesson 8 Miruhī sōkan" (Japanese: Lesson 8 ミルヒー送還)	Yoshitaka Koyama	Miho Maruo	March 1, 2007	July 15, 2010
Chiaki is asked to leave the S orchestra to play the piano solo of Piano Concerto No. 2 by Sergei Rachmaninoff as requested by Stresseman for the A orchestra. It is revealed that Stresseman was asked by his ex-admired, a member of the academy's board of directors to instruct Chiaki in conducting. Pieces featured: Étude Op. 10, No. 4, an excerpt from Nocturne Op. 55, No. 1, both by Chopin, Piano Concerto No. 2 by Sergei Rachmaninoff, and Symphony No.1 in C Minor by Johannes Brahms.
9	"Lesson 9: Music Festival"; Transliteration: "Lesson 9 Ongakusai" (Japanese: Lesson 9 音楽祭)	Noriaki Akitaya	Masahiro Yokotani	March 8, 2007	July 16, 2010
Stresseman sends Chiaki, Nodame, Mine, and Masumi to a musical festival where each takes lessons from famous musicians in order to better their playing. An unprepared Mine is quickly overwhelmed by the many talented musicians there. Meanwhile, Chiaki is ordered to look out for Stresemann and thanks to Stresemann's hangover, is also made to conduct an orchestra and Nodame is yelled at by the festival director, Nina Lutz, for not having motivation. Pieces featured: Symphony No. 5 by Dvořák, Symphony No. 3 "Eroica" by Beethoven and Allegro barbaro by Bartók.
10	"Lesson 10: The Fact Charm"; Transliteration: "Lesson 10 Miseru toiu koto" (Japanese: Lesson 10 魅せるという事)	Toshikazu Hashimoto	Masahiro Yokotani	March 15, 2007	July 19, 2010
The school festival is here and the S Orchestra is to perform without the aid of Chiaki, who is busy practicing with the A Orchestra with their performance. Chiaki discovers what was missing from his playing courtesy of the S Orchestra, but Stresemann tells him to disregard it for their upcoming performance after insisting on it throughout all his practices. Pieces featured: Piano Concerto No. 2 by Rachmaninoff and Rhapsody in Blue by Gershwin (melodica version).
11	"Lesson 11: Piano"; Transliteration: "Lesson 11 Piano" (Japanese: Lesson 11 ピアノ)	Yōhei Suzuki	Tomoko Konparu	March 22, 2007	July 20, 2010
It is finally Stresemann, Chiaki, and the A Orchestra's turn to perform for the school's fall festival. They manage to captivate the audience with their Rachmaninoff performance. Chiaki and Stresemann go their separate ways as Stresemann returned to Europe the next day. Nodame becomes desperate to perform in an orchestra like Chiaki and is left with a message and present from Stresemann. Saiko, still thinking about Chiaki, comes by for a visit. Nodame also comes by after practicing Rachmaninoff for days without bathing and hardly any food. Piece featured: Piano Concerto No. 2 by Rachmaninoff.
12	"Lesson 12: Course"; Transliteration: "Lesson 12 Shinro" (Japanese: Lesson 12 進路)	Shigeru Ueda	Tomoko Konparu	April 12, 2007	July 21, 2010
Chiaki and Nodame perform Rachmaninoff on two pianos and cause quite a stir attracting an audience including Saiko and Etoh-sensei. Later Chiaki meets with the writers from Classic Life magazine and they try to investigate why Chiaki is still in Japan when he could be going abroad. Nodame goes around bringing candy to various 4th year students in the S Orchestra as they reflect on their experience playing under Chiaki, and on their future, as graduation looms around the corner. Piece featured: Piano Concerto No. 2 by Rachmaninoff (arranged for 2 pianos 4 hands).
13	"Lesson 13: Graduation"; Transliteration: "Lesson 13 Sotsugyō" (Japanese: Lesson 13 卒業)	Hideaki Uehara	Masahiro Yokotani	April 19, 2007	July 22, 2010
It's graduation time at the Momogaoka College of Music and its graduating students (including Chiaki and Masumi) put on a performance of various classical pieces for their graduation recital. Kiyora Miki, the former concert mistress of the Nina Lutz Seminar Youth Orchestra, proposes to Chiaki her idea of assembling an orchestra. She invites Chiaki in as their conductor. Needless to say, she also requests that Chiaki and his "superstar" status to invite some of the elite musicians (cellist, violinist, and oboist) into the orchestra. The S Orchestra has their final get together as they disband and move on. Piece featured: Syrinx by Claude Debussy, Concerto for Percussion by André Jolivet, and Mephisto Waltz No. 1 (Der Tanz in der Dorfschenke) by Liszt.
14	"Lesson 14: Past"; Transliteration: "Lesson 14 Kako" (Japanese: Lesson 14 過去)	Daisuke Takashima	Michihiro Tsuchiya	April 26, 2007	July 23, 2010
Under rather bizarre circumstances, Nodame makes a visit to the home in which Chiaki grew up, meets his family, and even makes dinner for them (onigiri and nabe). Since the passing of Chiaki's grandfather, tensions seem to have risen within the family, nearly to a breaking point. The pair end up staying overnight, and when a nightmare wakes Chiaki, he retreats to his grandfather's audio room. Upon waking to the sound of the opera, Nodame finds Chiaki in the study, listening to records. Eager to play, she convinces him to accompany her on the violin while she plays the piano (by ear). Piece featured: St Matthew Passion by Bach.
15	"Lesson 15: Change"; Transliteration: "Lesson 15 Henka" (Japanese: Lesson 15 変化)	Toshikazu Hashimoto	Tomoko Konparu	May 3, 2007	July 27, 2010
Chiaki's relatives are awaken by Chiaki and Nodame's playing. Both uncle and cousin agree that Chiaki should continue his music studies. Just before leaving Chiaki and his relatives all agree that Nodame should become a concert pianist and not a kindergarten teacher (seeing as she will be bullied). Nodame is perturbed and decides to go home by herself (as opposed to riding a taxi with Chiaki). Later, back in school, Chiaki meets up with Kiyora Miki (violin), Yasunori Kuroki (oboe), and Toru Kikuchi (cello) to discuss the new orchestra they were about to "build". Meanwhile, Nodame has been officially transferred to Etoh-sensei (famous for his white fan for hitting people with). Later that night, Chiaki goes to a drinking party of the new orchestra deciding the piece of their first performance. Mine's father called and said that Nodame dropped by to look for Chiaki but did not eat anything. Piece featured: Violin Sonata in E minor, Op. 82 by Elgar.
16	"Lesson 16: Start-Up"; Transliteration: "Lesson 16 Shidō" (Japanese: Lesson 16 始動)	Noriaki Akitaya; Shigeru Ueda	Masahiro Yokotani	May 10, 2007	July 28, 2010
The Rising Star Orchestra (R☆S Orchestra) starts rehearsing for their first concert, while Nodame and Etoh-sensei finally come to an agreement after days of chasing and persuasion. Piece featured: Oboe Concerto by Mozart.
17	"Lesson 17: Waste"; Transliteration: "Lesson 17 Muda" (Japanese: Lesson 17 無駄)	Yōhei Suzuki	Masahiro Yokotani	May 17, 2007	July 29, 2010
Nodame finishes her last "Moja Moja" song and now must do her part in her deal with Etoh-sensei. Meanwhile, some members of the R☆S Orchestra take a break on rehearsals to dedicate to their solo competitions, especially Kiyora, Kuroki and Kikuchi. Piece featured: Allegro non troppo from Symphonie Espagnole by Lalo.
18	"Lesson 18: Arousal"; Transliteration: "Lesson 18 Kakusei" (Japanese: Lesson 18 覚醒)	Daisuke Takashima	Michihiro Tsuchiya	May 24, 2007	July 30, 2010
Finally the time comes for the R☆S Orchestra's first concert.
19	"Lesson 19: Flight"; Transliteration: "Lesson 19 Hishō" (Japanese: Lesson 19 飛翔)	Shigeru Ueda	Tomoko Konparu	May 31, 2007	August 2, 2010
After the concert, Nodame uses hypnotism to cure Chiaki's fear of flying. Pieces featured: Symphony No. 1 by Brahms, Piano Sonata in A minor, D. 845 by Schubert, and Transcendental Etude No. 5 "Feux Follets" by Liszt.
20	"Lesson 20: World"; Transliteration: "Lesson 20 Sekai" (Japanese: Lesson 20 世界)	Toshikazu Hashimoto	Michihiro Tsuchiya	June 7, 2007	August 3, 2010
Nodame advances through the preliminaries of the Maradona piano competition, while the R☆S Orcherstra's fame increases, drawing more and more attention. Pieces featured: Piano Sonata in A minor, D. 845 by Schubert, Cello Concerto No. 1 in A minor, Op. 33 by Saint-Saëns,The Well-Tempered Clavier Book 2, Fugue No. 16, BWV 885 by Bach, Etude Op. 10, No. 4 by Chopin, Transcendental Etude No. 5 "Feux Follets" by Liszt, and L'Isle Joyeuse by Debussy.
21	"Lesson 21: Accident"; Transliteration: "Lesson 21 Ihen" (Japanese: Lesson 21 異変)	Katsushi Sakurabi	Masahiro Yokotani	June 14, 2007	August 4, 2010
Nodame makes it to the final round, but an untimely fever from practicing too much sets her back as it now becomes a race against time to finish memorizing the pieces for the final round. Just when the pressure couldn't have been any heavier, she runs into a colleague from her childhood, Yuuto Segawa, a student at Nodame's first-attended piano class, Hanazakura, which in turn brings back her bad memories she had repressed. Chiaki, on the other hand, has his hands full with the new violinist, but attends the Maradona finals to observe Nodame and the other contestants. The episode ends with a cliffhanger, as Nodame suffers a memory slip and grinds to a halt in the middle of her final piece. Pieces featured: Variations on a Theme of Paganini by Johannes Brahms, Gaspard de la nuit by Joseph-Maurice Ravel, Piano Sonata No. 23 Op. 57 by Ludwig van Beethoven, Piano Sonata No. 14 by Ludwig van Beethoven, Piano Sonata No. 8 K.310 by Wolfgang Amadeus Mozart, Scherzo No. 4 in E major by Frédéric Chopin, Sonata No. 2 in G minor by Robert Schumann and Petrushka by Igor Fyodorovich Stravinsky.
22	"Lesson 22: Last"; Transliteration: "Lesson 22 Saigo" (Japanese: Lesson 22 最後)	Yōhei Suzuki	Tomoko Konparu	June 21, 2007	August 5, 2010
Nodame half-improvises her way through the rest of the piece. She gets generous applause, but everybody knows that she has no chance of getting any prize. Chiaki tries to cheer her up by asking her to come to Europe with him. Nodame, still depressed by her performance, shows no interest. The New Year's concert is around the corner and Chiaki has yet to inform the Rising-Star Orchestra of his pending departure from Japan as well as his replacement conductor, Matsuda. Sakuma also shares his reasons as to why he had helped Chiaki throughout his past 2 years starting from his Rachmaninoff performance. Pieces featured: Petrushka by Igor Fyodorovich Stravinsky, Prélude à l'après-midi d'un faune by Claude Debussy, Carmen Fantasy by Pablo de Sarasate, and Till Eulenspiegels lustige Streiche Op.28 by Richard Strauss.
23	"Lesson 23: Future"; Transliteration: "Lesson 23 Mirai" (Japanese: Lesson 23 未来)	Noriaki Akitaya	Tomoko Konparu	June 28, 2007	August 6, 2010
Chiaki conducts his last piece with the Rising Star Orchestra and contemplates how he even got there in the first place. With Nodame still away in Okawa, Chiaki is urged to persuade her to return to piano by visiting her home town after the concert. Chiaki and Nodame share an intimate moment at the riverbed as her father catches sight of them from his boat. Chiaki and Nodame will be looking forward to seeing each other in Europe. Pieces featured: Symphony No. 7, Op. 92 by Ludwig van Beethoven and Piano Sonata D845 by Franz Schubert.
24 (8.5)	"Lesson Quaver Rest: Nodame and Chiaki's Ocean Story"; Transliteration: "Lesson Nodame to Chiaki no umi monogatari" (Japanese: Lesson のだめと千秋の海物語)	Kōichi Takada	Tomoko Konparu	February 16, 2008	July 26, 2010
A 15-minute special that takes place before the main events of episode 9. Even though it's their summer vacation, Stresemann decides to send Chiaki, Nodame, Mine, and Masumi to a music festival. The OVA details a detour to the beach before arriving at the festival.

=== Nodame Cantabile: Paris ===
No.	Title	Directed by	Written by	Original release date
1	"Lesson 1"; Transliteration: "Leçon 1"	Chiaki Kon	Yōji Enokido	October 9, 2008
Chiaki and Nodame arrive at Paris to hone their musical skills. While he who had lived in France before easily adapts himself to their new environment, she must face some difficulties herself, including having to learn the country's language. Piece featured: Miroirs - Alborado del Gracioso by Maurice Ravel, Piano Concerto No. 1 in D minor BWV1052 by Johann Sebastian Bach.
2	"Lesson 2: Chiaki Goes to the Conducting Competition"; Transliteration: "Leçon 2 Chiaki Shiki Konkūru e" (Japanese: Leçon 2 千秋 指揮コンクールへ)	Chiaki Kon	Yōji Enokido	October 16, 2008
Chiaki takes part in his first competition as a conductor. But he ends up having to face strong contestants like Jean Donnadieu, one of Sebastiano Vieira's apprentices. Piece featured: Haydn - Symphony No. 104 (Haydn), Rossini - William Tell Overture, Richard Strauss - Till Eulenspiegel's Merry Pranks, Russlan and Ludmila Mikhail Glinka, Tchaikovsky - Violin Concerto in D Major, Op.35
3	"Lesson 3: Stresemann Reunion"; Transliteration: "Leçon 3 Shutorēzeman Saikai" (Japanese: Leçon 3 シュトレーゼマン再会)	Tomoaki Ōta	Yōji Enokido	October 23, 2008
Nodame and Chiaki meet Stresseman in Paris. Chiaki starts to travel the world attending concerts with Stresseman after being forced to sign a contract with his manager, while Nodame has her first lesson with an acquaintance of hers at the conservatoire. Piece featured: Chopin - Nocturne Op. 27 No. 2, Liszt - Transcendental Etude No. 4 - Mazeppa
4	"Lesson 4: Nodame is Exhausted, Chiaki is Rejected"; Transliteration: "Leçon 4 Nodame shōsui Chiaki o kyozetsu" (Japanese: Leçon 4 のだめ憔悴 千秋を拒絶)	Nanako Shimazaki	Yōji Enokido	October 30, 2008
Chiaki rehearses for his debut concert in Paris, and finds that Nodame is troubled as she is not doing fine at the conservatoire. While he tries to cheer her up, their relationship ends up moving a little forward. Piece featured: Liszt - Transcendental Etude No. 4 - Mazeppa, Maurice Ravel - Ma Mère l'Oye IV. Les entretiens de la belle et de la bête, Piano Sonata in A minor, D. 845 by Schubert, "Adagio cantabile" from Piano Sonata No. 8 by Beethoven
5	"Lesson 5: Chiaki and Nodame Cross Paths"; Transliteration: "Leçon 5 Chiaki to Nodame surechigai" (Japanese: Leçon 5 千秋とのだめすれ違い)	Yūji Yamaguchi	Yōji Enokido	November 6, 2008
Kuroki is having trouble to adapt himself to life at Paris until he meets Nodame at the conservatoire. Meanwhile, Chiaki is feeling insecure as Nodame does not answer his phone calls and wonders if both will really be able to spend Christmas together. Piece featured: Prelude and Fugue in F sharp minor, BWV 883, Prelude & Fugue in C major, BWV 870 both by Bach
6	"Lesson 6: Chiaki Becomes a Regular Conductor"; Transliteration: "Leçon 6 Chiaki jōnin shikisha ni shūnin" (Japanese: Leçon 6 千秋常任指揮者に就任)	Daisuke Takashima	Yōji Enokido	November 13, 2008
Chiaki is appointed as the official conductor of a famous orchestra which is facing serious difficulties, and Rui Son, a famous pianist who is an old friend of his, gives a break on her performances to study at the conservatoire. However, Rui's closeness to Chiaki is more than enough to ignite Nodame's jealousy. Piece featured: Capriccio Espagnol by Rimsky-Korsakov
7	"Lesson 7: Chiaki and Nodame Play Together?!"; Transliteration: "Leçon 7 Chiaki to Nodame hatsu-kyōen!?" (Japanese: Leçon 7 千秋とのだめ初共演!?)	Shigeru Ueda	Yōji Enokido	November 20, 2008
The Marlet Orchestra is short on staff, and Chiaki asks Nodame to take a part on it. However, Nodame's dreams of having her first performance along Chiaki are crushed when Rui is forced to assume her place due to a misunderstanding. Piece featured: Boléro by Maurice Ravel
8	"Lesson 8: Chiaki and Nodame Make a Fresh Start"; Transliteration: "Leçon 8 Chiaki to Nodame no saishuppatsu" (Japanese: Leçon 8 千秋とのだめの再出発)	Miho Maruo	Yōji Enokido	November 27, 2008
Disappointed with his first performance, Chiaki starts scouting for new musicians and invites Kuroki for an audition. Meanwhile, Rui is forced by her mother, Mrs. Son, to leave Paris with her, after she heard from Madame Bellou (possibly Rui's landlady) that she's been slacking off and spending time at Chiaki's. While Nodame rehearses for the exams at the conservatoire along with Kuroki and Paul duBois. Piece featured: The Sorcerer's Apprentice by Paul Dukas, "Adagio cantabile" from Piano Sonata No. 8 by Beethoven, Piano Sonata, K. 331 3rd mvt. (rondo alla turka) - by Wolfgang Amadeus Mozart
9	"Lesson 9: Nodame's First Recital!"; Transliteration: "Leçon 9 Nodame Hatsu-risaitaru!" (Japanese: Leçon 9 のだめ初リサイタル!)	Nanako Shimazaki	Yōji Enokido	December 4, 2008
Nodame travels to Saint-Malo with Chiaki, Tanya and Kuroki for her very first recital. However, her companions are worried about her insecurity, as she usually has trouble in playing pieces by Mozart. Piece featured: Sonata in D Major, K576 - by Wolfgang Amadeus Mozart, Jeux d'eau by Ravel
10	"Lesson 10: Twinkle, Twinkle, Little Star Recital"; Transliteration: "Leçon 10 Risaitaru Kirakiraboshi" (Japanese: Leçon 10 リサイタルキラキラ星)	Chiaki Kon	Yōji Enokido	December 11, 2008
Nodame's first recital becomes a huge success, to the point of her receiving other proposals for job. Piece featured: Variations on "Ah vous dirai-je, Maman", Piano Sonata No. 18, Eine kleine Nachtmusik, Piano Sonata No. 8 - by Wolfgang Amadeus Mozart, Legende No. 2 - by Franz Liszt, Jeux d'eau - by Maurice Ravel, Piano Sonata in A minor, D. 845 - by Franz Schubert
11	"Lesson 11: Final Chapter - Chiaki's Magic"; Transliteration: "Leçon 11 Saishūshō Chiaki no mahō" (Japanese: Leçon 11 最終章・千秋の魔法)	Yōhei Suzuki	Yōji Enokido	December 18, 2008
Auditions are held for the Marlet Orchestra, with Paul and Kuroki being among the new members. After intense rehearsal, the Orchestra has another concert, and the time comes for Chiaki to show the results of his and his musicians' efforts so far. Piece featured: Rossini - William Tell Overture, Carl Nielsen - Allegro (4th movement) of Symphony No. 4 "The Inextinguishable"
OVA	"I got M・fil."; Transliteration: "M-firu itadaichaimashita." (Japanese: Mフィルいただいちゃいました。)	Yōhei Suzuki	Masahiro Yokotani	August 10, 2009
A 22-minute special centering around the life of Yukihisa Matsuda in Paris with his jealousy of Chiaki who is now a successful conductor also working in Paris. Piece featured: Tannhäuser - by Richard Wagner

=== Nodame Cantabile: Finale ===
No.	Title	Directed by	Written by	Original release date
1	"Lesson 1"; Transliteration: "Leçon 1"	Masahiro Yokotani	Hikaru Satō	January 14, 2010
Chiaki's popularity as head of the Marlet Orchestra keeps increasing while Nodame gets depressed as she feels the distance between them growing and she decides to enter in a competition by herself, even without her teacher Auclair's approval. Pieces featured: Bach's Concert No. 1 in D minor, Romeo and Juliet's Overture-Fantasy by Tchaikovsky, Minute Waltz, Études Op. 10 No. 8 and Op.10 No. 12 by Chopin
2	"Lesson 2"; Transliteration: "Leçon 2"	Yōhei Suzuki	Hiroshi Ōnogi	January 21, 2010
Chiaki decides to move to another apartment much to Nodame's despair and Rui tries her best to convince Auclair to have lessons with her, but he seems to be more much more interested in teaching Nodame instead. After hearing Nodame's smooth playing, she also starts to doubt herself. Pieces featured: La Mandragore by Tristan Murail, Sonata K159 in C Major by Scarlatti, Nocturne Op. 9 No. 2 in E♭ Major by Chopin, Transcendental Étude No. 10 by Liszt
3	"Lesson 3"; Transliteration: "Leçon 3"	Chiaki Kon	Reiko Yoshida	January 28, 2010
Thanks to Chiaki's encouragement, Rui decides to keep playing and a special concert featuring both is arranged. Stresseman is seriously depressed over the death of a friend of his and Chiaki, on the way to attend one of Nodame's recitals, has a surprising reunion with Sebastiano Vieira and decides to accompany him instead.(Rui play, after being back home, a piece of Mozart but I don't know which one => Piano Sonata K311 3rd Mvt by Mozart Rondo Theme C) Pieces featured: Italian Concerto, BWV 971 by Bach, Op. 19 No. 1 "Sweet Remembrance" from Songs without Words by Felix Mendelssohn, Rondo: Allegro from Piano Sonata #9, K311 by Wolfgang Amadeus Mozart, Polonaise Fantasie by Frédéric Chopin, Légende No. 1: St François d'Assise by Franz Liszt
4	"Lesson 4"; Transliteration: "Leçon 4"	Sadanori Kaneda	Miho Maruo	February 4, 2010
Tanya starts to feel jealousy when Kuroki is asked to take care of a young Japanese girl who is trying to enter the conservatoire. While trying to get closer to him, she starts to wonder about her own future as she is nearing graduation. Pieces featured: The Well-Tempered Clavier Book I, No. 22 (Prelude) in B-flat minor by Bach; Miroirs No 3 "Une Barque sur l'Océan" by Ravel, Polonaise in A-flat major, Op. 53 by Chopin
5	"Lesson 5"; Transliteration: "Leçon 5"	Noriaki Akitaya	Masahiro Yokotani	February 11, 2010
Tanya and Yu Long have poor performances at the competitions in which they took part, and thus will be forced to return to their respective countries after graduation. While trying to cheer Tanya up, Kuroki ends up making a surprising proposal. Meanwhile, Nodame hears a piece of music that draws her attention. She hopes to play it along Chiaki someday, unaware that it's the same piece that will be featured at Chiaki and Rui's concert. Pieces featured: The Well-Tempered Clavier Book I, No. 22 (Prelude) in B-flat minor and Book 2 No.4 (Fugue) in C-sharp minor by Bach; Kreisleriana (Op. 16) by Schumann; Piano Concerto in G major, Mov. 1, by Ravel; Piano Concerto No.2 by Rachmaninov; Rhapsodie espagnole by Liszt
6	"Lesson 6"; Transliteration: "Leçon 6"	Tomoaki Ōta	Hiroshi Ōnogi	February 18, 2010
Nodame finds that Chiaki has hidden from her the connection between the piece and his concert with Rui, and she can't hide from him her dissatisfaction for not telling her sooner. After looking at how many difficult pieces Nodame is studying with her teacher, Chiaki cancels an important trip to Italy just to lend her a hand. Pieces featured: Piano Concerto in G major by Ravel, Piano Sonata No. 3 in B minor by Chopin, Fantaisie in F minor by Chopin, Piano Sonata No. 31 by Beethoven, Images by Debussy
7	"Lesson 7"; Transliteration: "Leçon 7"	Yōhei Suzuki	Reiko Yoshida	February 25, 2010
Chiaki helps Rui for their concerto. When Nodame found out, she feels betrayed, and uses that feeling to help her master a piece. Pieces featured: Paris Symphony by Mozart, Third Movement of Piano Sonata No. 31 by Beethoven, Piano Concerto in G major by Ravel, I Got Rhythm by George Gershwin, Images by Debussy
8	"Lesson 8"; Transliteration: "Leçon 8"	Chiaki Kon	Miho Maruo	March 4, 2010
After Chiaki and Rui's concerto, Nodame and Chiaki spend the night together and she proposes to him in the following morning, just to be rejected by him. However, Chiaki starts to wonder about how serious she was at that time, and Stresseman pays a visit to her. Pieces featured: Piano Concerto in G major by Maurice Ravel, Third Movement of Piano Sonata No. 31 by Beethoven
9	"Lesson 9"; Transliteration: "Leçon 9"	Yōhei Suzuki	Reiko Yoshida	March 11, 2010
Nodame has been absent from school and Chiaki starts looking desperately for her, just to find that she was rehearsing for a concerto with Stresseman in London. Pieces featured: Piano Concerto No. 1 in E minor, Op. 11 by Chopin
10	"Lesson 10"; Transliteration: "Leçon 10"	Hikaru Satō	Masahiro Yokotani	March 18, 2010
Nodame's concerto with Stresseman becomes a huge success worldwide. However, she loses the will to keep playing and disappears for a while. Meanwhile, Chiaki finally comes at terms with his feelings for her.
11	"The Final Lesson"; Transliteration: "La Dernière Leçon"	Chiaki Kon	Masahiro Yokotani	March 25, 2010
Back in Paris, Nodame spends her days quietly playing for children while her friends wonder if she will ever resume her studies or her career. Determined to put Nodame back on track, Chiaki asks her to play with him-- the same piece they played together when they first met. This episode also tells us what has happened to some of the characters they met in Paris. Piece Featured: Kinderszenen (Op. 15) by Schumann, 1st Movement of Piano Sonata No. 31 by Beethoven, Variations on "Ah vous dirai-je, Maman", Piano Sonata No. 18 and Sonata for Two Pianos in D major both by Mozart, Capriccio Espagnol by Rimsky-Korsakov
OVA	"Lesson Semiquaver: Mine and Kiyora's Reunion"; Transliteration: "Leçon Mine to Kiyora no saikai" (Japanese: Leçon 峰と清良の再会)	Hikaru Satō	Masahiro Yokotani	April 7, 2010
DVD special episode taking place before Episode 1 of Finale that focuses on Miki Kiyora making it to the final round of a competition in Paris. Piece featured: Six Sonata for Solo Violin No. 5 in G Major by Eugène Ysaÿe, Scherzo No. 4 in E major by Frédéric Chopin, Rossini - William Tell Overture, Violin Sonata No. 1 in D minor by Camille Saint-Saens, Violin Concerto "To the Memory of an Angel" by Alban Berg
OVA	"N/A"	Chiaki Kon	Masahiro Yokotani	April 26, 2010
A 10 minutes special set after the events of Nodame Cantabile: Finale. Chiaki and Nodame fight over the meal Chiaki prepared. As a result of the argument, Nodame accepts a date with Lucas but Chiaki also has other plans.
