= Transcendence =

Transcendence, transcendent, or transcendental may refer to:

== Mathematics ==
- Transcendental number, a number that is not the root of any polynomial with rational coefficients
- Algebraic element or transcendental element, an element of a field extension that is not the root of any polynomial with coefficients from the base field
- Transcendental function, a function which does not satisfy a polynomial equation whose coefficients are themselves polynomials
- Transcendental number theory, the branch of mathematics dealing with transcendental numbers and algebraic independence

== Music ==
- Transcendence (Adil Omar album), a 2018 hip hop album
- Transcendence (Alice Coltrane album), a 1977 jazz album
- Transcendence (Crimson Glory album), a 1988 heavy metal album
- Transcendence (Devin Townsend Project album), a 2016 heavy metal album
- "Transcendence" (Lindsey Stirling instrumental), a 2012 instrumental piece
- Transcendental (album), a 2006 progressive metal album by To-Mera
- "Transcendence (Segue)", a 2000 progressive metal instrumental piece by Symphony X from the album V - The New Mythology Suite
- "Transcendence", a 2008 thrash/melodic death metal track by Sylosis from the album Conclusion of an Age
- "Transcendence", a 2025 progressive metalcore track by Born of Osiris from the album Through Shadows

== Literature ==
- Transcendence (Rosenthal book), a 2011 book by Norman E. Rosenthal
- Transcendence (Salvatore novel), a 2002 fantasy novel by R. A. Salvatore
- Transcendence (Sheffield novel), a 1992 science-fiction novel by Charles Sheffield
- Transcendence: How Humans Evolved Through Fire, Language, Beauty, and Time, a 2019 book by Gaia Vince
- Transcendence: My Spiritual Experiences with Pramukh Swamiji, a 2015 book by A. P. J. Abdul Kalam and Arun Tiwari
- Transcendent (novel), a 2005 science-fiction novel by Stephen Baxter

== Philosophy ==
- Transcendence (philosophy), climbing or going beyond some philosophical concept or limit
- Transcendentalism, a 19th-century American religious and philosophical movement that advocates that there is an ideal spiritual state that transcends the physical and empirical
- Transcendent theosophy, a school of Islamic philosophy founded by the 17th-century Persian philosopher Mulla Sadra
- Transcendental idealism, a doctrine founded by 18th-century German philosopher Immanuel Kant
- Transcendental realism, a concept put forward by Roy Bhaskar
- Transcendental arguments, a style of philosophical argumentation
- Transcendental phenomenology, a field of phenomenological inquiry developed by Edmund Husserl
- Transcendentals, religious and philosophical properties of being

== Religion ==
- Transcendence (religion), the aspect of a god wholly independent of the material universe
- Transcendental Meditation, a meditation technique introduced by Maharishi Mahesh Yogi
- Transcendentals, religious and philosophical properties of being

== Other ==
- Transcendence (sculpture) a 2008 stainless steel sulture by Melvin Edwards
- Transcendence (2012 film), a Chinese film
- Transcendence (2014 film), an American film starring Johnny Depp and Morgan Freeman
- Transcendence (band), an American alternative rock band
- Transcendence (Jellum), an outdoor sculpture by Keith Jellum, in Portland, Oregon, US
- Transcendent (TV series), a 2016 American reality television series
- Transcendence (video game), a 1995 science-fiction game by George Moromisato

== See also ==
- Transcend (disambiguation)
- Transcendental Étude (disambiguation), any of a number of compositions with this title
- Transcendental whistling, a Daoist technique of long-drawn whistling that functioned as a yogic breath exercise
