= Sergio Prezioso =

Italian pianist, media composer, and teacher

Sergio Prezioso is an Italian pianist, educator and media composer.

== Biography ==
=== Musical education ===
Born in Italy, Prezioso was introduced to music with piano studies at age 5. In the early years he began to perform in public as a soloist, participating in and winning numerous national and international competitions, such as the International Piano Competition "Monopoli". At the age of 18 he was accepted as a student by Lucia Passaglia, pupil of Alfred Cortot and Arturo Benedetti Michelangeli.

He studied at the Conservatory of Music “Gaetano Braga”, graduating with highest marks and honours in 2000. In the same year he recorded the Bach-Busoni Chaconne for the Italian series Best Piano Graduates.

In 2006, he graduated in Jazz at the Conservatory of Music “Alfredo Casella” of L’Aquila, Italy, and after winning a scholarship to attend Berklee College of Music in Boston, he moved to the United States and graduated Summa Cum Laude at Berklee in 2012, majoring in Contemporary Writing and Production with a minor in Music for TV & New Media.

=== Career ===
After having been a touring musician for national and international artists, in 2012 he moved to New York City where he worked as a media composer, writing music for TV advertising campaigns.

He wrote the music for a variety of multimedia projects as well as the scores for major TV commercials, including Johnson & Johnson, Mitsubishi, Geico, Comcast and Academy Sports + Outdoors among others.

As a sound engineer, he has mixed and mastered numerous projects, including the award winning documentaries Naleena, and HeartWood.
