= Transcend =

Transcend may refer to:

- Transcend (album) (2004), an album by Canadian singer-songwriter Carole Pope
- Transcend Information, a Taiwanese electronics manufacturer
- Transcend Music, a British record label
- Transcend: Nine Steps to Living Well Forever (2009), a book by Ray Kurzweil
- Transcend (horse), a Japanese Thoroughbred racehorse

== See also ==
- Transcendence (disambiguation)
- Transcender
