= Fantasia and Fugue in C minor, BWV 906 =

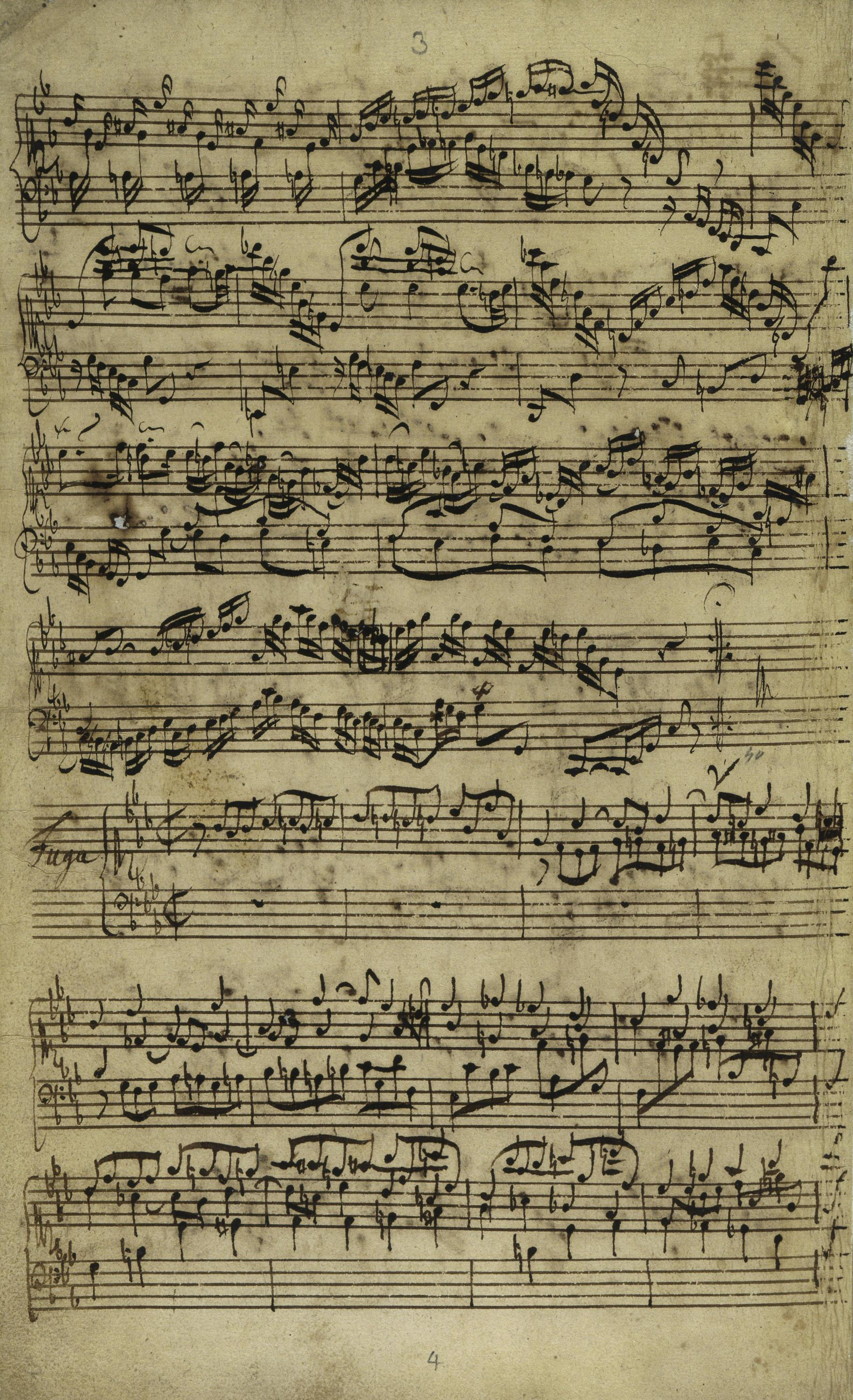
Bach's second autograph of the Fantasia and Fugue in C minor, BWV 906: p. 3, showing the end of the Fantasia and the start of the Fugue.

Fantasia in C minor, BWV 906
Performed on a Flemish harpsichord by Martha Goldstein

Fantasia and Fugue in C minor, BWV 906, is a keyboard piece, likely unfinished, composed by Johann Sebastian Bach sometime during his tenure in Leipzig (1723–1750). The work survives in two autograph scores, one with the fantasia alone, and the other, believed to have been penned around 1738 in which the fugue is incomplete. The piece is notable for being one of Bach's latest compositions in the prelude and fugue format, and for being a showcase of Bach trying his hand at the emerging galant and empfindsam styles of music that his sons were known to compose.

== History ==
Based on the watermarks of the paper on which the oldest extant autograph of the Fantasia was written, its likely date of origin is around 1728–1730. The handwriting is neat, almost without corrections. Based on similar research, the date of the second extant autograph (including the Fugue) is around 1738. The handwriting of this manuscript is a fair copy and nearly without corrections, until, from the 25th bar of the Fugue, it becomes more sketchy. According to Hans-Joachim Schulze, the origin of this manuscript may be connected to Bach's 1738 extended visit to Dresden.

== Movements ==
=== Fantasia ===
The Fantasia is cast in a three-part sonata form, and is characterized by hand-crossing figures and running triplets. Like the BWV 542 and 903 Fantasias, this movement is a highly chromatic affair.

=== Fugue ===
The fugue is unfinished, abruptly stopping 47-measures into the movement. Because the work exists in a fair-copy autograph, it is possible that Bach had completed the work in an earlier draft. Like the preceding movement, the fugue is highly chromatic, and contains hand-crossing figures, the most of any Bach fugue.

== Reception ==
In 1802 Johann Nikolaus Forkel described two keyboard fantasies by Bach in his biography of the composer. He sees the first of these, the one known as chromatic (BWV 903), as "unique and unequalled", and the second, the one in C minor (BWV 906), as a work of different character, "rather the Allegro of a Sonata". Unaware of the composition's second autograph, which was only discovered in Dresden in 1876, he thinks that the Fugue is unconnected to the Fantasia and that the end of the Fugue is likely by another composer. According to Charles Sanford Terry "... the Fugue cannot be called unfinished."

Ferruccio Busoni used the fantasia and his own completion of the fugue in his Fantasia, Adagio e Fuga, BV B 37.

== Works cited ==
- Forkel, Johann Nikolaus; Terry, Charles Sanford (1920). Johann Sebastian Bach: His Life, Art and Work – translated from the German, with notes and appendices. New York: Harcourt, Brace and Howe.
- Schulenberg, David (2006), The Keyboard Music of J.S. Bach (2nd ed.), Routledge, ISBN 0-521-89115-9
