= Études (disambiguation) =

Études (French for "studies") or Étude may refer to:

== Compositions ==
- Études (Chopin), by Frédéric Chopin, 1829–1839
- Études (Debussy), by Claude Debussy, 1915
- Études (Ligeti), by György Ligeti, 1985–2001
- Études (Rautavaara), by Einojuhani Rautavaara, 1969
- Études (ballet), by Harald Lander, 1948
- "Étude" (instrumental), by Mike Oldfield, 1984
- "Etude", a song by Empire of the Sun from Walking on a Dream, 2008

== Albums ==
- Etudes (Charlie Haden album), 1988
- Etudes (Ron Carter album), 1983

== Periodicals ==
- Études (journal), a Roman Catholic journal published by the Jesuits
- The Etude, an American music magazine 1883–1957

== See also ==
- List of étude composers
