= Vesselin Stanev =

Bulgarian pianist

Vesselin Stanev (Bulgarian: Веселин Станев) is a Bulgarian pianist.

== Biography ==
Stanev was born in Varna in 1964. Initially he studied at the National Academy of Music in Sofia, after that at the Moscow Conservatory, and finally at the Conservatoire de Paris.

He is noted for being one of the few pianists to have a recording of the complete cycle of Liszt's Transcendental Etudes.

He has given performances at Wigmore Hall, Alte Oper, Gewandhaus, Salle Gaveau and KlangBogen Wien, among others. Stanev has performed in many European countries, Russia and Japan.

Stanev has been praised for his brilliant playing style and ability to express the nature of Romantic musical works. He has been labeled by Pravda Online "a modest genius".

Currently he resides in Switzerland.

== Discography ==
- Franz Liszt – Réminiscences de Norma, Dante Sonata, Mephisto Waltz No. 1, Réminiscences de Don Juan (RCA Red Seal, 2014).
- Undine: Music for Flute and Piano – Works by Haydn, W. A. Mozart, F. X. Mozart, Mendelssohn, Schubert, Bizet, Reinicke, Schumann, Donizetti (with Eva Oertle, flute; Sony Classical, 2013)
- Franz Liszt – Etudes d'exécution transcendante S 139 (1851) (RCA Red Seal), 2010)
- Alexander Scriabin – Preludes op. 11 / Sonatas (Sony Classical, 2006)
- Frédéric Chopin – 12 Etudes op. 10 / 12 Etudes op. 25 (Gega New, 2003)
- Ludwig van Beethoven / Robert Schumann – Fifteen Variations and Fugue in E flat major, Op.35, “Eroica Variations” / Kreisleriana, Op.16 (Gega New, 2002)
- Robert Schumann / Franz Liszt – Fantasie in C major, Op. 17 / Sonata in B minor, S178 (Gega New, 2001)
- Frédéric Chopin / Maurice Ravel / Sergey Rachmaninov – 24 Preludes, op. 28 / Gaspard de la nuit / Sonata No.2, op. 36 (Gega New, 2000)
- Frédéric Chopin / Sergey Rachmaninov / Franz Liszt – Ballades; Scherzo, Polonaise, Barcarolle op. 23, 52, 39, 44, 60 / Moments Musicaux, op. 16 / Hungarian Rhapsodies, S244, Nos. 11 & 12 (Gega New, 1997)
