= Bach-Busoni Editions =

Series of publications by Ferruccio Busoni

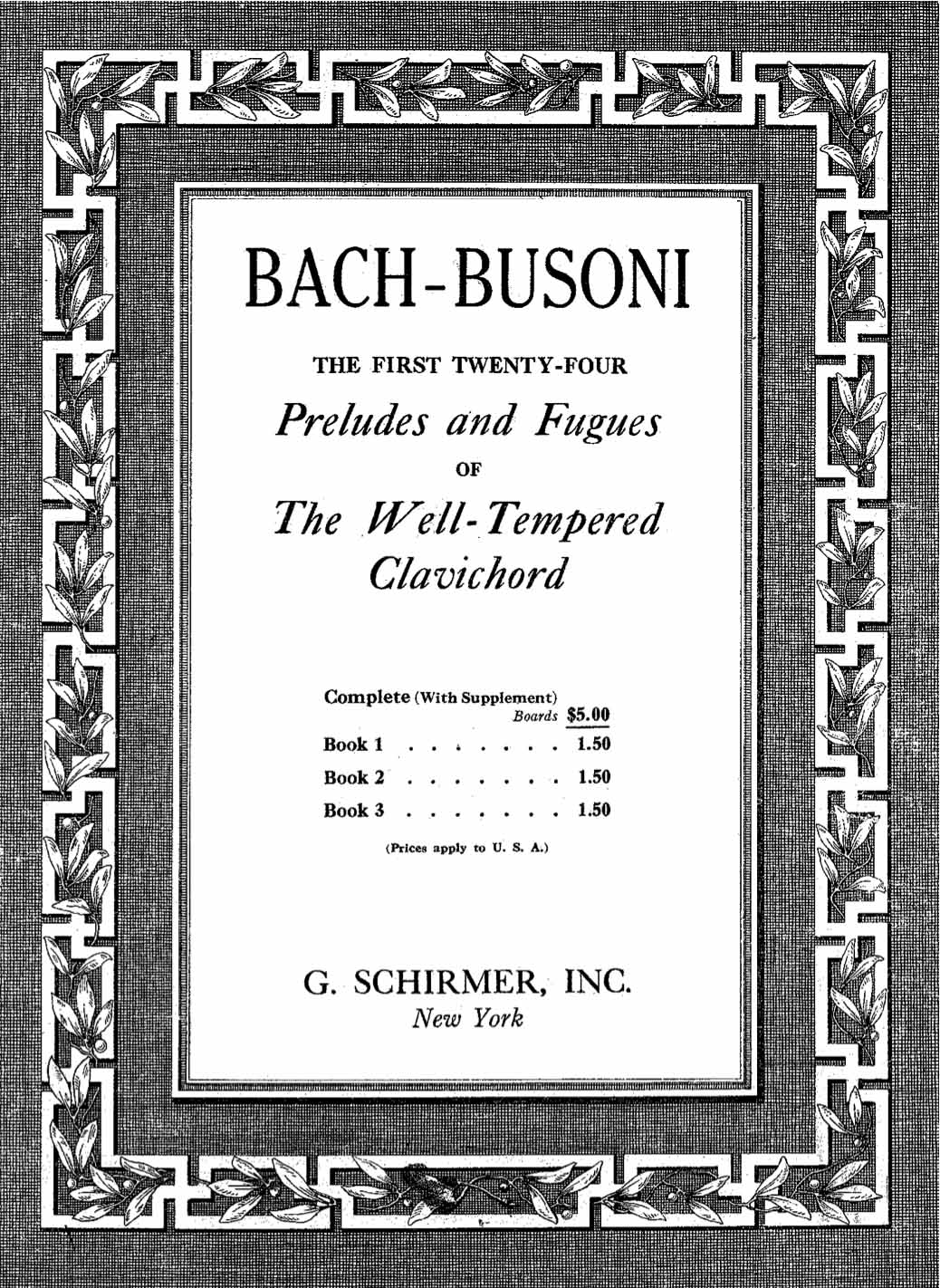
Cover of Busoni's 1894 edition of Bach's Well-Tempered Clavier.

The Bach-Busoni Editions are a series of publications by the Italian pianist-composer Ferruccio Busoni (1866–1924) containing primarily piano transcriptions of keyboard music by Johann Sebastian Bach. They also include performance suggestions, practice exercises, musical analysis, an essay on the art of transcribing Bach's organ music for piano, an analysis of the fugue from Beethoven's 'Hammerklavier' sonata, and other related material. The later editions also include free adaptations and original compositions by Busoni which are based on the music of Bach.

Busoni issued his Bach editions over a nearly 30-year span in two collections: the 25-volume Busoni Ausgabe (Joh. Seb. Bach Klavierwerke) and the Bach-Busoni Collected Edition (Bach-Busoni Gesammelte Ausgabe), which was first issued in 6 volumes in 1916, and subsequently in 7 volumes in 1920. A small collection of selected excerpts with transcriptions of organ and violin music was also published separately in 1916 as Sechs Tonstücke (Six Tone Pieces).

== Busoni and Bach ==
In 1870 Busoni began learning to play the piano while the family was living in Paris, shortly before his fourth birthday. His mother, Anna Weiß-Busoni, a well-regarded professional pianist, was his teacher. Not long afterward, the family returned to Trieste, and his father, Ferdinando, a professional clarinetist, went on tour. Early in 1873, upon returning to Trieste, his father took charge of Ferruccio's musical education, including instruction in composition as well as piano. "I have to thank my father for the good fortune that he kept me strictly to the study of Bach in my childhood," Busoni wrote in the epilogue to the Collected Edition,

and that in a country in which the master was rated little higher than a Carl Czerny. My father was a simple virtuoso on the clarinet, who liked to play fantasias on Il Trovatore and the Carnival of Venice; he was a man of incomplete musical education, an Italian and a cultivator of the bel canto. How did such a man in his ambition for his son's career come to hit upon the very thing that was right? I can only compare it to a mysterious revelation. In this way he educated me to be a "German" musician and showed me the path that I never entirely deserted, though at the same time I never cast off the Latin qualities given me by nature.

In May 1888, Busoni and his pupil Frau Kathi Petri, Egon Petri's mother, attended a performance of Bach's Prelude and Fugue in D major at the Thomaskirche in Leipzig. She said to him, "You ought to arrange that for pianoforte." A week later he played it for her. He had not even written it down yet, but it was the first of his great transcriptions of Bach organ works (BV B 20), and he dedicated it to Kathi Petri. According to Busoni's biographer Edward J. Dent: "This was not merely the beginning of the transcriptions, what was of far deeper import, it was the beginning of that style of pianoforte touch and technique which was entirely the creation of Ferruccio Busoni."

By September Busoni had taken a position as piano teacher at the Musikinstitut in Helsinki. In a letter to Henri and Kathi Petri, Busoni wrote "I spoke with my 'superior', Director Wegelius, about methods of tuition. I asked if I should adhere to a programme, a specific method or any particular educational materials. – 'Actually we have no such things but, well – (after reflecting at some length) – one could perhaps take the Inventions of Bach as a starting point." In fact, it was with an instructive edition of Bach's Two- and Three-part Inventions (BV B 23), finished in Moscow in 1891 and dedicated to the Helsinki Musikinstitut, that Busoni began his lifelong pursuit of publishing and performing the keyboard works of Bach.

== Bearbeitung vs. Übertragung ==
Within the context of his Bach Editions, Busoni made an interesting distinction between the German terms Bearbeitung (adaptation, transcription, or arrangement) and Übertragung (transcription). Since Bearbeitung is the more general term, it was also sometimes used instead of Übertragung.

He most often used the term Bearbeitung for transcriptions of music originally written for an instrument in which the tone is produced by plucking or striking a string, e.g., harpsichord, clavichord, or lute. With such instruments the tone is loudest initially and then dies away rapidly. This property has an effect on the manner of composition for these instruments. Since a piano produces tones in an analogous manner, by the striking of the string with a felt-covered hammer, the adaptation of music written for such instruments to piano often requires very little, if any, alteration.

The term Übertragung was usually reserved for the transcription of music written for instruments which produce continuous tones, for example, the organ or violin. Pieces written for these instruments can require more alterations to preserve the original intent or spirit (German: Geist) of the music. The piano, when compared to the harpsichord, clavichord, or lute, presented technical changes (e.g., multiple steel strings for a given pitch, greater tension on the strings, larger sound board, more effective transfer of energy to the sound board) which allowed tones to be played more loudly and be sustained for a longer time. The damper pedal, which enables other strings in the instrument to vibrate in sympathy with the played string, provided the possibility of further augmentation and enrichment of the sound. Thus the piano represented an instrument on which it was possible to play transcriptions of such Tonstücke [tone pieces] more effectively. (The German term Tonstück is typically meant less specifically and translated simply as "piece of music.")

== The organ transcriptions ==
=== Essay on the Transcription of Bach's Organ Works ===
The organ, because of the full tone and sometimes massive sound, as in, for example, Toccata and Fugue in D minor, and, in addition, the use of the feet with the pedalboard, presents a particular challenge in piano transcription. Busoni wrote a 36-page essay "On the Transcription of Bach's Organ Works for the Pianoforte" which appeared as the First Appendix to Volume I of the Klavierwerke, originally published in 1894. Topics covered include (1) doublings: simple doubling of the pedal-part (five types), simple doubling of the manual-parts, doubling in the octave of all pedal- and manual-parts, tripling in octaves; (2) registration; (3) additions, omissions, liberties; (4) use of the piano-pedals: the damper-pedal (loud pedal), the soft pedal, the sustaining-pedal; interpretation (styles of playing); and supplementary: arrangements for two pianos and free adaptations. Busoni asserts at the outset that he "regards the interpretation of Bach's organ pieces on the pianoforte as essential to a complete study of Bach." A typical Busoni remark appears as a footnote: "Musical commoners still delight in decrying modern virtuosi as spoilers of the classics; and yet Liszt and his pupils (Bülow, Tausig) have done things for spreading a general understanding for Bach and Beethoven beside which all theoretico-practical pedantry seems bungling, and all brow-puckering cogitations of stiffly solemn professors unfruitful."

=== Busoni's transcription of the Toccata and Fugue in D minor ===
The Tausig transcription of Bach's Toccata and Fugue in D minor (BWV 565) (score) is well known and sometimes still performed, but the Busoni version (score) over time has proved more popular. According to Hugo Leichtentritt, Busoni's "building of the climaxes is more monumental, in simple lines, more thoughtful and much more effective than Tausig's somewhat arbitrary rise and fall...." Moreover, Busoni carefully avoids arpeggios, a technique used on piano, but not on organ. As the composer and musicologist Larry Sitsky says, "his whole method of doubling, registration (octave placement on the keyboard), pedal, and pianistic distribution is superior to Tausig's."

== Detailed listing of the Bach-Busoni editions ==
=== Busoni-Ausgabe (Klavierwerke) in 25 volumes (BA) ===
Joh. Seb. Bach. Klavierwerke unter Mitwirkung von Egon Petri und Bruno Mugellini. Herausgegeben von Ferruccio Busoni.
[Joh. Seb. Bach Keyboard works in collaboration with Egon Petri and Bruno Mugellini. Edited by Ferruccio Busoni.]
Leipzig: Breitkopf & Härtel; 1894-1923; cat. nos. 4301-4325; 25 volumes

•Notes:

1) The 25 volumes were issued over a nearly 30-year span. They include adaptations and transcriptions only.
2) Although the idea of the scheme was Busoni's, and his name appears on the cover of all 25 volumes, he actually edited only 1-5, 14-16, and 18; Egon Petri and Bruno Mugellini split the remainder between them.
3) The Bach BWV and Busoni BV B catalog numbers in parentheses are not part of the original title and are provided for reference only.

•Volumes:

I. Das Wohltemperierte Klavier. I. Teil [The Well-Tempered Clavier. Part I] (BV B 25, part 1) (scores in English and German)

Ed. by Busoni; Copyright 1894; cat. no. EB 4301; plate no. 27 451 (206 pages)

Book I: Nos. 1-8 (BWV 846-853); cat. no. 4301a
Book II: Nos. 9-16 (BWV 854-861); cat. no. 4301b
Book III: Nos. 17-24 (BWV 862-869); cat. no. 4301c
Book IV: Appendices; cat. no. 4301d

App. I: On the Transcription of Bach's Organ Works for the Piano (score)
App. II: Transcription of Organ Prelude and Fugue in E minor, BWV 533 (with Bach original also shown) (BV B 26) (score)
App. III: Analytical exposition of the fugue from Beethoven's Sonata, op. 106 (score)
App. IV: Fuge beigegebenen "Fughetta" geht in Kellners Abschrift das folgende Stück voraus: Praeludium [BWV 902a]

Reprint: Wiesbaden: Breitkopf & Härtel, n.d. [ca. 1982], cat. nos. 6860-6863, plate no. 27 451 (Sitsky)

II. Das Wohltemperierte Klavier. II. Teil [The Well-Tempered Clavier. Part II] (BV B 25, part 2) (score in German)

Ed. by Busoni; Copyright 1916; cat. no. EB 4302; plate no. 27 452 (217 pages)

Book I: Nos. 1-7 (BWV 870-876); cat. no. 4302a
Book II: Nos. 8-13 (BWV 877–882); cat. no. 4302b
Book III: Nos. 14-19 (BWV 883–888); cat. no. 4302c
Book IV: Nos. 20-24 (BWV 889–893); cat. no. 4302d

Reprint: Wiesbaden: Breitkopf & Härtel, n.d. [ca. 1982], cat. nos. EB 8276-8279, plate no. 27 452 (Sitsky)

III. 18 kleine Präludien, Fughetta [18 Short Preludes, Fughetta] (BV B 32)

4 Duette [4 Duets] (BV B 33)
Ed. by Busoni; Copyright 1916; cat. no. EB 4303; plate no. 27 453 (47 pages)
Reprint: Wiesbaden: Breitkopf & Härtel, 1985 (Roberge)

IV. Zweistimmige Inventionen [Two-part Inventions] (BWV 772-786) (BV B 23, part 1) (scores in German, English and Russian)

Ed. by Busoni; Issued 1914; cat. no. EB 4304; plate no. 19 274 (47 pages)

V. Dreistimmige Inventionen [Three-part Inventions] (BWV 787-801) (BV B 23, part 2) (scores in English and Russian)

Ed. by Busoni; Issued 1914; cat. no. EB 4305; plate no. 19 275 (39 pages)

VI. Französische Suiten 1-6 [French Suites 1-6] (BWV 812-817)

Ed. by Petri; Issued 1918; cat. no. EB 4306

VII. Englische Suiten 1-3 [English Suites 1-3] (BWV 806-808)

Ed. by Petri; Issued 1916; cat. no. EB 4307

VIII. Englische Suiten 4-6 [English Suites 4-6] (BWV 809-811)

Ed. by Petri; Issued 1917; cat. no. EB 4308

IX. Partiten 1-3 [Partitas 1-3] (BWV 825-827)

Ed. by Petri; Issued 1918; cat. no. EB 4309

X. Partiten 4-6 [Partitas 4-6] (BWV 828-830)

Ed. by Petri; Issued 1923; cat. no. EB 4310

XI. Konzerte nach B. Marcello, G. Ph. Telemann, A. Vivaldi u. a. Nr. 1-8

[Concerti after B. Marcello, G. Ph. Telemann, A. Vivaldi etc. Nos. 1-8]
Ed. by Mugellini; Issued 1915; cat. no. EB 4311

XII. Konzerte Nr. 9-16 [Concerti Nos. 9-16]

Ed. by Mugellini; Issued 1915; cat. no. EB 4312

XIII. Italienisches Konzert [Italian Concerto] (BWV 971);

Partita H moll [Partita in B minor] (BWV 1002)
Ed. by Petri; Issued 1918; cat. no. EB 4313

XIV. [Various works for clavichord, keyboard, and lute]

1) Chromatische Fantasie und Fuge [Chromatic Fantasy and Fugue], for clavichord (BWV 903) (BV B 31) (score)
2) Capriccio über die Abreise des vielgeliebten Bruders [Capriccio on the Departure of His Beloved Brother], for keyboard (BWV 992) (BV B 34) (score)
3) Fantasia, Adagio and Fuge [Fantasy, Adagio, and Fugue], for clavichord (BWV 906, 968) (BV B 37) (score)
4) Präludium, Fuge und Allegro [Prelude, Fugue, and Allegro], for lute (BWV 998) (BV B 36) (score)
Ed. by Busoni; Copyright 1915; cat. no. 4314; plate no. 27 460 (81 pages)
Reprint: Wiesbaden: Breitkopf & Härtel, 1982 (Roberge)

XV. Aria mit 30 Veränderungen [Aria with 30 variations] "Goldberg Variations," for harpsichord (BWV 988) (BV B 35) (score)

Ed by Busoni; Copyright 1915; cat. no. 4315; plate no. 27 461
Reprint: Wiesbaden: Breitkopf & Härtel, 1988 (Roberge)

XVI. Variationswerke [Works with variations]

1) Fantasie, Fuge, Andante und Scherzo [Fantasy, Fugue, Andante and Scherzo] (BWV 905, 969, 844) (BV B 42) (score)
2) Sarabande con partite [Sarabande with partitas] (BWV 990) (BV B 43) (score)
3) Aria variata alla maniera italiana [Air with variations in the Italian style] (BWV 989) (BV B 44) (score)
Ed. by Busoni; Copyright 1921; cat. no. EB 4316; plate no. 27 462 (35 pages)
Reprint: Wiesbaden: Breitkopf & Härtel, 1982 (Roberge)

XVII. Tokkaten [Toccatas]

Ed. by Petri; Issued 1922; cat. no. EB 4317

XVIII. [Toccatas, Fantasia and Fugue in A minor, for clavichord]

1) Drei Tokkaten u. Fugen [Three Toccatas and Fugues], for clavichord (BWV 914-916) (BV B 39);
2) Fantasie und Fuge a moll [Fantasia and Fugue in A minor], for clavichord (BWV 904) (BV B 41)
Ed. by Busoni; Copyright 1920 and 1918; cat. no. EB 4318; plate nos. 27 464 and 27 972 (44 pages)
Reprint: Wiesbaden: Breitkopf & Härtel, 1981 (Roberge)

XIX. Präludien und Fugen [Preludes and Fugues]

Ed. by Mugellini; Issued 1917; cat. no. 4319

XX. Präludien, Fughetten, Fugen [Preludes, Fughetti, Fugues]

Ed. by Mugellini; Issued 1917; cat. no. 4320

XXI. Fugen [Fugues]

Ed. by Mugellini; Issued 1917; cat. no. 4321

XXII. Fantasien (Präludien) und Fugen [Fantasies (Pleludes) and Fugues]

Ed. by Petri; Issued 1922; cat. no. 4322

XXIII. Suiten [Suites]

Ed. by Petri; Issued 1923; cat. no. 4323

XXIV. Suiten und 2 Sonaten [Suites and 2 Sonatas]

Ed. by Mugellini; Issued 1921; cat. no. 4324

XXV. 3 Sonaten [3 Sonatas];

Konzert und Fuge C moll [Concerto and Fugue in C minor] (BWV 909);
Capriccio E dur [Capriccio in E major] (BWV 993);
3 Menuette [3 Menuets]
Ed. by Petri; Issued 1923; cat. no. 4325

•Ref: Kindermann, p. 464-5; Sitsky, pp. 177-179; Roberge, pp. x, 50-53.

=== Sechs Tonstücke ===
Ich ruf' zu dir, Herr (BWV 639)
Busoni's arrangement for piano, performed by Chiara Bertoglio

Joh. Seb. Bach. Sechs Tonstücke. Klavier-Übertragung von Ferruccio Busoni. Neue durchgesehene Ausgabe
[Joh. Seb. Bach. Six Tone Pieces. Piano transcriptions by Ferruccio Busoni. New revised edition]
Leipzig: Breitkopf & Härtel; Copyright 1902; cat. no. V.A. 1916 (49 pages)

•Note: Selected transcriptions of organ and violin works.

•Contents:

1) Präludium und Fuge (D-Dur) für die Orgel. (BWV 532) Zum Konzertvorträge für Pianoforte bearbeitet. (BV B 20) (score)
[Prelude and Fugue in D major for organ. Transcribed for concert performance.]

2) Vier Orgelchoralvorspiele [Four Chorale Preludes for Organ] (BV B 27) (score)

BWV 645: Wachet auf, ruft uns die Stimme [Awake, the Voice commands.]
BWV 615: In dir ist Freude [In Thee is joy]
BWV 639: Ich ruf' zu dir, Herr Jesu Christ [I call to Thee, Lord Jesus Christ]
BWV 734: Nun freut euch, lieben Christen [Rejoice, beloved Christians]

3) Chaconne for Violine allein. [Chaconne for violin solo] [from Partita II for Violin, BWV 1004] (BV B 24) (score)

•Ref: Kindermann, p. 466; Roberge, pp. x, 49-51.

=== Bach-Busoni Collected Edition ===
==== BB6: in 6 volumes (1916) ====
Bach-Busoni. Gesammelte Ausgabe. Bearbeitungen, Übertragungen, Studien und Kompositionen für Pianoforte nach Johann Sebastian Bach von Ferruccio Busoni. Vollständige und vervollkommnete Ausgabe.
[Bach-Busoni. Collected Edition. Adaptations, Transcriptions, Studies, and Compositions for Pianoforte after Johann Sebastian Bach by Ferruccio Busoni. Complete and improved edition.]
Leipzig: Breitkopf & Härtel; 1916; cat. nos. BB I – BB VI; 6 volumes

•Note: In addition to adaptations and transcriptions of pieces by Bach, the set includes original compositions by Busoni, which are paraphrases or free adaptations of works by Bach.

•Volumes:

I. Bearbeitungen I, Lehrstücke [Adaptations, I. Study Pieces]

1) Widmung [Dedication]

[Widmung is a complete miniature combining the B-A-C-H signature motif with the Fugue in C major (BWV 846) from Book I of the Well-Tempered Clavier.]

2) 18 Kleine Präludien, Fughetta [18 Short Preludes, Fughetta], for clavichord (except BWV 999, for lute) (BV B 32)
3) 15 zweistimmige Inventionen [15 Two-part Inventions], for harpsichord (BWV 772-786) (BV B 23, part 1)
4) 15 dreistimmige Inventionen [15 Three-part Inventions], for harpsichord ()BWV 787-801) (BV B 23, part 2)
5) 4 Duette [4 Duets], for harpsichord (BWV 802-805) (BV B 33)
6) Präludium, Fuge und Allegro Es Dur [Prelude, Fugue, and Allegro in E-flat major], for lute (BWV 998) (BV B 36)

II. Bearbeitungen II, Meisterstücke [Adaptations, II. Masterpieces]

1) Chromatische Fantasie und Fuge [Chromatic Fantasy and Fugue], for clavichord (BWV 903) (BV B 31)
2) Klavierkonzert, D Moll [Harpsichord Concerto in D minor] (BWV 1052) (tr. for two pianos) (BV B 30)
3) Aria mit 30 Veränderungen [Aria with 30 variations] "Goldberg Variations," for harpsichord (BWV 988), BV B 35)

III. Übertragungen [Transcriptions]

1) Präludium und Fuge für die Orgel, D Dur. [Prelude and Fugue for Organ in D major] (BWV 532) (BV B 20)
2) Präludium und Fuge für die Orgel, Es Dur. [Prelude and Fugue for Organ in E-flat major] (BWV 552) (BV B 22)
3) Orgel-Tokkata, D Moll [Toccata for Organ in D minor] (BWV 565) (BV B 29)
4) Orgel-Tokkata, C Dur [Toccata for Organ in C major] (BWV 564) (BV B 29)
5) Zehn Orgel-Choral-Vorspiele [Ten Chorale Preludes for Organ] (BV B 27)
6) Chaconne für Violine [Chaconne for Violin] (from BWV 1004) (BV B 24)

IV. Kompositionen und Nachdichtungen [Compositions and Free Adaptations]

1) Fantasia [nach Johann Sebastian Bach] (BV 253) (score)
2) Preludio, Fuga e Fuga figurata [Prelude, Fugue and Invented Fugue] (BV 254, no. 2) (score)
3) Capriccio, B Dur, über die Abreise [Capriccio on the Departure], for keyboard (BV B 34)
4) Fantasie, Adagio und Fuge, C Moll [Fantasy, Adagio, and Fugue in C minor] (BV B 37)
5) Choral-Vorspiel nebst Fuge über ein Bachsches Fragment [Chorale Prelude and Fugue on a Fragment by Bach] (Fantasia contrappuntistica, edizione minore) (BV 256a) (score)
6) Fantasia contrappuntistica [Contrapuntal Fantasy] (edizione definitiva) (BV 256) (score)

V. Das Wohltemperierte Klavier, I [The Well-Tempered Clavier, I] (BV B 25, part 1)

[For details see Busoni-Ausgabe, Vol. 1.]

VI. Das Wohltemperierte Klavier, II [The Well-Tempered Clavier, II] (BV B 25, part 2)

[For details see Busoni-Ausgabe, Vol. 2.]

•Ref: Kindermann, p. 465-6; Sitsky, p. 179; Roberge, pp. x, 49-52.

==== BB7: in 7 volumes (1920) ====
Bearbeitungen, Übertragungen, Studien und Kompositionen für Pianoforte nach Johann Sebastian Bach von Ferruccio Busoni. Vollständige und vervollkommnete Ausgabe.
[Adaptations, Transcriptions, Studies, and Compositions for Pianoforte after Johann Sebastian Bach by Ferruccio Busoni. Complete and improved edition.]
Leipzig: Breitkopf & Härtel; 1920; cat. nos. BB I – BB VII; 7 volumes

•Volumes:

I. to VI. (The same as for BB6)

VII. Bearbeitungen, Übertragungen, Studien und Kompositionen. [Adaptations, Transcriptions, Studies, and Compositions.]

Bearbeitungen [Adaptations]:

1) Drei Tokkaten in e-Moll, g-Moll und G-Dur [Three Toccatas in E minor, G minor and G major] (BV B 39)
2) Fantasie und Fuge a moll [Fantasia and Fugue in A minor] (BV B 41)
3) Fantasie, Fuge, Andante und Scherzo [Fantasy, Fugue, Andante and Scherzo] (BV B 42)

Übertragungen [Transcriptions]:

4) Chromatische Fantasie und Fuge für Violoncell und Klavier übertragen (BV B 38)
[Chromatic Fantasy and Fugue transcribed for cello and piano]

Kompositionen und Nachdichtungen [Compositions and Free Adaptations]:

5) Improvisation über das Bachsche Chorallied "Wie wohl ist mir, o Freund der Seele"" für zwei Klaviere (BV 271)
[Improvisation on the Bach chorale "How good I feel, O friend of the soul"]
6) Kanonische Variationen und Fuge (über das Thema Friedrich des Großen) aus J. S. Bach's "Musikalisches Opfer" gezogen und für Klavier dargestellt. (BV B 40)
[Canonic Variations and Fugue (on a theme by Frederic the Great) extracted from the "Musical Offering" and prepared for piano]
7) Sonatina brevis. In Signo Joannis Sebastiani Magni. In freier Nachdichtung von Bachs Kleiner Fantasie und Fuge d-Moll. (BV 280)
[Brief sonatina. In the style of Johann Sebastian the Great. In free adaption of Bach's Little Fantasy and Fugue in D minor.]

Anhang [Appendix]:

8) Versuch einer organischen Klavier-Notenschrift. [Attempt at an organic piano notation.]

•Ref: Kindermann, p. 465-6; Sitsky, pp. 179-180; Roberge, pp. x, 38, 40, 49-52.

==== Klavierübung: Volume 8 (1925) ====
Although it is not concerned specifically with the music of Bach, the second collected edition of Busoni's Klavierübung was published by Breitkopf & Härtel posthumously (in 1925) as volume 8 of this series (cat. no. F.B. VIII).

== Reprints by other publishers ==
The music of the Bach-Busoni editions is now in the public domain and has been selectively reissued by other publishers:

=== Masters Music editions ===
The following items have been published by Masters Music Publications:

Chromatic Fantasy and Fugue, BWV 903 (tr. for cello & piano by Busoni), [1994], cat. no. M2346 (BV B 38)
Collected Keyboard Works (ed. Busoni, Petri)

•Volumes:

1. English Suites Nos. 1-3, BWV 806-808 [ed. Petri], 1994, cat. no. M2139 [from BA7]
2. English Suites Nos. 4-6, BWV 809-811 [ed. Petri], 1994, cat. no. M2221 [from BA8]
3. Six French Suites, BWV 812-817 [ed. Petri], 1991, cat. no. M1590 [from BA6]
4. Goldberg Variations, BWV 988 [ed. Busoni], [198-? or 1992?], cat. no. M1945 (BV B 35) [from BA15]
5. Clavier-Übung II: Italian Concerto, BWV 971 [ed. Petri]; Partita in B minor, BWV 831 [ed. Petri], [1991?], cat. no. M1591 [from BA18]
6. Clavier-Ubung I: Partiten Nos. 1-3, BWV 825-827 [ed. Petri], 1990, cat. no. M1592 [from BA9]
7. Clavier-Ubung I: Partiten Nos. 4-6, BWV 828-830 [ed. Petri], 1991, cat. no. M1593 [from BA10]
8. Smaller Works; Book 1 [ed. Busoni], 1992, cat. no. M1973 [from BA16]

a) Fantasy, Fugue, Andante and Scherzo (BV B 42)

i) Fantasia und Fuga in D minor, BWV 905 [spurious]
ii) Andante in G minor, BWV 969 [spurious]
iii) Scherzo in D minor, BWV 844 [actual composer: W.F. Bach]

b) Sarabande con Partite in C major, BWV 990 [spurious] (BV B 43)
c) Aria Variata alla Maniera Italiana, BWV 989 (BV B 44)

9. Smaller Works, Book 2: Inventions, BWV 772-801 [ed. Busoni], 1991, cat. no. M1589 (BV B 23) [from BA4 and BA5]

Organ Chorale-Preludes (tr. Busoni), [1990?], cat. no. M1195 (BV B 27)
Partita No. 2 in D minor, BWV 1004: Chaconne (tr. Busoni), [1989], cat. no. 1256 (BV B 24)
Prelude and Fugue in D major, BWV 532 (tr. Busoni), [1989], cat. no. M1298 (BV B 20)
Prelude and Fugue in E-flat major 'St. Anne', BWV 552, [1989], cat. no. M1196 (BV B 36)
Toccata in D minor, BWV 565, [1989], cat. no. M1277 (BV B 29)
Toccata in C major, BWV 564, [1989], cat. no. M1299 (BV B 29)
Two Contrapuntal Studies after J.S. Bach, [ca. 1999], cat. no. M3119

1) Fantasy and Fugue in A minor. BWV 904 (BV B 41)
2) Canonic Variations and Fugue from the "Musical Offering," BWV 1079 (BV B 40)

=== Dover edition ===
Toccata and Fugue in D minor and the Other Bach Transcriptions for Solo Piano
Dover Publications, 1996, ISBN 0-486-29050-6
•Note: Includes the same items as Vol III of the BB6. However, the actual sources are other publications of the same pieces as noted below.

1) Prelude and Fugue in D Major, BWV 532 [from Breitkopf & Härtel, EB 3355] (BV B 20)
2) Prelude and Fugue in E-flat Major ("St. Anne"), BWV 552 [from "unidentified authoritative edition, n.d."] (BV B 36)
3) Toccata in C Major (Prelude, Intermezzo and Fugue), BWV 564 [from Vol 1628 of Schirmer's Library of Musical Classics by G. Schirmer, Inc., "published 1942."] (BV B 29)
4) Toccata and Fugue in D Minor, BWV 565 [from Breitkopf & Härtel, EB 1372] (BV B 29)
5) Chaconne in D Minor (from Partita II for Violin, BWV 1004) [from Breitkopf & Härtel, EB 2334] (BV B 24)
6) Ten Chorale-Preludes [from Breitkopf & Härtel, EB 2459 (Nos. 1-5) and EB 2460 (Nos. 6-9)] (BV B 27)

== See also ==
- List of adaptations by Ferruccio Busoni
- Catalog of original compositions by Ferruccio Busoni
- List of recorded compositions by Ferruccio Busoni
- Free scores by Ferruccio Busoni at the International Music Score Library Project (IMSLP)
