= Transcendental Étude No. 4 (Liszt) =

Composition for piano by Franz Liszt

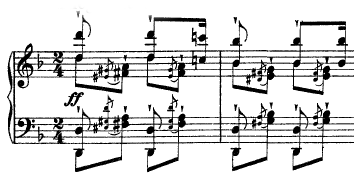
Excerpt from the 'Allegro deciso' section of Transcendental Étude No. 4

Transcendental Étude No. 4 in D minor, "Mazeppa" is the fourth of twelve Transcendental Études by Franz Liszt. It was published in 1852, and is part of a much larger cultural legacy of Mazeppa.

Lord Byron wrote an epic poem Mazeppa in 1818, but Liszt's Mazeppa is based upon a poem by Victor Hugo which was published in 1829 as a part of a collection Les Orientales. Hugo's poem is included in Liszt's original manuscript.

== History ==
At the age of fifteen (1826), Liszt published twelve piano pieces titled Étude en 48 exercises dans les tons majeur et mineurs. In 1838, he revisited these compositions and republished the collection with a new title, 24 Grandes études. Seven years later (1840), Liszt reworked the fourth étude and titled it Mazeppa. This reimagined étude was reworked to express the elements of Victor Hugo's poem from the 1829 collection Les Orientales. Mazeppa was reworked for a final time in 1851 and the new version was given the title Transcendental Étude No. 4. The final version of the piano étude led to the orchestrated symphonic poem Mazeppa.

== Form ==
This étude features distinct sections, separated by progressions in double octaves. After a short ad libitum cadenza, the main theme is presented in octaves accompanied by thirds in the center of the keyboard, giving the impression of a horse galloping in a cloud of dust. The theme returns immediately this time with a thinner texture. After a chromatic scale in alternating octaves arrives, the middle section "Lo stesso tempo" occurs in which the left hand plays a modified version of the theme while the right hand plays arpeggios in intervals up and down the keyboard. An "Il canto espressivo ed appassionato assai" (transl. "Sung expressively and with much passion") immediately follows in which the main theme reappears, this time accompanied by repeated thirds in both hands in addition to a chromatic scale in the left.

The original theme makes a more recognizable return in the "Animato" (more animated). Yet the horse returns galloping faster than he has ever before, as illustrated in the "Allegro deciso," where a variation of the original theme is played at a much quicker tempo.

Finally, a grandiose finale represents Liszt's interpretation of the last verse of the poem: "il tombe enfin, et se relève roi!" (transl. "he falls then rises a king).

== Technical difficulties ==
Mazeppa is ranked among the most difficult of the twelve études both musically and technically, alongside Feux follets (the fifth in the set). According to G. Henle Verlag, a German publisher of sheet music, it is rated at the highest difficulty along with five other compositions within this set of Transcendental Études. Successful execution requires great speed and endurance, as well as a complete familiarity with the piano due to the abundance of jumps that span more than an octave.

Liszt indicates a rather odd fingering: the fast successive thirds in the beginning two sections should be played only with the index and fourth finger, alternating hands every two intervals. This fingering may seem to hinder speed, is more difficult than moving from the thumb and third finger for the first interval to the index and fourth for the second interval, and is therefore not used by every performer. However, this fingering is given for specific purposes; it makes the consecutive thirds sound more like a horse by preventing legato and expressive playing, and builds strength in the second and fourth fingers. Earlier versions were marked "Staccatissimo"; some later editions are marked "Sempre fortissimo e con strepito."

An earlier version of this piece was published under the same name in 1847 (S.138, composed in 1840). However, it was based on the fourth étude from Douze Grandes Études (S.137). Hence they are more similar in form than the last published version.
