= Transcendence (Vince book) =

2019 book on human evolution by Gaia Vince

Transcendence: How Humans Evolved Through Fire, Language, Beauty, and Time
- Author: Gaia Vince
- Language: English
- Subject: Evolutionary psychology
- Genre: Essay
- Publisher: Penguin Books, Basic Books
- Publication date: 2019-11-07 (Penguin); 2020-01-07 (Basic)
- Pages: 320
- ISBN: 978-0-2412-8111-6

Transcendence: How Humans Evolved Through Fire, Language, Beauty, and Time is a non-fiction book by Gaia Vince published in 2019. It describes how human evolution was shaped by genetic, environmental and cultural factors. It has been reviewed by several science publications, including Nature.

== Summary ==
Vince offers a synthesis of the contemporary research in genetics, anthropology, palaeontology, archaeology and neurology to describe the peculiar evolution of the human race. To Vince, genetics, the environment and culture all contributed to human evolution, each factor influencing the other two. For example, she shows how language is influenced not only by the evolution of the voice box, but also by climate. She describes how language, in turn, influences the way we think and may even have some effects on gene selection.

She identifies an increased energy consumption as one of the ways by which we have evolved into the planet-dominating species we are now. Humans have learned to multiply the amount of energy at their disposal, from cooking to reduce time spent consuming food, all the way to the use of machines and electronics.

Vince elaborates on the social, cooperative nature of the human animal. Contrary to chimpanzees, humans chose to form social groups and reproduce beyond their family or clan, even with neanderthals. A large part of the brain keeps track of relationships with an increasingly greater number of acquaintances. By imitation, storytelling and instruction, humans access and share the species' common knowledge pool: survival techniques such as foraging and cooking, but also social norms and prejudices.

Referring to concepts she introduced in her first book, Vince examines the global impact humanity has on the planet, and the implications of resource scarcity on future human development. She paints a picture of a highly coherent and stratified society (a superorganism) where only some individuals have the means of living a fulfilling existence, leaving those at the margins highly vulnerable.

== Critical reception ==
Writing for Nature, Tim Radford calls the book a "hugely enjoyable sprint through human evolutionary history". Rather than new science, Vince's offers a review of paleontological research that reads like "a mosaic of tersely introduced evidence", but one worth reading.

In Geographical, Alan Lane invites the reader to see the book as "a vital argument that future humanity will be greater than the sum of its parts. And that great does not always mean good."

For The Wire Science, M.R. O'Connor compares Vince's style to Jared Diamond, Steven Pinker, Bill Bryson, and Yuval Noah Harari, calling it "approachable, smart, and very ambitious". Vince is "uniquely talented" in weaving together research from a variety of disciplines. She is, however, prone to make unsupported statements or generalizations and the conclusion about the future of humanity seem rather vague after such a detailed account of our past evolution.

== See also ==
- Race and intelligence
- David Reich
