= Études (Rautavaara) =

Six piano études (1969) by Einojuhani Rautavaara

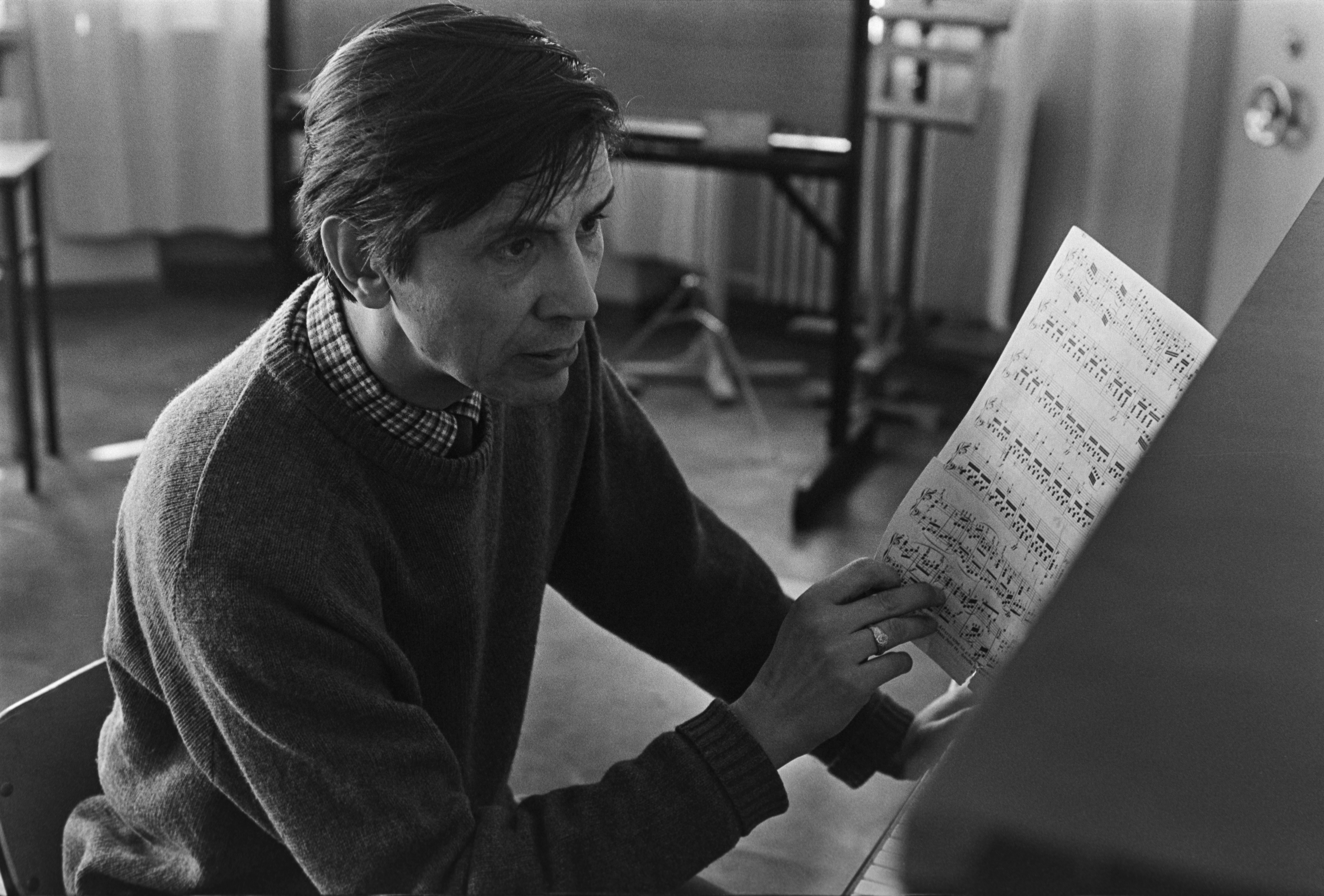
Einojuhani Rautavaara in 1969

Einojuhani Rautavaara's composed six Études (Finnish: Etydit), Op. 42, in 1969. According to the composer, the intent in writing these études, each of which explores a single interval, was to "...reintroduce a sonorous, broad piano style using the entire compass of the keyboard, presenting this wonderful instrument in its full abundance." Matambo, in her study of the composer's solo piano works, noted that the composer also referred to the works as "interval experiments", and that with the exception of the first of the études (Terssit) all of the pieces exploit dissonance.

1. Terssit (Thirds)
2. Septimit (Sevenths)
3. Tritonukset (Tritones)
4. Kvartit (Fourths)
5. Sekunnit (Seconds)
6. Kvintit (Fifths)
