= Transcendental Étude No. 1 (Liszt) =

Composition for piano by Franz Liszt

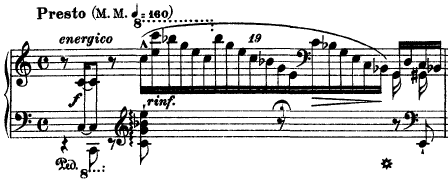
The opening bar of the Transcendental Étude No. 1

Transcendental Étude No. 1 in C major, "Preludio" is the first of twelve Transcendental Études by Franz Liszt. It is the shortest étude of the set, lasting approximately a minute.

== Form ==
The piece begins with low octave Cs, followed by a downward run made up of an arpeggiated C^{7} chord. A furious set of impetuous notes then climb chromatically, and it returns to the octaved Cs and the downward run. The furious set of notes climbs even higher and a set of loud chords blare in fff. The left hand then plays loud, low pitched trills in succession. After that, the right hand plays some intense arpeggiated figures, closing with a final chord. This étude is the least difficulty of the set barring Transcendental Étude No. 3 (Paysage).
