= Transcendental Étude No. 6 (Liszt) =

Composition for piano by Franz Liszt

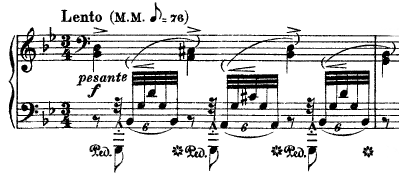
The first bar of the Transcendental Étude No. 6

Transcendental Étude No. 6 in G minor, "Vision" is the sixth of twelve Transcendental Études by Franz Liszt. It is a study of the extensions of the hand, hands moving in opposite directions, arpeggiated double notes, and tremolos.

It is one of the less difficult études out of Liszt's 12 Transcendental Études, though the beginning of the piece can be quite troublesome if it is played as directed: completely with the left hand (linked hand in the second edition [Dover]). It would require large stretches and dexterous leaps if done so.

== Visual image ==
The visual image of this piece is a funeral. The middle section's wild octaves and rapidly climbing and descending arpeggios are filled with exaltation (as the original notes Franz Liszt scripted).
