= Transcendental Étude No. 7 (Liszt) =

Composition for piano by Franz Liszt

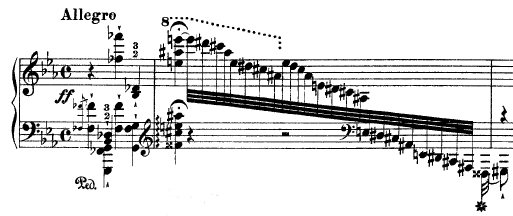
The first two bars of the Transcendental Étude No. 7

Transcendental Étude No. 7 in E♭ major, "Eroica" is the seventh of the twelve Transcendental Études by Franz Liszt. It is a study of rapid downward runs, bravura and octaves (at the end).

In a customary manner of Liszt, the piece begins with some sharp notes and fast, powerful descending scales. The "heroic" theme is then introduced. The piece becomes more chaotic and finally erupts in difficult octave arpeggiations. It ends with a final restatement of the theme.

Many composers and pianists, including Leslie Howard and Ferruccio Busoni, consider the 1837 version of this piece superior to the final Transcendental version.

== Difficulties ==
The main theme, beginning on measure 20, makes use of the sostenuto pedal. It requires precise coordination to only sustain the fanfare-like melody, with the pizzicato accompaniment in the background.
