= Transcendental Étude No. 12 (Liszt) =

Composition for piano by Franz Liszt

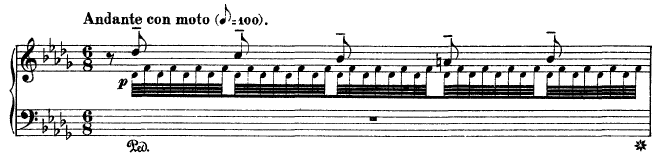
The first bar of the Transcendental Étude No. 12

Transcendental Étude No. 12 in B♭ minor, "Chasse-neige" (snow-whirls) is the last of twelve Transcendental Études by Franz Liszt. The étude is a study in tremolos but contains many other difficulties like wide jumps and fast chromatic scales, and it requires a very gentle and soft touch in the beginning. The piece gradually builds up to a powerful climax. It is one of the most difficult piano pieces, being ranked 9 out of 9 by publisher G. Henle Verlag—the highest possible difficulty ranking.

Ferruccio Busoni stated the étude was the "noblest example, perhaps, amongst all music of a poetising nature." He described the work as "a sublime and steady fall of snow which gradually buries landscape and people".
