= Transcendental Étude No. 11 (Liszt) =

Composition for piano by Franz Liszt

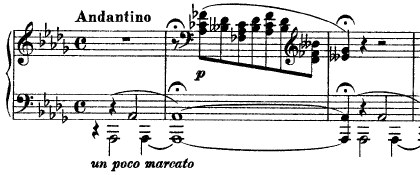
The first three bars of the Transcendental Étude No. 11

Transcendental Étude No. 11 in D♭ major, "Harmonies du soir" is the eleventh of twelve Transcendental Études by Franz Liszt. This étude is a study in harmonies, broken chords played in quick succession, full octave jumps, chromatic harmonies, chord variations, interlocking hands, bravura, massive chords, and pedalling.

== Innovations ==
Experiments in tonal ambiguity and 'impressionistic' sonorities mark this as a forward-looking work.

== Origin ==
"Harmonies du soir" was rooted from the seventh of the Études S.136, which was a study in alternating hands. The similarities in melody are apparent.

== Content ==
The piece begins with an introduction containing slow broken octaves in the left hand and chords in the right hand. After a group of arpeggios, the main theme is introduced in the left hand, a beautiful descent followed by a chromatic ascent with harmonies changing with each note. It is accompanied in the right hand by bass notes (crossing over) and octaves which seem to "sing along" with the left hand. Eventually, after a buildup with large chords in the right hand and octaves deep in the bass in the left hand, this theme is played again this time with harp like arpeggios in both hands. The piece continues in this manner for a while until the second theme, a chordal section marked Poco più mosso is introduced. It begins pianississimo but then grows to an appassionato climax. The music then seems to fade out, followed by an entire new section of the piece, marked Più lento con intimo sentimento. This section's song like melody is accompanied by arpeggiation in both hands (bringing out the main melody is a surprising technical feat, due to the wide spacing of the arpeggios in each hand). After a recitative passage, the music goes somewhere unexpected. The second theme is brought back, this time fortissimo and marked trionfante with chords in both hands. The most technically difficult part of the entire piece consists of multiple pages of chordal jumps and repetition, requiring a large amount of stamina. The music eventually dies down, and after an arpeggiated variation of the first theme, the music dies out.
