= Transcendental Étude No. 8 (Liszt) =

Composition for piano by Franz Liszt

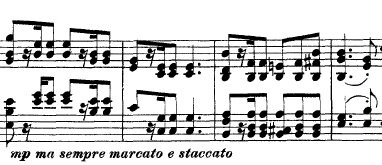
The main theme of the Transcendental Étude No. 8, in E-flat major

Transcendental Étude No. 8 in C minor, "Wilde Jagd" (Wild Hunt) is the eighth of twelve Transcendental Études by Franz Liszt. The piece has been described as "dramatic", depicting "a ghostly, supernatural chase" with an "energetic conclusion".

The 1837 version of this piece is in sonata form, with a first subject in C minor, second subject in E♭ major, and a recapitulation of the first subject. It is monothematic (the second subject material is derived from the first subject material). Liszt removed the final recapitulation of the first subject in the 1851 version of the piece, along with an extended bravura passage preceding it.

The piece starts with a furious quick main theme, left hand playing the melody in octaves and the right hand playing the same melody one octave higher alternatively, quickly followed with chords. The furious main theme flows into the playful melody of the secondary subject. When actually played at the original speed that Liszt indicated ("Presto furioso", or fast and furious; at around 4 1/2 minutes), the piece quickly becomes formidable. Wide jumps in the beginning span about three octaves in the right hand. The lyrical middle section involves some difficult left-hand jumps rapidly spanning over two octaves. The ending involves a difficult section of octave jumps in the right hand spanning three octaves. The piece ends in a flurry of descending chords.
