= Transcendental Études =

Set of études by Franz Liszt

- Piano études by Franz Liszt
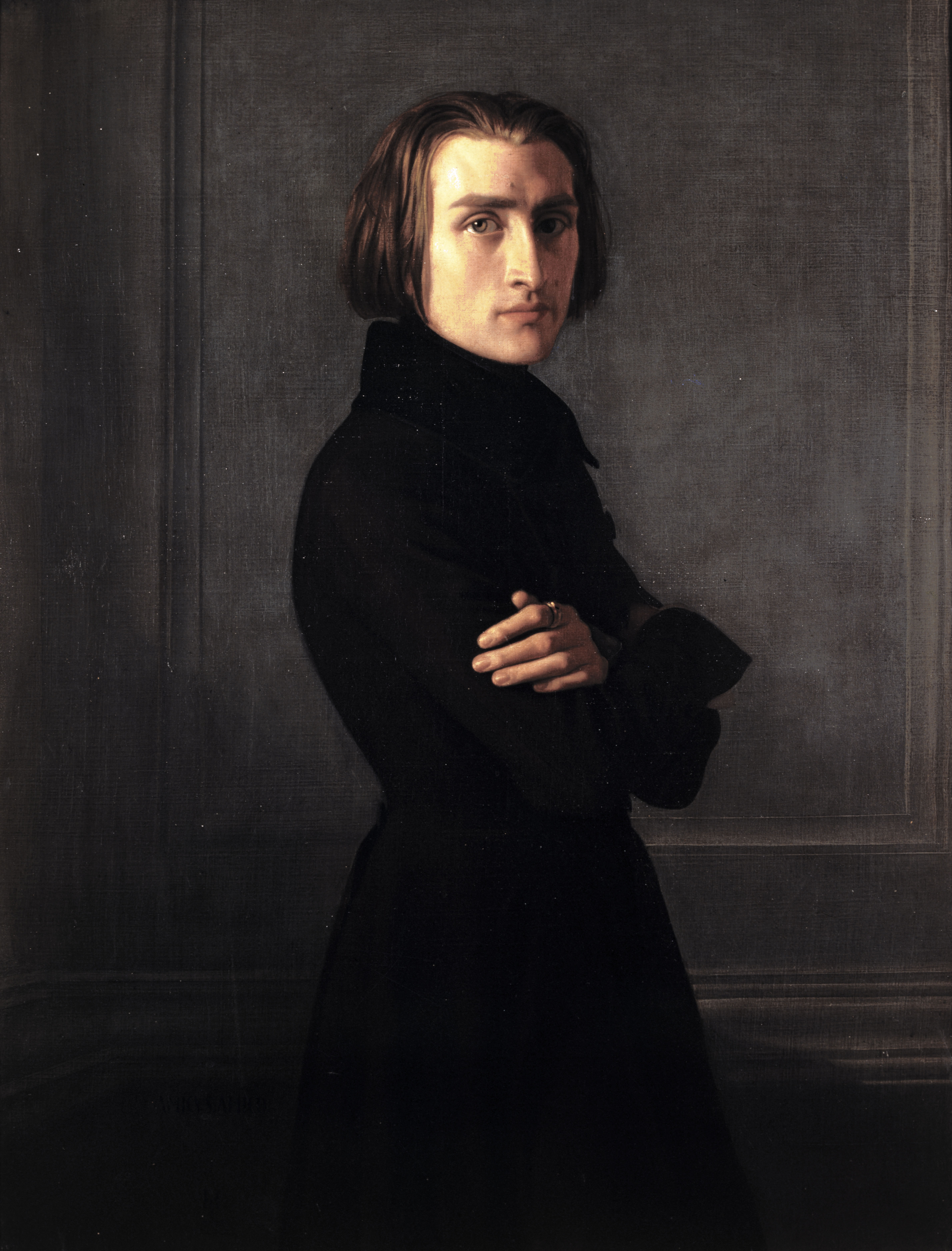
- Portrait of Franz Liszt by Henri Lehmann (1839)
- Native name: Études d'exécution transcendante
- Catalogue: S.139
- Year: 1837
- Based on: Étude en douze exercices, S.136
- Dedication: Carl Czerny
- Published: 1852
- Movements: 12

The Transcendental Études (French: Études d'exécution transcendante), S.139, is a set of twelve compositions for piano by Franz Liszt. They were published in 1852 as a revision of an 1837 set (which had not borne the title "d'exécution transcendante"), which in turn were – for the most part – an elaboration of a set of studies written in 1826.

No.	Name	Key
1	Preludio	C major
2	(Molto Vivace)	A minor
3	Paysage	F major
4	Mazeppa	D minor
5	Feux follets	B♭ major
6	Vision	G minor
7	Eroica	E♭ major
8	Wilde Jagd	C minor
9	Ricordanza	A♭ major
10	(Allegro agitato molto)	F minor
11	Harmonies du soir	D♭ major
12	Chasse-neige	B♭ minor

== History ==
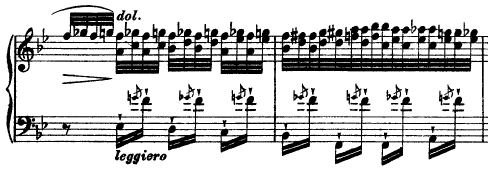
The Transcendental Études contain extreme technical difficulties, such as the right hand configuration and left hand leaps in the Transcendental Étude No. 5.

The genesis of the Transcendental Études goes back to 1826, when 15-year-old Liszt wrote a set of youthful exercises called the Étude en douze exercices (Study in twelve exercises), S.136. They were first published under the title "Étude pour le piano-forte, en quarante-huit exercices dans tous les tons majeurs et mineurs" ("Study for piano in 48 exercises in all major and minor keys"), however there were only twelve of them; Liszt never completed the intended 48. These pieces were not particularly technically demanding compared to their later counterparts.

Liszt then returned to these pieces for thematic ideas, expanding them considerably, in the composition of the Douze Grandes Études (Twelve Grand Studies), S.137, which were first published in 1840 under the title "24 Grandes Études pour le Piano" ("24 Grand Studies for Piano"; again the intended project of additional studies was never completed). The seventh of the previous set became the eleventh of this set, and the eleventh of the previous set was dropped, with a new composition in seventh place. This set is often considered to be more technically demanding than the later S.139 counterparts.

The Transcendental Études, S.139, are revisions of the Douze Grandes Études. The fourth was altered and published alone as Mazeppa in late 1846, and the collection as a whole was published in 1852 and dedicated to Carl Czerny, Liszt's piano teacher, and himself a prolific composer of études. Liszt made numerous textual changes in the final revision of the set, adapting the technical demands to facilitate execution on pianos with heavier keyboard action.

When revising the 1837 set of études into their final "Transcendental" versions, Liszt added programmatic titles in French and German to all but two of the pieces, Études Nos. 2 and 10. In his edition of the work, Ferruccio Busoni respectively called them Fusées (Rockets) and Appassionata, and these titles are occasionally used in modern performance. However, these alternate titles were never approved by Liszt himself, and, generally, in scholarly reference, in performance, and in authoritative urtext editions like those published by G. Henle Verlag, these two études are referred to only by their performance indications: Molto vivace and Allegro agitato molto, respectively.

Liszt's original idea was to write 24 études, one in each of the 24 major and minor keys. He completed only half of this project, using the neutral and flat key signatures. In 1897–1905 the Russian composer Sergei Lyapunov wrote his own set of Douze études d'exécution transcendante, Op. 11, continuing Liszt's cycle through the keys that Liszt had not used, namely the sharp keys, to "complete" the set of 24. Lyapunov's set of études was dedicated to the memory of Liszt, and bore titles as Liszt's set had done, with the final étude being entitled Élégie en mémoire de Franz Liszt.

Very few pianists have recorded the 1837 set, and even fewer have recorded the 1826 set (which really are works of Liszt's juvenilia). Leslie Howard is the only pianist to have recorded all three sets on a major label for international release, as part of his series of recordings for Hyperion of the complete solo piano music of Liszt.

== Selected recordings of the complete set ==
Pianist	Recorded	Label
Alexander Borovsky	1956	Vox
György Cziffra	1957–1958	EMI
Lazar Berman	1963	Melodiya
Claudio Arrau	1974–1976	Philips
Russell Sherman	1976	Vanguard
Michael Ponti	1982	Leo Records
Josef Bulva	1983	Orfeo Records
Jerome Rose	1984	Cum Laude
Jorge Bolet	1985	Decca
Vladimir Ovchinnikov	1985	Melodiya; EMI in West
Janice Weber	1988	MCA
Leslie Howard	1989	Hyperion
Jenő Jandó	1994	Naxos
Boris Berezovsky	1995–1996	Teldec
François-René Duchâble	1998	EMI
Janina Fialkowska	2000	Opening Day Recordings
Freddy Kempf	2001	BIS
Christopher Taylor	2002	Liszt Digital
Yu Kosuge	2003	Sony Classical
Bertrand Chamayou	2005	Sony
Alice Sara Ott	2009	Deutsche Grammophon
Vesselin Stanev	2010	RCA Red Seal
Mariangela Vacatello	2010	Brilliant Classics
Mélodie Zhao	2011	Claves Records
Vadym Kholodenko	2013	Harmonia Mundi
Kirill Gerstein	2016	Myrios
Daniil Trifonov	2016	Deutsche Grammophon
Mordecai Shehori	2018	Cembal d'amour
Yunchan Lim	2022	live in Fort Worth, released by Steinway & Sons
Sandro Russo	2024	Steinway & Sons
Yoav Levanon	2025	Warner Music Records

== Other works with a similar title ==
- Sergei Lyapunov, 12 Études d'exécution transcendante, Op. 11 (1897–1905)
- Kaikhosru Shapurji Sorabji, Études transcendantes (100) (1940–44), commonly known as 100 Transcendental Studies
- Brian Ferneyhough, Études transcendantales for mezzo-soprano and chamber ensemble (1982–85)
