= Transcendental Étude No. 9 (Liszt) =

Composition for piano by Franz Liszt

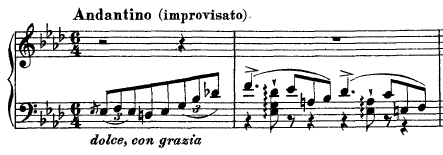
The first two bars of the Transcendental Étude No. 9

Transcendental Étude No. 9 in A♭ major, "Ricordanza" is the ninth of twelve Transcendental Études by Franz Liszt. It has wild but gentle cadenzas and demands delicate finger work. There are some areas with syncopation similar to Frédéric Chopin's Étude Op. 10, No. 3. This is a good introduction to Liszt's pianistic style.

The piece is in Rondo form, with a relatively brief recurring principle theme in between lengthy episodes.

Ferruccio Busoni referred to this piece as "a bundle of faded love letters".

The piece is quoted in the song A Dream Is a Wish Your Heart Makes from the movie Cinderella.
