= Transcendental Étude No. 2 (Liszt) =

Composition for piano by Franz Liszt

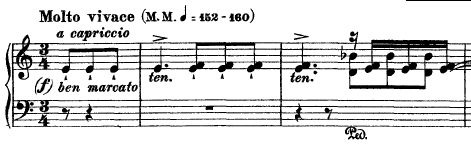
The deceptively simple first bars of the Transcendental Étude No. 2

Transcendental Étude No. 2 in A minor, "Molto vivace", is the second of twelve Transcendental Études by Franz Liszt. The occasionally-used alternate title Fusées (French: “Rockets”) is not Liszt's own and was not approved by Liszt. It was added by Ferruccio Busoni in his edition of the Études. It is a study in alternating hands, hands overlapping, both hands playing the same note alternatingly, and steep right hand leaps.

== Form ==
This piece is an extremely volatile one as fierce alternating notes in fortissimo fire away. Soon the notes alternate even more fiercely, followed by a flying right-hand arpeggio accompanied by long arpeggiated chords. Then new difficulties are introduced as the right hand jumps high up the keyboard and returns firmly, offsetting a set of same note left hand-right-hand alternations. As the climax of the piece approaches it crescendos and plays even fiercer low pitched notes, and soon the right hand figures explode with erratic chords that climb high up to the keyboard and then back down. The climax then ensues as both hands alternate on the same notes that climb 5 octaves up the keyboard and down again, then fires up again and down again. Then the right hand arpeggios recapitulate and the right hand flies even higher and steeper. After a few more loud chords, the piece finally relents.
