= Transcendental Étude No. 10 (Liszt) =

Composition for piano by Franz Liszt

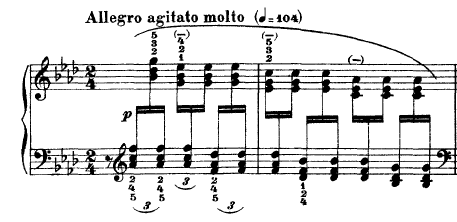
The first two bars of the Transcendental Étude No. 10

Transcendental Étude No. 10 in F minor, "Allegro agitato molto", is the tenth of twelve Transcendental Études by Franz Liszt. The occasionally-used alternate title, “Appassionata”, was not given or authorized by Liszt, but instead provided by Ferruccio Busoni, in an early edition.

Passage work for the left hand is rather difficult, while the right hand plays the melody mostly in octaves. Other difficulties include cramped spacing (the hands are often close together), left-hand arpeggiated passage work, complex figurations in polyrhythm, and the right hand ascending the keyboard in swiftness using only the thumb, the third, and fourth finger.

The étude is in sonata form, with a second group in E♭ minor, and an explosive coda. The climax occurs right after the softest part of the piece and is an octave D♭ played 22 times in a row with rhythmic changes and rapid left-hand arpeggios that constantly change theme. The 1837 version bears a coda which is modelled after the coda in the finale of Beethoven's "Appassionata" Sonata.

Evgeny Kissin was launched into the limelight in 1994 in Los Angeles performing his interpretation of Transcendental Étude No. 10 at Dorothy Chandler Pavilion. Kissin has continued to perform interpretations of Liszt's work throughout his career.

Seong-Jin Cho, South Korean pianist and 2015 gold medal winner of the International Chopin Piano Competition, performed Transcendental Étude No. 10 at the Walt Disney Concert Hall in October 2018 for his Los Angeles debut.
