= Transcendental Étude No. 3 (Liszt) =

Composition for piano by Franz Liszt

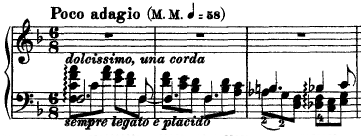
The opening theme to Transcendental Étude No. 3

Transcendental Étude No. 3 in F major, "Paysage" (Scenery) is the third of twelve Transcendental Études by Franz Liszt. It is generally considered to be one of the less difficult studies.

The piece suggests a peaceful country scene. It is said that Liszt got the idea of writing this étude while watching the scenery change during a train ride. The first section is played poco adagio with a sempre legato e placido indication at the start. There are gentle arpeggios and constant dynamic changes and syncopation, and the melody is often played in thirds or octaves.
