= Transcendental Étude No. 5 (Liszt) =

Composition for piano by Franz Liszt

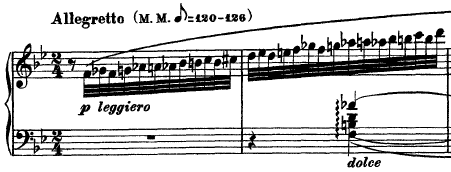
The first two measures of the Transcendental Étude No. 5

Transcendental Étude No. 5 in B♭ major, "Feux follets" (Will o' the Wisps) is the fifth of twelve Transcendental Études by Franz Liszt. It has been described as having a "delicate, gossamer" quality.

== Versions ==
As with the other Transcendental Etudes, "Feux follets" went through three versions. This first was Études en forme de douze exercises pour piano published in 1826, composed by Liszt at age 16. The second was the Douze grandes études written between 1837 and 1838 and published in 1839.

The third and final version was published in 1854. It is the last version, the Douze études d'exécution trancendante from 1854, that is most often performed.

== Difficulty ==
Its rapid double-note passages in the right hand accompanied by wide broken intervals in the left are notoriously difficult to play. In addition, the passages are often asymmetrical and unpredictable. It reaches several climaxes that are technically demanding and ends in pianissimo arpeggios.

Despite the mechanical difficulties of the work, its greatest challenge lies in doing justice to its whimsical and mysterious character. Pianissimo and leggierissimo markings abound in the double-note sections, making it more difficult to play. The piece utilizes chromatic-like scales in the right hand to provide an accompaniment to the left hand, where the melody is.
