= List of compositions by Ferruccio Busoni =

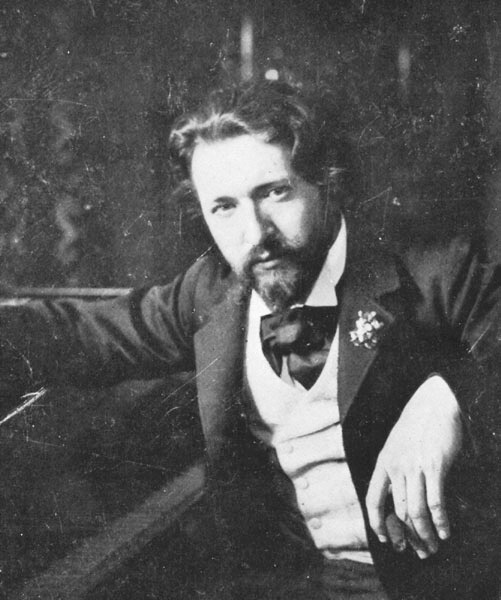
Ferruccio Busoni

This article presents a list of compositions by Ferruccio Busoni, including a large number of early works, most of which remain unpublished. The earliest preserved pieces were written when he was barely seven years old. Over 200 of the total of 303 original compositions were produced before the age of twenty.

For a more selective list of recorded works, see Ferruccio Busoni discography.

Busoni also produced a number of cadenzas, transcriptions, and editions. For a complete list see List of adaptations by Ferruccio Busoni.

== Introductory notes ==
=== Opus numbers ===
Busoni's opus numbers are confusing. Initially he numbered each work as he wrote it. Upon reaching Op. 40 he began assigning opus numbers of unpublished youthful works to new compositions. Later he started again from Op. 30, adding an "a" to Op. 30 to 36. From Op. 41 the numbering is fairly regular although it bears little relationship to the actual date of composition, and many compositions were published without opus number. Among unpublished compositions, some have two opus numbers. Because of their confusing nature Roberge recommended against using them and eliminated them from his List of Works. However, since opus numbers are written on manuscripts, included on published scores, used for identification of compositions by many recordings, and included in the standard reference works by Dent (1933), Kindermann (1980), Beaumont (1985), and Sitsky (2008), they are given here as an aid in identification. The user should be aware, however, that a particular opus number may refer to more than one item and says very little about the date of composition or publication.

=== Catalog numbers ===
The letters BV (Busoni-Verzeichnis [Busoni Catalog]) followed by a number are used for identification of Busoni's original compositions. The BV numbers are based on the first comprehensive catalog of Busoni's unpublished as well as published works prepared by Jürgen Kindermann. The letters KiV are also sometimes used, as well as the abbreviations Kind- and K. Although Kindermann himself did not specify any letters to be used for referring to his catalog, he has agreed to the use of the abbreviation BV. The catalog is not strictly chronological, since it frequently incorporates published works by the date of publication rather than the date of composition. When the catalog number is preceded by the letters BV B, for example, Ten Chorale Preludes by Bach, BV B 27, it refers to a cadenza, transcription, or adaptation (see List of adaptations by Ferruccio Busoni).

== Catalog of original compositions ==
- Note: This list is not yet complete. The "Details" column needs additional work.

BV catalog numbers are from Roberge. Titles and opus numbers are listed as in Beaumont, except as noted. Titles are in the original language, except for instrumentation and generic terms, such as "string quartet." For example, Beaumont partially translates "Berceuse pour le piano," to "Berceuse, for piano." Additional title information provided by Roberge, for example, a key signature not found in the original title, is sometimes added in parentheses. For works with text, the first line is typically given, followed by the name of the poet in parentheses. Translations, when provided, are in brackets. Dates of composition and durations are from Beaumont, unless otherwise indicated. Dedications are from Roberge.

Busoni Archive: Most of Busoni's unpublished early manuscripts, as well as those of later works, have been preserved in the Busoni-Nachlaß [Busoni-Archive]. The collection consists of 366 cataloged items, many of which were lost during the Second World War, and after the war were divided between Stiftung Preußischer Kulturbesitz, Musikabteilung, in West Berlin and the Deutsche Staatsbibliothek, Musikabteilung, in East Berlin. Kindermann lists the locations and manuscript numbers of each work, for those manuscripts which were available until the year he published his catalog (1980). Some of the lost items reappeared later; most are now at the Jagiellonian University in Cracow. After the fall of the Berlin wall, the two libraries were reunited as the Staatsbibliothek zu Berlin. Sitsky (pp. 363–383) has an appendix listing manuscripts (with numbers, locations, titles and/or a short description), including those lost, which may yet reappear, as well as those not part of the Busoni-Archive, which are either not numbered or are numbered with a different system. The Busoni-Archive manuscript numbers provided by Sitsky are prefixed with the letters "SB", a procedure which has been adopted here as well.

Abbreviations: acc., according to; arr., arrangement; SB, Staatsbibliothek zu Berlin; B&H, Breitkopf & Härtel, Leipzig (unless otherwise indicated); cat., catalog; ded., dedicated to; dur., duration; frag, fragment; fp, first performance; (score), link to score at the International Music Score Library Project; instr., instrumentation; MS, manuscript; pub., published; rev., revised; unpub., unpublished.

=== BV 1 to 100 ===
- Go to: BV 101 | BV 201 | Appendix

| Cat. no. | Title | Date(s) of composition | Details |
|---|---|---|---|
| BV 1 | Canzone [Song] (in C major) Op. 1, for piano | Jun 1873 | SB1; unpub. |
| BV 2 | Berceuse (in C major) Op. 2, for piano | Jun 1873 | SB2; unpub. |
| BV 3 | Introduzione, Tempo di Walzer e Finale [Introduction, Waltz Tempo and Finale] Op. 3, for piano | Aug 1873 | SB3; unpub. |
| BV 4 | Cadenza-Esercizio [Cadenza-Exercise] (in C major) Op. 4, for piano | Sept 1873 | SB4; unpub. |
| BV 5 | Studio [Study] (in G major) Op. 5, for piano | Oct 1873 | SB5; unpub. |
| BV 6 | Tema con Variazioni (in C major) Op. 6, for piano | Oct 1873 | SB7; unpub. |
| BV 7 | Menuetto (in C major) Op. 17, for piano | 5 October 1873; 15 October 1873 | SB16, SB28; unpub. |
| BV 8 | Preghiera alla Madonna "Vergin santa benedetta Madre" Op. 7, song for two women and piano | 15 October 1873 | SB7; unpub. |
| BV 9 | Marcia funebre (in C minor) Op. 8, for piano | 22 February 1874 | SB8; unpub. |
| BV 10 | Romanza senza parole [Romance without words] (in C minor) Op. 9, for piano | 22 February 1874 | SB9; unpub.; ded. Ersilia Grusovin |
| BV 11 | Canzone popolare (in C major) Op. 13, for piano | 17 September 1874 | SB18; unpub. |
| BV 12 | La Canzone del Cacciatore [Hunter's Song] (in C major) Op. 10, for piano | 20 September 1874 | SB10; unpub. |
| BV 13 | Preludio (in C major) Op. 11, for piano | Oct 1874 | SB11; unpub.; see BV 15 |
| BV 14 | Scherzo (in A minor) Op. 14, for piano | Oct 1874 | SB13; unpub. |
| BV 15 | Preludio (in C major), for clarinet and piano | 12 July 1875 | SB17; unpub.; arr. of BV 13 |
| BV 16 | Inno-Variato [Hymn with variations] Op. 12, for piano | Mar 1875 | SB12; unpub. |
| BV 17 | Polka (in C major) Op. 16, for piano | Jan 1875 | SB14; unpub. |
| BV 18 | Scherzo in B♭ major Op. 15, for piano | Feb 1875 | SB15; unpub. |
| BV 19 | Preludio (in C major) Op. 18, for clarinet and piano | 26 February 1875; rev. 14 July 1875 | SB20; unpub. |
| BV 20 | Preludio (in C major) Op. 19, for piano | Mar 1875 | SB19; unpub. |
| BV 21 | Preludio (in C major) Op. 20, for piano | Mar 1875 | SB21; unpub. |
| BV 22 | Sonata in D major, for piano | 20 August 1875 | SB22; unpub. |
| BV 23 | Fuga a 2 voci in stile libero [Fugue for two voices in free style], for piano | 23 August 1875 | SB23; unpub. |
| BV 24 | Studio [Study] in C major, for piano | 28 August 1875 | SB24; unpub. |
| BV 25 | Fuga a 3 voci [Fugue for 3 voices] (in A minor), for piano | 2 September 1875 | SB25; unpub. |
| BV 26 | Gavotta (in D minor), for piano | 26 September 1875 | SB26; unpub. |
| BV 27 | Inno [Hymn] (in C minor), for piano | 28 September 1875 | SB27; unpub. |
| BV 28 | Studio contrappuntato [Contrapuntal Study] (in D major), for piano | 14 October 1875 | SB29; unpub.; ded. Anna Weiß-Busoni |
| BV 29 | Capriccio (in C minor), for piano | 1 November 1875; rev. 1 December 1875 | SB32, SB42; unpub. |
| BV 30 | Presto in C minor, for piano | 25 November 1875 | SB30; unpub.; ded. Ferdinando Busoni |
| BV 31 | Invenzione a due voci (in C major), for piano | 2 December 1875 | SB31, SB44, SB46; unpub.; ded. Anna Weiß-Busoni |
| BV 32 | Inno [Hymn] (in C major), for piano | 5 December 1875 | SB33, SB45; unpub.; ded. Anna Weiß-Busoni |
| BV 33 | Mandolinata (in C minor), for piano | 25 December 1875 | SB34; unpub. |
| BV 34 | Waltzer da Concerto. Momento Musicale [Concert Waltz. Musical Moment] (in C minor), for piano | 25–27 December 1875 | SB35, SB47; unpub.; ded. Luigi Cimoso |
| BV 35 | Fuga a tre voci [Fugue for three voices] (in C minor), for harmonium or organ | 5 January 1876 | SB36; unpub., ded. Ferdinando Busoni |
| BV 36 | "Du bist wie eine Blume" (Heinrich Heine) ["You are like a flower"], song for voice and piano | 24 January 1876 | SB48?; unpub.; ded. Anna Ephrussi |
| BV 37 | Scherzo in C minor, for piano | 11 February 1876 | SB37?; unpub.; ded. Anna Weiß-Busoni |
| BV 38 | String quartet no. 1 (in C minor) | 20–23 February 1876 | SB51; unpub. |
| BV 39 | "Die Abendglocke schallet" (unknown) ["The evening bell sounds"], song for voice and piano | 3 March 1876 | SB49?; unpub.; ded. Carolina Gomperz-Bettelheim |
| BV 40 | Marcia funebre [Funeral march] (in F minor), for piano | 15 March 1876 | SB38; unpub. |
| BV 41 | Sonata in C major for violin and piano | 19 March 1876 | SB52; unpub. |
| BV 42 | String quartet no. 2 (in F minor) | 28 April 1876 | ^{v} SB53; unpub; ded |
| BV 43 | Fantaisie-Impromptu (in C minor), for piano | 6 June 1876 | SB39; unpub.; ded. Josephine von Wertheimstein |
| BV 44 | Wiegenlied [Lullaby]: "Schlafe süß in Gottes Schoß" (unknown) ["Sleep sweetly in God's lap"], for voice and piano | 15 June 1876 | SB50; unpub.; ded. Mina Gomperz |
| BV 45 | Il Dolore: Romanza senza parole [Sorrow: Romance without words] (in A minor), for piano | 21 June 1876 | ^{v} SB40, unpub, ded |
| BV 46 | Menuetto (in A minor), for piano | 3 July 1876 | SB41; unpub. |
| BV 47 | Fughetta (for four voices in C major), for piano | 9 September 1876 | SB54; unpub.; ded. Betty Preläuthner |
| BV 48 | Gavottina (in F major) Op. 3 no. 3, for piano | 11 November 1876 | ^{v} SB55; unpub |
| BV 49 | Meditazione [Meditation] (in D major), for piano | 10 December 1876 | SB57; unpub. |
| BV 50 | Invention (in C minor), for piano | 31 December 1876 | SB360; unpub |
| BV 51 | Ouverture (in E major), for (large) orchestra (fragment) | 1876 | ^{v} SB58; unpub; instr; arr |
| BV 52 | Studio [Study] (in C major), for piano | 1 January 1877 | SB59; unpub. |
| BV 53 | Untitled (Allegretto in C minor), for piano | 8 January 1877 | SB60; unpub. |
| BV 54 | Fuga in G major, for piano | 23 January 1877 | SB61; unpub. |
| BV 55 | Waise und Rose, "Wie bin ich armes Kind allein" (unknown) ["How am I poor child alone"], (song) for mezzo-soprano and piano | 7 March 1877 | SB62; unpub. |
| BV 56 | "Deh, ci guarda benedetta" (Ferruccio Busoni) ["For pity's sake, she watches us blessed"] (in E♭ major), for SATB (a cappella) | 11 May 1877 | SB63; unpub. |
| BV 57 | Sonata (No. 4 in F minor)? Op. 6, for piano (unfinished) | May 1877 | ^{v} SB78; unpub |
| BV 58 | Sonata no. 1 in C major Op. 7, for piano | 20 May 1877 | ^{v} SB64; unpub |
| BV 59 | Invenzione (in D major), for piano | 20 June 1877 | SB65; unpub |
| BV 60 | Menuetto (in F major), for string quartet | 24 June 1877 | SB66; unpub |
| BV 61 | Sonata No. 2 in D major Op. 8, for piano | 5 July 1877 | ^{v} SB67; unpub |
| BV 62 | Scherzo (in F♯ minor), for piano | Jul 1877 | ^{v} MS, pub, ded |
| BV 63 | Antiphon, "Salve decus patriarchum" (liturgical) ["Hail, O glory of the patriarchs"], for soprano, mezzo-soprano, baritone, and harmonium | 19 August 1877 | SB73; unpub |
| BV 64 | Preludio (in E minor), for piano | 4 September 1877 | ^{v} SB68; unpub |
| BV 65 | Sonata No. 3 in E major Op. 9, for piano (unfinished) | 14 September 1877 | ^{v} SB69; unpub |
| BV 66 | Allegro fugato (in E major), for piano | 30 September 1877 | SB70; unpub. |
| BV 67 | "Ave Maria," (Antiphon) Op. 1, for voice and piano | 1 October 1877 | ^{v} pub, ded |
| BV 67a | "Ave Maria," (Antiphon) Op. 1, for voice and strings | 20 June 1878 | SB91; unpub.; arr. from BV 67; instr |
| BV 68 | "Salve Regina" Op. 2, (Antiphon), for mezzo-soprano and piano | 9 October 1877 | SB71; unpub.; see BV 68a |
| BV 68a | "Salve Regina" Op. 4, (Antiphon), for mezzo-soprano and strings | undated, probably Oct 1877 | SB72; unpub.; arr. of BV 68; instr |
| BV 69 | "Pater noster," for mezzo-soprano, three-part male-voice choir and piano or harmonium | 23 December 1877 | SB74; unpub. |
| BV 70 | L'Invalido [The Invalid] Op. 31, "Ho quarant'anni per la patria" (Michele Buono) ["I have been forty years in the native land"], Ballata [Ballad], for tenor and piano | 31 December 1877 | SB75; unpub. |
| BV 71 | Cinq Pièces [Five Pieces] Op. 3, for piano | 1877 | ^{v} pub, fp |
| BV 72 | Andante con moto (in E minor) Op. 10, for clarinet and piano | 1877 | ^{v} SB79, pub |
| BV 73 | Menuetto (in D minor) Op. 4, for piano | 1 February 1878 | SB76; pub. |
| BV 74 | Toccata (in B♭ major) Op. 4, for piano | 17 February 1878 | SB77; unpub. |
| BV 75 | Studio [Study] in C minor Op. 12, for piano | Feb 1878 | SB80; unpub. |
| BV 76 | Adante ed Allegro vivace Op. 13, for string quartet | 23 February 1878 | SB81; unpub. |
| BV 77 | Menuetto (in F major) Op. 14, for piano | 26 February 1878 | MS, pub., ded. |
| BV 78 | Preludio e Fuga in C major Op. 15, for piano left hand | 27 February 1878 | SB82; unpub. |
| BV 79 | Fuga in stile libero [Fugue in free style] (in F minor) Op. 16, for piano | 5 March 1878 | SB83; unpub. |
| BV 80 | Concerto (in D minor) Op. 17, for piano and string quartet | 21 March 1878 | SB84, pub, instr, dur. |
| BV 81 | Suite campestre, 5 pezzi caratteristici [Pastoral suite, five character pieces] Op. 18, for piano | 1–5 April 1878 | SB85; pub. |
| BV 82 | "Pater noster" a tre voci ["Our Father" in three voices] Op. 20, (for soprano, alto, and baritone) | 6 April 1878 | SB86; unpub. |
| BV 83 | Piano piece in C major (untitled) | 5 May 1878 | SB87 (sketches); unpub. |
| BV 84 | Preludio in F minor Op. 19, for piano | 5 May 1878 | SB88; unpub. |
| BV 85 | Preludio e Fuga in C minor Op. 21, for piano | 13 May 1878 | MS, pub |
| BV 86 | Tristezza, "Dimmi perchè si pallido" (Heinrich Heine, trans. Vincenzo Baffi) [Sorrow, "Tell me why so pale"] Op. 22, for mezzo-soprano and piano | 18 May 1878 | SB89; unpub. |
| BV 87 | Antiphon, "Tota pulchra es Maria" ["Maria, you are completely beautiful"] Op. 23, for SATB | 13 June 1878 | SB90; unpub. |
| BV 88 | Suite Op. 10, for clarinet and piano | May–June 1878 | SB92; pub. |
| BV 89 | Gavotta Op. 25, for piano | 11 July 1878 | MS, pub. |
| BV 90 | Graduale delle Messe communi della Madonna, "Benedicta et venerabilis es" Op. 27 (Op. 15), for mezzo-soprano, SATB, and organ or piano | 30 July 1878 | SB93; unpub. |
| BV 91 | "Ave Maria," (Antiphon) Op. 2, for voice and piano | Aug 1878? | pub. C. A. Spina, Vienna, 1879? |
| BV 92 | Rhapsodie hongroise [Hungarian Rhapsody] Op. 28, for piano | 4–22 September 1878 | SB94 (frag); unpub. |
| BV 93 | "Salve Regina" Op. 29, (Antiphon) for contralto and piano | 30 September 1878 | SB95; unpub. |
| BV 94 | Lied der Klage [Song of Lamentation] Op. 38, "Die Luft ist trübe, der Wind weht kalt" (Otto von Kapf), ["The air is gray, the wind blows cold"] for alto voice and piano | 14 October 1878 | SB96; pub. August Cranz, Hamburg, 1879? |
| BV 95 | "Ave Maria" in the style of Palestrina Op. 11, (Antiphon) for SATB | 20 Act 1878 | SB97; unpub. |
| BV 96 | Piece for violin and piano Op. 70 (untitled) | Nov 1878 | MS: (lost), unpub. |
| BV 97 | Rondo brilliant, for piano | Nov 1878 | MS: (lost), unpub. |
| BV 98 | Des Sängers Fluch, "Es stand in alten Zeiten ein Schloß so hoch und hehr" (Ludwig Uhland) [The Singer's Curse, "There stood in ancient times, a castle so high and noble"] Op. 39, for alto voice and piano | Nov 1878 | pub. August Cranz, Hamburg, 1879?; ded. Doktor Albin von Vogel |
| BV 98a | Des Sängers Fluch, "Es stand in alten Zeiten ein Schloß so hoch und hehr" (Ludwig Uhland) [The Singer's Curse, "There stood in ancient times, a castle so high and noble"] Op. 39, for alto voice and orchestra | 13 April 1879 | SB104; unpub.; instr |
| BV 99 | Preludio e Fuga (in C minor) Op. 32, for 2 pianos | 5 December 1878 | SB98; unpub. |
| BV 100 | Racconti Fantastici. 3 Pezzi caratteristici [Fantastic Tales. 3 character pieces] Op. 12, for piano | 1878 or 1882? | pub., fp, ded. |

=== BV 101 to 200 ===
- Go to: BV 1 | BV 201 | Appendix

| Cat. no. | Title | Date(s) of composition | Details |
|---|---|---|---|
| BV 101 | Solo dramatique (in B♭ minor) Op. 13 (Op. 33), for clarinet and piano | 2 February 1879 | SB99; pub; fp |
| BV 102 | Menuetto (in F major) Op. 15 (Op. 25), for string quartet | 12 February 1879 | SB100; unpub. |
| BV 103 | Missa I [Mass I] Op. 34, for SATB | 12 February 1879 | SB101; unpub. |
| BV 104 | Capriccio (in G minor) Op. 36, for 2 pianos | 21 February 1879 | SB102; unpub. |
| BV 105 | "Benedicta et venerabilis es" (Gradual) Op. 16, for SAB | 1 April 1879 | SB103; unpub. |
| BV 106 | Scherzo (in C major) Op. 17, for piano | May 1879 | SB105^{JU}; unpub. |
| BV 107 | Andantino (in B♭ [major?]) Op. 41 (Op. 18), for clarinet and piano | 4 May 1879 | SB106^{JU}; pub |
| BV 108 | Serenade no. 2 (in B♭ [major?]) Op. 42 (Op. 19), for clarinet and piano | 4–31 May 1879 | SB107^{JU}; pub |
| BV 109 | Piece for piano duet (four hands) Op. 43 (untitled) | May 1879? | SB108^{JU}; unpub. |
| BV 110 | Concerto for piano and orchestra Op. 46 | May 1879 | SB109 (frag)^{JU}; unpub.; one movement |
| BV 111 | Scherzo Op. 47 (Op. 20), for string quartet | 31 May 1879 | SB110^{JU}; unpub. |
| BV 112 | Variationen über ein Minnesängerlied aus dem XIII. Jahrhundert [Variations on a 13th-century Minnesängerlied] Op. 48 (Op. 22), for piano and violin | 23 June 1879 | SB111^{JU}; unpub. |
| BV 113 | Sternenlied, "Es glänzt am Himmel Stern an Stern" (Oskar von Redwitz) [Star song, "It glitters in the heavens star upon star"] Op. 49 (Op. 23), for alto voice and piano | 26 June 1879 | MS:SB112^{JU}; unpub. |
| BV 114 | Albumvokale Op. 30, for voice and piano | 10 February 1884 | MS, pub.; dur. 15 min |
| BV 115 | Präludium und Fuge [Prelude and Fugue] in D minor Op. 51 (Op. 26) | 23 July 1879 | SB113^{JU}; unpub.; ded. Anna Weiß-Busoni |
| BV 116 | Novelette Op. 52 (Op. 27), for clarinet and piano | 2 August 1879 | SB114^{JU}; pub |
| BV 117 | Scherzo (in F♯ minor) Op. 53 (Op. 28) | 14 August 1879 | SB115^{JU}; unpub. |
| BV 118 | Scherzo in A minor Op. 54 (Op. 29) | 20 August 1879 | SB116^{JU}; unpub. |
| BV 119 | "Stabat Mater" Op. 55, (Sequence) for SSATBB and strings | Aug 1879 | SB117^{JU}; unpub.; fp; instr |
| BV 120 | Tragische Geschichte, "Es war einer, dem's zu Herzen ging" (Adelbert von Chamisso) [Tragic Stories, "There was one, who took it to heart"] Op. 56 (Op. 30), for low voice and piano | 2 October 1879 | SB118^{JU}; unpub.; arr. for TTBB, see BV 120a |
| BV 120a | Tragische Geschichte, "Es war einer, dem's zu Herzen ging" (Adelbert von Chamisso) [Tragic Stories, "There was one, who took it to heart"] Op. 56 (Op. 30), for TTBB (male chorus) | undated | SB202; unpub.; arr. of BV 120 |
| BV 121 | "Lieb Liebchen, leg's Händchen aufs Herze mein" (Heinrich Heine) ["Dear little dear one, lay your little hand upon my heart"] Op. 57 (Op. 31), for soprano and piano | 2? Oct 1879 | SB119^{JU}; unpub. |
| BV 122 | "Es fiel ein Reif in der Frühlingsnacht" (traditional Rheinland) ["Hoarfrost formed in the spring night"] Op. 59 (Op. 33), (song) for mezzo-soprano and piano | 13 October 1879 | SB120^{JU}; unpub. |
| BV 123 | Märchen [Fairy Tale] Op. 60 (Op. 34), for cello (or clarinet) and piano | Oct 1879 | SB121^{JU}; unpub. |
| BV 124 | Menuetto capriccioso [Capricious little menuet] in C major Op. 61, for piano | Oct 1879 | pub., fp, ded. |
| BV 125 | Introduzione e Capriccio, for 2 pianos | 23 November 1879 | MS: (lost); unpub. |
| BV 126 | Danze antiche [Ancient Dances] Op. 11, for piano | Dec 1879 | MS, pub., fp, ded. |
| BV 127 | "Kyrie" Op. 64, for SATB (a cappella); | 30 December 1879 | SB122^{JU}; unpub. |
| BV 128 | Ouverture (in E major), for piano four hands (fragment) | undated | SB125^{JU}; unpub.; arr. of BV 51? |
| BV 129 | Andante | undated | SB126^{JU}; unpub |
| BV 130 | Moderato (fragment) | undated | SB127^{JU}; unpub |
| BV 131 | Andante con moto (dietro l'antico stile [in the old style]) B♭ major | undated | SB128^{JU}; unpub. |
| BV 132 | Piano piece in B minor (untitled fragment) | undated | SB129^{JU}; unpub |
| BV 133 | Piano piece in D minor (untitled) | undated | SB130; unpub. |
| BV 134 | Andante e Tarantella (in C minor), for piano | undated | SB131; unpub. |
| BV 135 | String Quartet no. 3 (in F minor) | undated | SB132; unpub. |
| BV 136 | Allegretto (in D♭ major), for string quartet | undated | SB133; unpub. |
| BV 137 | Andante Sostenuto – Allegro Vivace (in C minor), for string quartet | undated | SB134 (frag); unpub. |
| BV 138 | Sonata in D major, for piano and clarinet | undated | SB135; unpub. |
| BV 139 | Novellett (Allegro vivace in C minor), for clarinet and piano | undated | SB136; unpub. |
| BV 140 | Piece (in B♭ major) for clarinet and piano (untitled) | undated | SB137 (frag); unpub. |
| BV 141 | Andante maestoso, for orchestra | undated | SB138 (frag); unpub. |
| BV 142 | "Non torna più", (song) for voice and piano | undated | SB139 (sketch, frag); unpub. |
| BV 143 | "Mein Herz gleicht dem Meere" (Heinrich Heine), (song) for voice and piano | undated | SB140; unpub. |
| BV 144 | "Espére enfant demain" (Victor Hugo), (song) for (soprano) voice and piano | 1880? | SB141; unpub. |
| BV 145 | Preghiera alla Madonna, "Vergin santa benedetta," for SATB | undated | SB142 (sketches, frag) |
| BV 146 | "Gloria", for SATB | 1 January 1880 | SB144; unpub. |
| BV 147 | Das Erkennen Op. 65, for voice and piano | 20 January 1880 | SB145 (sketches); unpub. |
| BV 148 | "Ave Maria" Op. 67, (Antiphon) for voice and strings | undated | SB146 (frag); unpub. |
| BV 149 | Praeludium [und] Fuge in D major a 3 voci, for piano | "30 February 1880" (sic) | SB148; unpub. |
| BV 150 | Marsch Op. 41, for piano | 5 March 1880 | MS: (lost); unpub. |
| BV 151 | Der Tanz: Walzer (in E♭ major), for piano | undated | SB149; unpub. |
| BV 152 | Gavotte in F minor Op. 70, for piano | 11 April 1880 | SB149; pub., fp, ded. |
| BV 153 | Invention (in E minor), for piano | 14 May 1880 | SB149; unpub. |
| BV 154 | Fugue in F major on a theme of W. A. Rémy, for piano | undated | SB149; unpub. |
| BV 155 | Preludio [und] Fuge (in C minor) Op. 75, for piano | May 1880 | SB155; unpub. |
| BV 156 | Duo (in E minor) Op. 43 (Op. 73), for 2 flutes and piano | Jun 1880 | SB151; pub. 1991 |
| BV 157 | Praeludium (Basso ostinato) und Fuge (Doppelfuge zum Choral) Op. 7 (Op. 76), for organ | 23 January 1880; 30 June 1880 | SB147; pub.; ded. Wilhelm Mayer |
| BV 158 | Rondo (in A major) Op. 77 (Op. 45), for piano | July 1880 | SB153; unpub. |
| BV 159 | Tre pezzi nello stile antico [Three pieces in ancient style] Op. 10, for piano | Jul 1880 | MS, pub.; fp, ded. |
| BV 160 | Scherzo (in C [major?]) Op. 47, for piano | Aug 1880 | MS: (lost); unpub. |
| BV 161 | Impromptu (in E minor) Op. 48, for clarinet and piano | Aug 1880 | SB154; unpub. |
| BV 162 | Piece (in A minor), for clarinet and piano (untitled) | undated | SB154; unpub. |
| BV 163 | Phantasiestück Op. 49, for piano | Aug 1880 | MS: (lost); unpub. |
| BV 164 | Sonate (in F minor) Op. 49 (Op. 50), for piano | 1 September 1880 | SB155; unpub. |
| BV 165 | Praeludium & Fuge in D major Op. 73, for piano | Oct 1880 | MS: (lost); unpub. |
| BV 166 | Praeludium [und] Fuge (in 4 voices) in G minor Op. 74, for piano | Oct 1880 | SB; unpub.; arr., see BV 220 |
| BV 167 | Zwei Lieder [Two Songs] Op. 31, for voice and piano | 12 October 1880 | MS, pub., ded. |
| BV 168 | Sonata for piano | Nov 1880 | MS: (lost); unpub. |
| BV 169 | Missa in honorem Beate Mariae Virginis Op. 51, for (a cappella) double chorus | Nov 1880 | SB161; unpub.; ded. Johannes B. Zwerger |
| BV 170 | Scherzo Op. 52, for violin, cello, and piano | Nov 1880 | MS: (lost); unpub. |
| BV 171 | Frühlingslied, "Ich grüße euch liebe Vögelein" (Otto von Kapff) Op. 44, for TTBB | Jun 1880? | SB159; unpub. |
| BV 172 | Der Wirtin Töchterlein, "Es zogen drei Burschen" (Ludwig Uhland) Op. 45 (Op. 53), for TTBB | Nov 1880 | SB160; unpub. |
| BV 173 | "Guten Abend, gute Nacht" (from Des Knaben Wunderhorn), for TTBB | Nov 1880? | SB; unpub. |
| BV 174 | Motet, "Gott erbarme sich unser" Op. 55, for chorus and piano | 15 November 1880 | SB162; unpub.; arr. as BV174a |
| BV 174a | Motet, "Gott erbarme sich unser" Op. 55, for chorus and orchestra | 23 December 1880 | SB163; unpub.; instr; arr. of BV 174 |
| BV 175 | Studio [Étude] in A minor, for piano | 1880? | SB166; unpub. |
| BV 176 | Suite (in G minor), for clarinet and string quartet | 1880? | SB167; unpub. |
| BV 177 | String Quartet no. 2 in C major Op. 56 | Jan–Feb 1881 and Dec 1881 – Jan 1882 | SB164; unpub. |
| BV 178 | Praeludium [und] Fuge, for piano | 1 April 1881 | SB (lost); unpub. |
| BV 179 | Praeludium [und] Fuge (in A minor), for piano | 1 April 1881 | SB; unpub. |
| BV 180 | Preludio e Fuga (for 4 voices in C major) Op. 36, for piano | 10 April 1881 | MS, pub, fp, ded. |
| BV 181 | 24 Préludes Op. 37, for piano (score) | May 1881 | MS, pub., fp; ded. Luigi Cimoso |
| BV 182 | Fuge in C [major?] Op. 72, for piano | 1881 | MS: (lost); unpub. |
| BV 183 | Requiem (Missa funebre) for soloists, chorus, and orchestra | 3 May – 10 July 1881 | SB171; unpub.; instr |
| BV 184 | Andante mit Variationen [Andante with Variations] (and Scherzo) Op. 18, for violin, cello, and piano | 1881 | SB172; unpub. |
| BV 185 | Una Festa di Villaggio, 6 pezzi caratteristici Op. 9, for piano | Dec 1881 | MS, pub., fp, ded. |
| BV 186 | Introduzione e Fuga sopra un Corale di G. S. Bach [Introduction and Fugue on a Chorale of J. S. Bach], for orchestra | 1881? | SB (frag); unpub.; instr |
| BV 187 | Notturno, for clarinet and piano | undated | SB173 (lost); unpub. |
| BV 188 | Fuga (in F major) Op. 57, per l'esame di Bologna, for piano | 27 March 1882 | SB174; unpub. |
| BV 189 | Danza Notturna [Nocturnal Dance] (in D major) Op. 13, for piano | 16 June 1882 | pub., fp |
| BV 190 | "Ave Maria" Op. 35, (Antiphon) for baritone and orchestra | 22–23 June 1882 | MS, pub., instr., ded. |
| BV 191 | Primavera, Estate, Autunno, Inverno (Le quattro stagione). 4 Poesie liriche Op. 40, for male voice soloists, male chorus, and orchestra (score) | Jul 1882 | MS, pub, instr, ded; arr., see BV 191a |
| BV 191a | Primavera. Frühling, for male chorus (TTBB) a cappella | undated | MS; unpub.; arr. of BV 191 (no. 1) |
| BV 192 | Il sabato del villagio (Giacomo Leopardi) [Saturday in the village], (cantata) for soloists, chorus, and orchestra | 5 August 1882 | MS (partial), unpub., instr, fp, ded |
| BV 193 | Marcia di Paesani e Contadine [Peasants' March] Op. 32, for piano | 4 August 1883 | MS, pub, fp |
| BV 194 | Macchiette medioevali [Medieval figures] Op. 33, for piano | 1882–1883 | pub., fp |
| BV 195 | Macchiette medioevali No. 2/B. Cavaliere Reiter, for piano | 1882–1883 | MS (sketches), unpub. |
| BV 196 | Serenata (in G minor) Op. 34, for cello and piano | 1 January 1883 | MS, pub., fp, ded |
| BV 197 | Trois Morceaux [Three Pieces] Op. 4, 5, and 6, for piano (score) | 1883? | pub, fp, ded |
| BV 198 | Etude 15, en forme d' "Adagio" d'une Sonate (in D♭ major), for piano | 1883 | MS, unpub., ded. |
| BV 199 | Etude 16 (Nocturne) (in B♭ minor), for piano | 1883 | MS: SB186; unpub. |
| BV 200 | Studio [Étude] 18 in F minor, for piano | 14 February 1883 | MS: SB184; unpub. |

=== BV 201 to 303 ===
- Go to: BV 1 | BV 101 | Appendix
- Note: This section is not yet complete. The "Details" column needs additional work.

| Cat. no. | Title | Date(s) of composition | Details |
|---|---|---|---|
| BV 201 | Symphonische Suite Op. 25, for orchestra | Aug 1883 | MS, pub., instr, fp, ded. |
| BV 202 | Zwei Lieder Op. 15, for voice and piano (score) (Aus den hebräischen Melodien von Lord Byron); No. 1 "Ich sah die Thräne" [I saw the tears] No. 2 "An Babylons Wassern" [By Babylon's Waters] | Mar 1884 | pub., ded., arr, see BV 202a |
| BV 202a | "An Babylons Wassern" (Byron), for male voice and piano | Feb 1901 | SB229^{JU} (frag); unpub.; arr. of BV 202 (no. 2) |
| BV 203 | Six études Op. 16, for piano (score) | 1883 | pub, ded (see §BV203d) |
| BV 204 | Sonata in F minor Op. 20, for piano | Christmas 1883 | SB187; pub, fp, ded |
| BV 205 | "So lang man jung" (Alice Worms) Op. 16, for male voice chorus and orchestra | Jan 1884 | unpub. |
| BV 206 | Étude en forme de variations Op. 17, for piano (score) | 1883? | pub. |
| BV 207 | Zwei altdeutsche Lieder Op. 18, for voice and piano | 1884? | pub.; arr. of no. 2, see BV 207a |
| BV 207a | "Unter den Linden" (song) for voice and small orchestra | 1893 | unpub., arr. of BV 207 |
| BV 208 | String Quartet in C (major) (No. 1), Op. 19 (score) | 1880–82 | pub. |
| BV 209 | Zweite Balletszene Op. 20, for piano | 1884 | pub. |
| BV 210 | Introduction et Scherzo, for piano and orchestra | Oct 1882, rev. Aug 1884 | unpub. |
| BV 211 | Gesang aus Mirza Schaffy, "Auf dem Dache stand sie, als ich schied" (Bodenstedt), for voice and piano | 1884 | unpub. |
| BV 212 | "Es blüht ein Blümlein", for TTBB | 17 January 1885 | MS: BSL (frag?); unpub. |
| BV 213 | Variationen und Fuge in freier Form über Fr. Chopin's C-moll Präludium (Op. 28 no. 20) Op. 22, for piano (score) | 1884 | pub. |
| BV 213a | Zehn Variationen über ein Präludium von Chopin, for piano (score) | 28 March 1922 | pub. |
| BV 214 | Invenzione (in D minor), for piano | 28 July 1885 | unpub. |
| BV 215 | Kleine Suite Op. 23, for cello and piano | 1886 | pub. |
| BV 216 | Zwei Lieder Op. 24, for low voice and piano | 1885 | pub. |
| BV 217 | Tempo di menuetto (in C major), for orchestra | 1885? | unpub. |
| BV 218 | Eine alte Geschichte in neue Reime gebracht, melodrama for voice and piano | undated, 1884 or 1885? | unpub. |
| BV 219 | Chorlied der Deutschen in Amerika, for TTBB | 1892? | unpub. |
| BV 220 | Praeludium [Prelude] in A minor, for piano | 1885? | unpub.; rev. from BV 166 |
| BV 221 | Introduktion, Marsch, Walzer, for orchestra | 1894? | MS: (frag, sketches); unpub. |
| BV 222 | Anhang zu Siegfried Ochs "Kommt a Vogerl g'flogen" (five variations), for piano | 1886? | pub. 1987 |
| BV 223 | Fughette, for violin and piano | 1886? | MS: (lost); unpub. |
| BV 224 | Kanon. Huldigung der Töne FBB, dargebracht den Tönen a Remi. | Mar 1887 | MS: lost; unpub. |
| BV 225 | String Quartet no. 2 in D minor Op. 26 (score) | Jun 1887 | pub. 1889 |
| BV 226 | Fuge über das Volkslied "O, du mein lieber Augustin", for piano duet | Jun 1888 | pub. 1985 |
| BV 227 | Finnländische Volksweisen Op. 27, for piano 4-hands (score) | 1888 | pub. 1889 |
| BV 228 | Piece (Étude in C major), for piano (untitled) | undated | MS: BSL; unpub. |
| BV 229 | Four Bagatelles Op. 28, for violin and piano | 1888 | pub. |
| BV 230 | Concert Fantasie Op. 29, for piano and orchestra | Dec 1888 – 1889 | MS: BSL; unpub.; rev. as BV 240 |
| BV 231 | Sigune, oder das stille Dorf. Opera in 2 acts and a prelude. | 1 February 1885 – Jun 1889 | MS: BSL; unpub. |
| BV 232 | Marche Funèbre, for (piano and) orchestra | undated | MS: BSL (frag); unpub. |
| BV 233 | Sonata I (in D♭ major), for piano | undated | MS: BSL (frag); unpub. |
| BV 234 | Sonata (no. 1 in E minor) Op. 29, for violin and piano (score) | 1889 | pub. 1891 |
| BV 235 | Zwei Klavierstücke [Two Pieces for Piano] Op. 30a | 1889 | pub. D. Rahter, Hamburg, 1891; rev. as BV 235a |
| BV 235a | Zwei Tanzstücke [Two Dance Pieces] Op. 30a, for piano (score) | 1914 | pub. B&H, 1914; rev. from BV 235 |
| BV 236 | Konzertstück [Concert Piece] Op. 31a, for piano and orchestra (score) | 1889 – Jun 1890 | pub.; dur. 20 min; instr; fp; ded. Anton Rubinstein |
| BV 237 | Kultaselle. Zehn kurze Variationen über ein finnisches Volkslied [Ten short variations on a Finnish Folk Song], for piano and cello | May 1889? | pub. Rudolf Dietrich, Leipzig, and B&H, 1891, 1951? |
| BV 238 | Vierte Ballet-Scene in Form eines Concert-Walzers [Fourth Ballet Scene in the Form of a Concert Waltz] Op. 33a, for piano (score) | Jun 1894 | pub. B&H, 1894; ded. Carl Stasny; rev., see BV 238a |
| BV 238a | Vierte Ballet Szene (Walzer und Galopp) [Fourth Ballet Scene (Waltz and Gallop)], for piano (score) | 16 February 1913 | pub. B&H, 1913; fp; ded. Carl Stasny; rev. from BV 238 |
| BV 239 | 5^{e} Scéne de Ballet [5th Ballet Scene], (in A minor) for piano | undated, after 1892? | SB (frag); unpub. |
| BV 240 | Symphonisches Tongedicht [Symphonic Tone Poem], Op. 31a | 1 March 1893 | pub. B&H, 1894; instr; ded. Arthur Nikisch |
| BV 241 | [6] Stücke [Pieces] Op. 33b, for piano (score): 1. Schwermut [Melancholy]; 2. Frohsinn [Gaiety]; 3. Scherzino [Little Scherzo]; 4. Fantasia in modo antico [Fantasia in antique style]; 5. Finnische Ballade; 6. Exeunt omnes [Everyone exits] | 1895 | MS, pub, ded |
| BV 242 | Geharnischte Suite [Armored Suite] Op. 34a, for orchestra (Second Orchestral Suite) (score): 1. Vorspiel [Introduction]; 2. Kriegstanz [Warrior Dance]; 3. Grabdenkmal [Funeral Monument]; 4. Ansturm [Assault] | 1894–5; rev. 1903 | pub. B&H, 1905 |
| BV 243 | Violin Concerto in D major, Op. 35a (score) | 1896 – Mar 1897 | pub. B&H, 1899; dur. 28 min; instr; fp; ded. Henri Petri |
| BV 244 | Sonata no.2 (in E minor) Op. 36a, for violin and piano (score) | May 1898 and Aug 1900 | SB; pub. B&H, 1901 EB 5189; dur. 32 min; fp; ded. Ottokar Nováček |
| BV 245 | Eine Lustspielouvertüre (Comedy Overture) Op. 38, for orchestra (score) | July 1897; rev. 1904 | pub. B&H, 1904; dur. 8 min |
| BV 246 | Ballade (in D♭ major), for piano | undated | SB224 (sketches); unpub. |
| BV 247 | Piano Concerto in C major, Op. 39 (score) | 1901 – 3 August 1904 | MS, pub, instr, fp |
| BV 247a | Coda supplementaria for Piano Concerto | 13 August 1908 | MS; unpub. |
| BV 248 | Turandot Suite Op. 41, for orchestra (score): 1. The Execution, the City Gate and the Departure; 2. Truffaldino's March; 3. Altoum's March; 4. Turandot's March; 5. Turandot's Frauengemach [Chamber]; 6. Tanz und Gesang [Dance and Song]; 7. Nächtlicher Walzer [Night Waltz]; 8. Marcia funebre e Finale alla Turca | Jun–Aug 1905 | pub. B&H, 1906 PB 1976; dur. 33 min; instr; fp; ded. Karl Muck |
| BV 248a | Verzweiflung und Ergebung [Despair and Resignation]: appendix to the Turandot Suite (score) | 1911 | pub. B&H, 1911 PB 2309; dur. 4 min; instr; fp |
| BV 248b | Altoums Warnung [Altoum's Warning]: second appendix to the Turandot Suite (replaces the Marcia funebre). | 1917 | pub. B&H, 1918 PB 1976a; dur. 6 min (inc. Finale alla Turca); instr; fp |
| BV 249 | Elegien. 6 neue Klavierstücke. (score) [Elegies. 6 new piano pieces]: 1. "Nach der Wendung" (Recueillement); 2. "All'Italia!" (in modo napolitano); 3. "Meine Seele bangt und hofft zu Dir" (Choralvorspiel); 4. "Turandots Frauengemach" (Intermezzo); 5. "Die Nächtlichen" (Walzer); 6. "Erscheinung" (Notturno) | Sep–Dec 1907 | MS, pub, fp |
| BV 250 | Introduction music for "Das Wunder des Heiligen Antonius: Der Leichenschmaus" ["The Miracle of Saint Anthony: The Funeral Feast"] | 1908–1911 | MS: (sketches); unpub. |
| BV 251 | Nuit de Noël. Esquisse [Christmas. Sketch], for piano (score) | Dec 1908 | SB; pub. Durand et Fils, Paris, 1909; dur. 4 min; ded. Frida Kindler |
| BV 252 | Berceuse (Lullaby), for piano (score) | 5 June 1909 | pub. |
| BV 252a | Berceuse élégiaque Op. 42, for orchestra (score) | 27 October 1909 | pub. |
| BV 253 | Fantasia nach Johann Sebastian Bach, for piano (score) | 8 June 1909 | pub. |
| BV 254 | An die Jugend. Eine folge von Klavierstücken (score) [To Youth. A sequence of piano pieces]: 1. Preludietto, Fughetta ed Esercizio; 2. Preludio, Fuga e Fuga figurata: Studie nach Bach; 3. Giga, Bolero e Variazione: Studie nach Mozart; 4. Introduzione, Capriccio (Paganinesco) & Epilogo | Jul–Aug 1909 | MS, pub, ded, fp |
| BV 255 | Große Fuge [Great Fugue], for piano | January – 1 Mar 1910 | pub. |
| BV 256 | Fantasia Contrappuntistica. Edizione definitiva, for piano (score) | Jun 1910 | pub. |
| BV 256a | Fantasia Contrappuntistica. Edizione minore, for piano (score) | 20 July 1912 | pub. |
| BV 256b | Fantasia Contrappuntistica, for 2 pianos (score) | 3 July 1921 | pub. |
| BV 257 | Sonatina (No. 1), for piano (score) | 4 August 1910 | |
| BV 258 | Die Brautwahl (opera) | 2 February 1906 – 8 October 1911 | pub. |
| BV 259 | Sonatina seconda, for piano (score) | 6 July 1912 | pub. |
| BV 260 | Operetten Musik (Incidental Music), for Wedekind's Franziska | 1912 | SB260 (sketches); unpub. |
| BV 261 | Die Brautwahl Suite Op. 45, for orchestra (score): 1. Spukhaftes Stück [Ghostly Music]; 2. Lyrisches Stück [Lyrical Music]; 3. Mystisches Stück [Mystic Music]; 4. Hebräisches Stück [Hebrew Music]; 5. Heiteres Stück [Joyous Music] | Aug 1912 | pub. |
| BV 262 | Nocturne symphonique Op. 43, for orchestra | Oct 1912 – 6 July 1913 | pub. |
| BV 263 | Su monte Mario, "Solenni in vetta a Monte Mario" (Giosuè Carducci), (song) for baritone and orchestra | 18 August 1914 | SB (frag); unpub. |
| BV 264 | Indianische Fantasie [Indian Fantasy] Op. 44, for piano and orchestra (score) | Apr 1913 – 22 February 1914 | pub. |
| BV 265 | Floh-Sprung. Canon for two voices with obbligato bass | 21 August 1914 | pub. 1932 |
| BV 266 | Rondò arlecchinesco Op. 46, for orchestra and tenor solo (score) | April – 8 Jun 1915 | MS: Library of Congress, Washington, and SB; pub. B&H, 1917 |
| BV 267 | Indianisches Tagebuch. Erstes Buch. [Indian Diary. First Book], for piano (score) | June – 8 Aug 1915 | pub. |
| BV 268 | Sonatina (no. 3) "ad usum infantis," for piano (score) | Jul 1915 | pub. |
| BV 269 | Gesang vom Reigen der Geister [Song of Dancing of the Spirits]. Indianisches Tagebuch. Zweites Buch. [Indian Diary. Second Book] Op. 47, for small orchestra | August – 30 Dec 1915 | pub. |
| BV 270 | Arlecchino (opera) Op. 50 (score) | Nov -Dec 1914; Nov 1915 – Aug 1916 | pub. |
| BV 271 | Improvisation über das Bachsche Chorallied "Wie wohl ist mir, o Freund der Seele" [Improvisation on the Bach chorale "How good I feel, O friend of the soul"], for 2 pianos (score) | – 26 June Aug 1916 | pub. |
| BV 272 | Albumblatt [Albumleaf] (in E minor), for flute (or muted violin) and piano | 1916 | SB; pub. B&H, 1917; ded. Albert Biolley; arr. for piano, see BV272a, |
| BV 272a | Albumblatt [Albumleaf] (in E minor), for piano | 1917 | pub. B&H, 1918; ded. Albert Biolley; arr. from BV 272 |
| BV 273 | Turandot (opera). Eine chinesische Fabel nach Gozzi in zwei Akten. [A Chinese fable after Gozzi in two acts.] | Dec 1916 – Mar 1917 | pub. B&H, 1918 (vocal score only); ded. Arturo Toscanini |
| BV 274 | Sonatina (no. 4) "in diem nativitatis Christi MCMXVII" for piano (score) | 22 December 1917 | ms, pub, ded, fp (see §BV274d) |
| BV 275 | Sonatina quasi Sonata for piano | 1917 | MS: (sketches) |
| BV 276 | Concertino Op. 48, for clarinet and small orchestra (score) | Mar–Apr 1918 | pub. B&H, 1918; dur. 10 min; fp; instr; arr.; ded. Edmondo Allegra |
| BV 277 | Altoums Gebet. "Konfutse, dir hab' ich geschworen" (Ferruccio Busoni) [Altoum's Prayer. "Confucius, to you have I sworn."] Op. 49 no. 1, for baritone and small orchestra | 1917 | pub. B&H, 1919; ded. Augustus Milner |
| BV 278 | Lied des Mephistopheles. "Es war einmal ein König" (Johann Wolfgang von Goethe, from Faust) [Mephistopheles' Song. "Once upon a time there was a king"] (from Goethe's drama Faust), Op. 49 no. 2, for baritone and small orchestra | 30 March 1918 | SB; pub. B&H, 1919; ded. Augustus Milner; arr. from BV278a |
| BV 278a | Lied des Mephistopheles. "Es war einmal ein König" (Johann Wolfgang von Goethe, from Faust) [Mephistopheles' Song. "Once upon a time there was a king"] (from Goethe's drama Faust), Op. 49 no. 2, for baritone and piano | Mar 1918 or later? | SB; pub. B&H, 1919; ded. Augustus Milner; arr. baritone and small orchestra, see BV 278 |
| BV 279 | Notturni [Nocturnes] (in A minor). Prologo, for piano | 20 May 1918 | SB; unpub.; ded. Riccardo Hadl |
| BV 280 | Sonatina brevis (no. 5), "In Signo Joannis Sebastiani Magni," for piano (score) | 19 August 1918 | SB; pub. B&H, 1919; ded. Philipp Jarnach |
| BV 281 | Lied des Unmuts. "Keinen Reimer wird man finden" (Johann Wolfgang von Goethe, from West-östlicher Diwan) [Song of ill humor. "Not a rhymer does one find"], for baritone and piano | May 1918? | SB; pub. B&H, 1919; ded. Augustus Milner; arr. for baritone and orchestra, see BV 281a |
| BV 281a | Lied des Unmuts. "Keinen Reimer wird man finden" (Johann Wolfgang von Goethe, from West-östlicher Diwan) [Song of ill humor. "Not a rhymer does one find"], for baritone and orchestra | 20 February 1924 | SB; pub. B&H, Wiesbaden, 1964; ded. Augustus Milner; arr. from BV 281 |
| BV 282 | Sarabande und Cortège Op. 51. Two studies for Doktor Faust, [Fifth and Sixth Elegies for Orchestra] (score) | Dec 1918 – Jan 1919 | pub. B&H, 1920 |
| BV 283 | Eldorado. "Gaily bedight, A gallant knight" (Edgar Allan Poe), (song) for voice and piano | 10 June 1919 | SB (sketches); unpub. |
| BV 284 | Kammer-Fantasie über Carmen [Chamber Fantasy after Carmen] (Sonatina no. 6), for piano (score) | 20 March 1920 | SB; pub. B&H, 1920; ded. Leonhard Tauber |
| BV 285 | Divertimento Op. 52, for flute and small orchestra (score) | May 1920 | SB; pub. B&H, 1922; ded. Philippe Gaubert |
| BV 286 | Elegie (in E♭ major), for clarinet and piano (score) | Sep 1919 and Jan 1920 | SB (sketch); pub. B&H, 1921; ded. Edmondo Allegra |
| BV 287 | Toccata: Preludio, Fantasia, and Ciaccona, for piano (score) | 21 July – Sep 1920 | MS; pub.; ded. Isidor Philipp |
| BV 288 | Tanzwalzer Op. 53, for orchestra (score) | Sep – Oct 1920 | pub. B&H, 1922; dur. 12 min; fp; instr; ded. the memory of Johann Strauss |
| BV 289 | Drei Albumblätter [Three Albumleaves], for piano (score) | May 1921 | pub. B&H, 1921; dur. 8 min; fp; ded. |
| BV 290 | Romanza e scherzoso Op. 54, for piano and orchestra | 21 June 1921 | SB; pub. B&H, 1922, PB 2639; dur. 8 min; fp; instr; ded. Alfredo Casella; see BV 292 |
| BV 291a | Die Bekehrte, "Bei dem Glanze der Abendröte" (Johann Wolfgang von Goethe) [The Convert, "By the radiance of the afterglow"], (song) for female voice and piano | 22 September 1921 | MS: Library of Congress, Washington; pub. B&H, 1937, DLV 4791; dur. 4 min; ded. Lola Artôt de Padilla |
| BV 291b | Die Spröde, "An dem reinsten Frühlingsmorgen" (Johann Wolfgang von Goethe) [The Prude, "On the clearest spring morning"], (song) for female voice and piano | Sep 1921 | MS: University of Tennessee, Knoxville (frag, sketches); unpub. |
| BV 292 | Concertino Op. 54, for piano and orchestra | 21 June 1921 | pub. B&H, 1937 (BV 236 followed by BV 290); fp |
| BV 293 | Perpetuum mobile, 'nach des Concertino II. Satz Op. 54' (Perpetuum mobile, after the second movement of the Concertino Op. 54), for piano (score) | Feb 1922 | pub. B&H, 1922, EB 5231, plate number 28765; dur. 3 min; ded. Cella Delavrancea |
| BV 294 | Grausige Geschichte vom Münzjuden Lippold. Aus der Oper Die Brautwahl [Gruesome Tale of Lippold, the Jew-coiner. From the opera The Bridal Choice], for voice (baritone) and orchestra | 16 February – Mar 1923 | SB; unpub.; dur. 6 min; instr; arr. baritone and piano, see BV 294a |
| BV 294a | Grausige Geschichte vom Münzjuden Lippold. Aus der Oper Die Brautwahl [Gruesome Tale of Lippold, the Jew-coiner. From the opera The Bridal Choice], for voice (baritone) and piano | 30 March 1923 | SB; unpub.; dur. 6 min; arr. of BV 294 |
| BV 295 | Zigeunerlied [Gypsy Song] Op. 55 no. 2, "Im Nebelgeriesel, im tiefen Schnee" (Johann Wolfgang von Goethe) [In the misty drizzle, in the deep snow], for baritone and orchestra | 27 March 1923 | SB; pub. B&H; dur. 8 min; fp; instr; arr. baritone and piano, see BV 295a |
| BV 295a | Zigeunerlied [Gypsy Song] Op. 55 no. 2, "Im Nebelgeriesel, im tiefen Schnee" (Johann Wolfgang von Goethe) [In the misty drizzle, in the deep snow], for baritone and piano | Mar 1923 | pub.; arr. of BV 295 |
| BV 296 | Fünf kurze Stücke zur Pflege des polyphonen Spiels auf dem Pianoforte. [Five short pieces for the cultivation of polyphonic playing on the piano.] | – 19 March May 1923 | MS; pub.; fp; dur. 16 min; ded. Edwin Fischer |
| BV 297 | Prélude et Étude en Arpèges [Prelude and Etude in Arpeggios], for piano (score) | 29 January and 12 February 1923 | MS; pub.; dur. 7 min; fp |
| BV 298 | Schlechter Trost, "Mitternachts weint' und schluchzt' ich" (Johann Wolfgang von Goethe) [Poor Comfort, "At midnight I cried and sobbed"], (song) for baritone and orchestra | 24 February 1924 | SB; pub.; dur. 3 min; fp; instr; arr. baritone and piano, see BV 298a |
| BV 298a | Schlechter Trost, "Mitternachts weint' und schluchzt' ich" (Johann Wolfgang von Goethe) [Poor Comfort, "At midnight I cried and sobbed"], (song) for baritone and piano | Feb 1924 | pub.; arr. from BV 298a |
| BV 299 | Lied des Brander, "Es war eine Ratt' im Kellernest" (Johann Wolfgang von Goethe, from Faust) [Brander's Song, "There was a rat in the basement nest"], for baritone and piano | Mar 1918 | SB (incomplete); pub.; dur. 2 min; arr. |
| BV 300 | "Es war ein König in Thule" (Johann Wolfgang von Goethe) ["There was a king in Thule"], (song) for baritone and piano | 1918 | SB (sketches); unpub. |
| BV 301 | "Wie an dem Tag, der dich der Welt verliehen" (Johann Wolfgang von Goethe) ["How on the day, which bestowed thee upon the world"], (song) for voice and piano | 1918 | SB (sketches); unpub. |
| BV 302 | "Freudvoll und leidvoll" (Johann Wolfgang von Goethe) [Joyful and sorrowful], (song) for voice and piano | 1918 | SB (sketches); unpub. |
| BV 303 | Doktor Faust (opera) | Sep 1916 – May 1923 (unfinished) | pub. B&H |

=== Appendix ===
- Go to: BV 1 | BV 101 | BV 201

This section lists additional original works not assigned numbers in the Kindermann catalog. They are listed in the order given in Roberge (pp. 45–46) with one additional item (no. 9).

| No. | Title | Date(s) of composition | Details |
|---|---|---|---|
| 1 | Overtüre zu einem gedachten Singspiel nach der Tradition des "Lieben Augustin", for orchestra [Overture for an intended Singspiel based on the "Lieber Augustin" Tradition] | undated; ca. 1888 | MS: SB207 (sketch); unpub. |
| 2 | (Incidental) Music for Gozzi's "Turandot," for orchestra and female voices | Jun 1905 | MS (lost); unpub.; fp; arr. |
| 3 | Klavierübung in fünf Teilen [Piano tutorial in five parts] (First Edition) | 1917–1922 | MS, pub, ded |
| 4 | Nachtrag zu Turandot – "Diese Zeichen von Trauer" [Addenda to Turandot – "These signs of mourning"] | 22 June 1921 | SB; unpub. |
| 5 | Reminiscenza Rossiniana, "Caro Dent due paroline in confidenza" (Ferruccio Busoni) ["My dear Dent, two small words in confidence"], for voice and piano | 3 March 1923 | pub. Dent, pp. 278–9. |
| 6 | Marsch der Schieber am Kurfürstendamm, "Wir schieben, wir schieben" (Ferruccio Busoni) [Song of the Profiteers on Kurfürstendamm, "We profiteer, we profiteer"], for unison choir and piano | 20 April 1923 | SB, unpub. |
| 7 | Klavierübung in zehn Büchern, zweite umgestaltete und bereicherte Ausgabe. [Piano tutorial in ten books, second reorganized and enriched edition.] | Dec 1923 – Jan 1924 | MS, pub |
| 8 | "Ich hab' gesucht und nichts gefunden" (Ferruccio Busoni) ["I have searched and found nothing"], for SSA | 14 January 1924 | MS, pub., ded. |
| 9 | (Six miniature etudes for piano, the last one incomplete) (untitled) | undated | SB165; unpub. |

== Catalog details ==
This section contains detailed information for selected catalog items.

^ BV 42: String quartet no. 2 (in F minor)
Comprises: four movements
I. Allegro Agitato
II. Andante Sostenuto
III. Scherzo – Trio
IV. Allegro Vivace
MS: SB53 (4 pages score)
Title: 2º Quartetto composto da Ferruccio Benvenuto Busoni
Ded: Al mio amatissimo padre (Ferdinando Busoni).
Date: Scritto il 28 Aprile 1876 (at the end of the 1st movement).
Pub: unpublished
Ref: Kindermann, pp. 43–44; Roberge, p. 11; Beaumont, p. 357.

^ BV 45: Il Dolore: Romanza senza parole [Sorrow: Romance without words] (in A minor), for piano
Tempo: Andante
MS: SB40 (6 pages score)
Ded: Alla Memoria dell' Illustrissimo Signor Barone Hermann de Todesco.
Date: Composta il 21 Giugno 1876 all'età di anni 10 in Gmunden.
MS: SB N. Mus. ms. 120 (copy of SB40)
Title: Der Schmerz. Lied ohne Worte für Klavier allein, componirt von dem 10jährigen Ferruccio Benvenuto Busoni.
Ded: Zur Erinnerung an den Herrn Baron Hermann von Todesco.
Date: Scritta il 21 Giugno 1876 all'età di anni 10.
Ref: Kindermann, pp. 45–46; Roberge, p. 11; Beaumont, p. 357; Sitsky, pp. 13, 364, 380.

^ BV 48: Gavottina (in F major) Op. 3 no. 3, for piano
MS: SB55 (2 pages); SB56 "Gavotta" is identical to SB55.
Date: Scritta l'11 Novembre 1876 all'età di anni 10 e mezzo a Vienna.
Note: This piece was probably intended for BV 71 (Beaumont).
Ref: Kindermann, p. 47; Beaumont, p. 358; Sitsky, p. 364.

^ BV 51 Ouverture (in E major), for (large) orchestra (unfinished)
Tempi: Moderato – Allegro
MS: SB58 (title page, 25 pages score) (fragment)
Title: Ouverture per Grande Orchestra composta da Ferr. Weiß-Busoni
Date: Composta nell'anno 1876 in Vienna.
Instrumentation: 2 flutes, 2 oboes, 2 clarinets, 2 bassoons; 2 horns, 2 trumpets, 2 trombones, bass trombone; timpani, tubular bells, harp; strings
Pub: unpublished
Arrangement: piano duet, see BV 128
Ref: Kindermann, pp. 48–49; Roberge, p. 12; Beaumont, p. 357.

^ BV 57: Sonata (No. 4 in F minor)? (unfinished)
Alternative titles:
1) Zwei Kompositionen in d-Moll und f-Moll für Pianoforte (Kindermann)
2) Two Pieces in D minor and F minor for Piano (fragments) (Roberge)
3) 2 pieces Op. 6, for piano (Beaumont)
4) Sonata fragment Op. 6 (Sitsky)
MS: SB78
Comprises:
1) Titlepage: "Op. 6"
2) Piece in D minor (3 pages, fragment)
3) Piece in F minor (5 pages, fragment)
Notes:
1) On the last page of (3) is written: "Sonata 4ª"
2) On the first page of (3) are listed:
Iª Sonata Do magg: [probably BV 58
IIª Sonata Re magg: [probably BV 61]
IIIª Sonata Mi magg: [probably BV 65]
IVª Sonata Fa min: [probably this work, BV 57]
Vª Sonata [to] IXª Sonata [all without indication of key]
This list probably refers to an intended set of sonatas which was never completed. (Kindermann, Sitsky)
Ref: Kindermann, pp. 51–52; Sitsky, pp. 23–24; Roberge, p. 12; Beaumont, p. 358.

^ BV 58: Sonata No. 1 in C major Op. 7, for piano
MS: ' SB64 (Title page; 1 blank page; no.1: 3 pages; 2 blank pages; nos. 2–4: 6 pages; 2 blank pages)
Comprises:
1) Allegro con brio
2) Andante mosso
3) (Menuet) – Trio
4) (no tempo marking; 2/4)
Title: Sonata No. 1 in Do magg: Op. 7 Composta da Ferruccio Benvenuto Busoni
Date: il 20 Maggio 1877 all' età di anni undici e 2 mesi in tempo sua malattia
Note: This sonata was probably intended to be part of a set of at least 9 sonatas, never completed (see BV 57).
Ref: Kindermann, pp. 52–53; Sitsky, pp. 23–24; Roberge, p. 12; Beaumont, p. 358.

^ BV 61: Sonata No. 2 in D major Op. 8, for piano
MS: SB67 (Title page; 21 pages score; 1 blank page)
Comprises:
1) Allegro con fuoco
2) Andante con Variazione: Andante con moto quasi Andantino
3) Andante – Allegro Vivace
Title: Sonata No. 2 in Re magg: Composta per il pianoforte. Op. 8 da Ferruccio Benvenuto Busoni
Date: il 5 Luglio 1877 in Gmunden all' età di anni 11.
Note:
1) This sonata was probably intended to be part of a set of at least 9 sonatas, never completed (see BV 57).
2) BV 62 may originally have been intended to be part of this sonata (Beaumont).
Ref: Kindermann, pp. 54–55; Sitsky, pp. 23–24; Roberge, p. 12; Beaumont, p. 358.

^ BV 62: Scherzo (in F♯ minor), for piano
Tempo: Presto
MS: G. Ricordi, Milan
Title: Scherzo, tratto dalla Sonata Op. 8 in Mi magg: composto da Ferruccio Benv. Busoni
[Scherzo from the Sonata Op. 8 in E major, composed by Ferruccio Benvenuto Busoni]
Ded: All'Illustre Critico Sigr. Filippo Dr. Filippi.
Date: Gmunden, (Austr. Sup.) Luglio 1877
Pub: F. Lucca, Milan, 1882, plate. no. Z 35468 Z, (5 pages)
Title: Scherzo per pianoforte tratto dalla Sonata Op. 8 in Mi Maggiore
Ded: All'Illustre Critico Cavaliere Filippo Dott^{r}. Filippi.
Notes:
1) Scherzo movement probably originally intended for the Sonata No. 3 in E major Op. 9, BV 65 (Sitsky); or the Sonata No. 2 in D major Op. 8, BV 61 (Beaumont).
2) According to Busoni's handwritten catalog of works (ca. 1881) the piece was composed on 5 July 1877.
3) Publication was announced on 16 September 1882 in L'Arte, Trieste.
Ref: Kindermann, pp. 55–56; Sitsky, p. 41; Beaumont, p. 358.

^ BV 64: Preludio (in E minor), for piano
Tempo: Andante sostenuto
MS: SB68 (1 page)
Title: Preludio
Date: Gmunden den 4 September 1877 (at the end of the composition).
Text: "Du bist wie eine Blume" (Heinrich Heine) ["You are like a flower"]
Note: The text by Heine appears in the piano part rather than the title.
Ref: Kindermann, p. 57; Roberge, p. 13; Beaumont, p. 358; Sitsky, p. 365.

^ BV 65: Sonata No. 3 in E major Op. 9, for piano (unfinished)
MS: SB69
Title: Sonata No. 3 in Mi magg: Op. 9
Comprises:
1) (no tempo marking; E major; 4/4; 8 pages)
2) one intervening title page: Sonata Nº 3 Mi maggiore
3) Finale (E major; 6/8; sketch, 6 pages)
Date: Composta il 14 September 1877 (at the end of the composition).
Notes:
1) BV 62 was probably originally to be part of this sonata (Sitsky).
2) This sonata was probably intended to be part of a set of at least 9 sonatas, never completed (see BV 57).
Ref: Kindermann, pp. 57–58; Roberge, p. 13; Beaumont, p. 358; Sitsky, pp. 41, 365.

^ BV 67: "Ave Maria," (Antiphon) Op. 1, for voice and piano
MS: unknown
Comp: 1 October 1977 (set Note 1)
Pub: Vienna: C. A. Spina and Hamburg: August Cranz, n.d. [1878 (Dent)], plate no. C.24586, (5 pages)
Title: Ave Maria per Canto accompagnamento dir Pianoforte, Op. 1
Ded: Omaggio al celebre Tenore Cav. Angelo Masini
Notes:
1) Date of composition for this work is written on the first page of ms SB360 (BV 50): "Ave Maria 1/10/77"
2) According to Busoni's handwritten catalog of works (ca. 1881) the piece was composed in 1877 in Gmunden.
Ref: Kindermann, pp. 58–59; Dent, p. 345; Roberge, p. 13; Beaumont, p. 358.

^ BV 71: Cinq Pièces [Five Pieces] Op. 3, for piano
Comprises:
1) Preludio: Andante
2) Minuetto – Trio
3) Gavotta – Trio
4) Etude: Allegretto con moto
5) Gigue: Allegro
Comp: 1877
MS: unknown
Pub: Leipzig: August Cranz, n.d. [1877 (Dent)], plate nos. C.24541 to C.24545, (3, 5, 5, 5, and 7 pages)
First performance: Vienna and Baden, 1878; Ferruccio Busoni, piano
Notes:
1) According to Busoni's handwritten catalog of works (ca. 1881) this piece was composed in 1877 in Vienna.
2) This is Busoni's first published work.
Ref: Dent, p. 340; Kindermann, pp. 61–63; Roberge, p. 13; Beaumont, p. 358; Sitsky, pp. 40–41.

^ BV 72: Andante con moto (in E minor) Op. 10, for clarinet and piano
Alternative titles:
1) Komposition in e-Moll für Klarinette und Pianoforte (Kindermann)
2) Suite in E minor for Clarinet and Piano (Roberge)
3) Suite Op. 10, for clarinet and piano (Beaumont)
Comprises: Andante con moto (in E minor) (4/4, 80 bars) (one movement only)
MS: SB79
Page inventory:
Full score: Title page; 3 pages score (clarinet in C; piano); 1 blank page; 2 pages score
Clarinet part in C: both sides of a single sheet
Title: Klarinetten-Suite, Op. 10
Date: 1877.
Pub: Munich: G. Henle Verlag, 1992; cat. no. HN 467; ed. by Georg Meerwein
Title: Andante con moto
Full score: pp. 1–3 (clarinet in C; piano)
Clarinet part: p. 1 (in B♭); p. 18 (in C).
Note: Between measures 40 and 41 the full score and the clarinet part of the manuscript have an additional 14 bars not included in the published score. These were later stricken from the ms full score. The clarinet part notates this section in "two-part texture." (Meerwein)
Ref: Meerwein, Full score: pp. vi–vii (Preface), 53 (Comments); Kindermann, p. 63; Beaumont, p. 359; Roberge, p. 13; Sitsky, p. 365.

^ BV 203: Six études Op. 16, for piano
Comprises:
Etüde 1. Allegro deciso
Etüde 2. Allegro moderato
Etüde 3. Moderato
Etüde 4. Allegro vivace e con fuoco
Etüde 5. (Fuga.) Allegro giusto
Etüde 6. Scherzo. Vivacissimo, energico, feroce
Comp: 1883 (B.)
Manuscript: Unknown
Publications:
1) Vienna: Albert J. Gutmann, n.d. [1883 (D.)], cat. no. A.J.G. 614, plate no. 8285, (29 pages)
2) No. 5 only: Vienna: Albert J. Gutmann, Copyright 1884 by G. Schirmer, New York, cat. no. 530, (8 pages)
3) Leipzig: Breitkopf & Härtel, Copyright 1886 by G. Schirmer, New York, cat. no. EB 5079, plate no. 28468 (29 pages)
4) No. 5 only: [Leipzig: Breitkopf & Härtel], Copyright 1886 by G. Schirmer, New York, plate no. A.J.G. 530, (8 pages)
5) Reprint: Wiesbaden-Leipzig-Paris: Breitkopf & Härtel, n.d. [1950? or later], cat. no. 5079, plate no. 28468, (29 pages)
6) Nos. 2–4: Moscow: Muzyka, 1969, ed. Grigorii Kogan (R.)
Dedication: Johannes Brahms
First performances:
1) Graz, 21 October 1883; (no. 5 only); Ferruccio Busoni, piano. (R.)
2) Vienna, 1884; (only 2 of the 6); Ferruccio Busoni, piano (D.)
Ref: Dent, pp. 46, 341; Kindermann, pp. 163–165; Sitsky, p. 47; Beaumont, p. 365; Roberge, p. 26.

BV 204: Sonate f-moll Op. 20 für Klavier [Sonata in F minor, Op. 20, for piano]
Comprises:
1) Allegro risoluto vivace ed energico
2) Andante con moto
3) Nella guesa d'un'improvvisazione – Allegro fugato
Manuscript: SB187 (Sonate Op. 20)
Dedication: Anton Rubinstein gewidmet
Dated: Vienna Natale 1883 [Vienna, Christmas, 1883] (at the end of the manuscript)
First performance: Vienna, Bösendorfer Saal, 6 March 1884; Ferruccio Busoni, piano
Publication: B&H, 1983, as Op. 20a, ed. Jutta Theurich
Recording: Wolf Harden, piano (Naxos 8572077)
Ref: Dent, p. 341; Kindermann. pp. 165–166; Sitsky, p. 26; Beaumont, p. 365; Roberge, p. 26.

BV 241: [6] Stücke [Pieces] Op. 33b, for piano
Comprises:
Series I (ded. Max Reger):
1) Schwermut [Melancholy]
2) Frohsinn [Gaiety],
3) Scherzino [Little Scherzo]
Series II (ded. Isabella Stewart Gardner):
4) Fantasia in modo antico [Fantasia in antique style]. Allegro risoluto
5) Finnische Ballade [Finnish Ballade]
6) Exeunt omnes [Everyone exits]
Composed: 1895 (Beaumont)
Manuscript: Busoni Archive No.223 (sketches)
Title: Finnische Ballade
4 sheets, notated on one side only, attached
Publications:
1) Leipzig: C. F. Peters, Copyright 1896, cat. no. 2838, plates 8222 (nos. 1–3); 8223 (nos. 4–6), 36 pages
2) Helsinki: Fazer, 1957 (no. 6 only, with a note by Roberto Wis)
3) Moscow: Muzyka, 1969 (nos. 1, 2, 4, 5, ed. Grigorii Kogan)
4) Frankfurt, New York, and London: C. F. Peters, 1982
Ref: Dent, p. 342; Kindermann, pp. 213–216; Beaumont, p. 368; Roberge, p. 31.

^ BV 274: Sonatina in diem nativitatis Christi MCMXVII für Klavier zu zwei Händen
MS:
1) Wiesbaden: Breitkopf & Härtel (dated 22 December 1917, at the end of the composition)
2) SB304 (dated 19 December 1917; 21 December 1917, at the end)
Dedication: "An Benvenuto" (Benvenuto Busoni)
Pub:
1) Leipzig: Breitkopf & Härtel, Copyright 1918, cat. no. EB 5071, plate no. 27744, (9 pages)
2) Leipzig: VEB Breitkopf & Härtel, [1949] (reprint)
3) Wiesbaden: Breitkopf & Härtel, [1960 or later] (reprint)
4) Milan: Ricordi, 1986.
First performance: Tonhalle, Zürich (?); 24 January 1910; Ferruccio Busoni, piano.
Ref: Kindermann, pp. 331–332; Dent, p. 344; Roberge, p. 39; Beaumont, pp. 251, 370; Sitsky, pp. 79, 376, 381.

== Clarinet and piano compilation ==
- Ferruccio Busoni: Early Character Pieces for Clarinet and Piano
  - Pub: Munich: G. Henle Verlag; 1992; cat. no. HN 467; edited by Georg Meerwein; fingering of piano part by Klaus Schilde.
  - Note: clarinet in B♭, except as noted (cl = clarinet; pf = piano)
  - Contents: full score (cl & pf); instrumental part (cl)
    - Preface, p. V-VIII (full score only; by Georg Meerwein, Bamberg, autumn 1991)
    - Andante con moto (BV 72), pp. 1–3 (cl in C & pf); p. 2 (cl in B♭), p. 18 (cl in C)
    - Suite (BV 88):
      1. Improvvisata [Impromptu]: Allegro, pp. 4–6; p. 3
      2. Barcarola: Allegretto, pp. 7–9; p. 4
      3. Elegia: Adagio, pp. 10–12; p. 5
      4. Danza campestre, pp. 13–17; pp. 6–7
      5. Tema variato: Andante sostenuto, pp. 18–21; pp. 7–8
      6. Serenata, pp. 22–24; p. 9
    - Solo dramatique: Allegro maestoso (BV 101), pp. 25–30; pp. 10–11
    - Andantino (BV 107), pp. 31–34; pp. 12–13
    - Serenade (BV 108), pp. 35–40; pp. 14–15
    - Novellette: Allegro (BV 116), pp. 41–51; pp. 16–17
    - Comments, pp. 53–55 (full score only; by Georg Meerwein)

== Biographical notes ==
- Caroline (or Karoline) Bettelheim (1843–1891), wife of Julius Gomperz. Born in Hungary in humble circumstances, she became a pianist, sang at the Carltheater in Vienna, and from 1872 as a contralto at the Vienna Hofoper. After her marriage she gave up singing in public except at charity events. (Dent, p. 21; Beaumont, p. 16.)
- Anna Weiß-Busoni (13 January 1833 – 3 October 1909), Ferruccio Busoni's mother, was a well-known professional pianist. She and his father Ferdinando, a clarinet player, toured together frequently while Ferruccio was still a young boy. She also initiated piano, violin, and toy flute lessons with her young son not long before to his fourth birthday, when the family was living in Paris. (Dent, pp. 5, 10, 190.)
- Benvenuto Busoni (24 May 1892 – 1976), the first of Ferruccio Busoni's two sons, was born in Boston while his father held a post at the New England Conservatory of Music. He became a painter as an adult and on 28 January 1922 married Henriette Rinderknecht, a seamstress from Zurich. It has been said that he chose to marry her because she had never heard of his father. He died in Berlin. (Dent, pp. 98, 253; Beaumont, p. 348; Couling, pp. 333, 354.)
- Ferdinando Busoni (24 June 1834 – 12 May 1909) was Ferruccio Busoni's father and an accomplished clarinet player. Early in 1873, upon returning from a tour and rejoining his family in Trieste, Ferdinando took charge of Ferruccio's piano instruction shortly before the boy's seventh birthday. He also added lessons in composition. Ferruccio wrote his first preserved piece, Canzone, Op. 1 (BV 1), in June of that year. He made his first appearance in public as a pianist in a concert with his parents on 23 November 1873. (Dent, pp. 2, 16–17, 189; Kindermann, p. 21.)
- Luigi Cimoso (†15 or 16 June 1884), a pianist and teacher, was a close friend of Ferruccio Busoni and Busoni's mother Anna. (Dent, p. 24; Beaumont, p. 24.)
- Gomperz Family: In 1875 Ferrucio Busoni enrolled in the Vienna Conservatory. During his time in Vienna he was taken under the wing of the Gomperz family, who were at the center of artistic and intellectual life there. See: Julius Gomperz, Caroline Bettelheim, Theodor Gomperz, Sophie Baroness Todesco, Josephine von Wertheimstein. (Dent, p. 21.)
- Julius Gomperz, a well-known man of letters, married Caroline Bettelheim. He was a member of the Gomperz family: brother to Theodor Gomperz, Sophie Baroness Todesco, and Josephine von Wertheimstein. Julius and Caroline, who were childless, at one point proposed adopting Ferruccio Busoni, but his parents were unwilling to give him up. (Dent, p. 21.)
- Theodor Gomperz (1832–1912) was a historian of philosophy. A member of the Gomperz family: brother to Julius Gomperz, Sophie Baroness Todesco, and Josephine von Wertheimstein. (Dent, p. 21; Seising, p. 65.)
- Ersilia Grusovin was Ferruccio Busoni's cousin and the daughter of Mina Weiß Grusovin, his mother Anna's sister. (Dent, p. 8.)
- Angelo Masini (1844–1926) was an Italian tenor, admired for his portrayal of the title role in Donzetti's Don Sebastiano.
- Gino Tagliapietra (1887–1954) was an Italian pianist and composer. He became a professor at the Liceo Benedetto Marcello, Venice. (Beaumont, 1987, p. 80n.)
- Hermann de Todesco was the husband of Sophie Baroness Todesco (née Gomperz). (Dent, p. 21.)
- Sophie Baroness Todesco (née Gomperz) (1825–1895), wife of Baron Hermann de Todesco; member of the Gomperz family: sister of Theodor Gomperz, Julius Gomperz, and Josephine von Wertheimstein. She provided a tutor for the young Ferruccio Busoni (German and general subjects), and she and her sister Josephine generously contributed money toward his expenses over a period of many years. (Dent, p. 21; Seising, p. 65.)
- Josephine von Wertheimstein (née Gomperz) (1820–1894), a member of the Gomperz family: sister of Theodor Gomperz, Julius Gomperz, and Sophie Baroness Todesco. She and her sister Sophie contributed money toward Ferruccio Busoni's expenses. (Dent, p. 21; Seising, p. 65.)

== Notes ==
- ^{JU}Item, originally part of the Busoni-Archive, reported "lost" after World War II (Sitsky, 1986). More recently it has been revealed that the Jagiellonian University in Cracow has it. (Sitsky, 2008, p. 383)
