= Concerto for Piano and String Quartet (Busoni) =

Composition by Ferruccio Busoni

- by Ferruccio Busoni
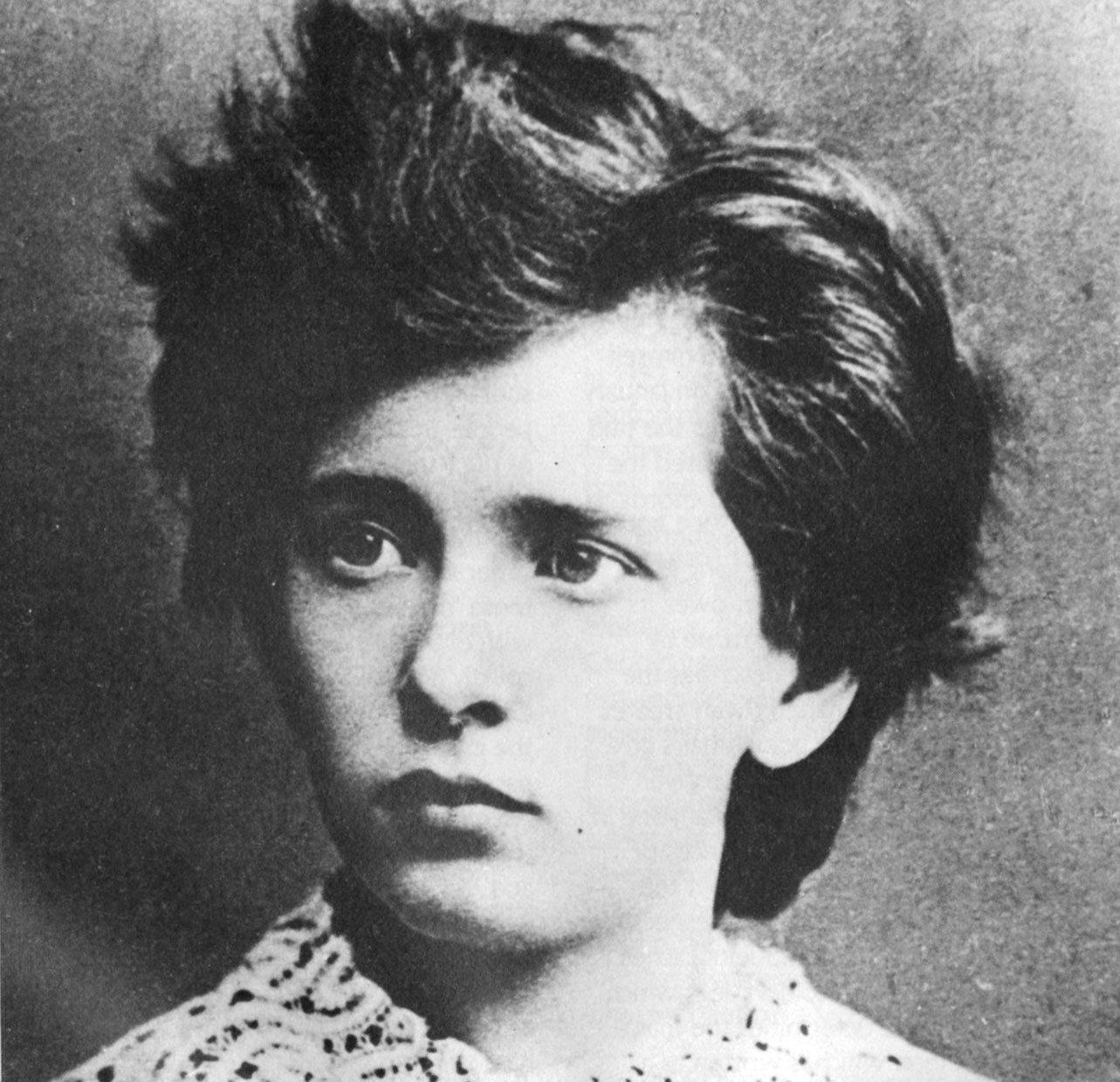
- The composer in 1877
- Other name: Concerto for Piano and Strings
- Key: D minor
- Catalogue: BV 80
- Opus: 17
- Composed: 1878: Graz
- Published: 1987: Wiesbaden
- Movements: 4

Ferruccio Busoni composed his Concerto for Piano and String Quartet in D minor, Op. 17, BV 80, in 1878, at the age of twelve. The original title was Concerto per piano-forte con accompagnamento di quartetto ad arco, Op. 17. Conceived for string quartet, the piano can also be accompanied by a string orchestra as Concerto for Piano and Strings, the title under which it was published in 1987.

== Background ==
Busoni was a child prodigy, first taught mostly by his father, both as a pianist and a composer. After studies in Vienna from age nine to eleven at the Vienna Conservatory, Busoni moved to Graz for health reasons in October 1877. The composer Wilhelm Kienzl remembered that he improvised at a mature level: "Sitting at the piano he was inspired to the most profound seriousness and totally absorbed in his task". Kienzl initiated Busoni to study with Wilhelm Mayer. Some of Busoni's early pieces were published then, including two settings of the Ave Maria and piano pieces.

The score and parts are kept by the Staatsbibliothek Preußischer Kulturbesitz in Berlin as part of Busoni's Nachlass.

== Composition ==
The structure of the work is in four movements. As such it resembles a classical string quartet more than a piano concerto, which typically has three movements:

1. Allegro
2. Adagio
3. Scherzo – Trio
4. Allegro vivace

The duration is given as 20 minutes.

The work shows little premonition of the characteristics of Busoni's mature compositions, but rather pursues Mozart's models. The reviewer of the first recording notes that the first entry of the piano shows "personalised nuance" and that the "Adagio has an unexpected seriousness but also a chaste intimacy and delicacy. The lyrical Scherzo is reminiscent of Schubert, and the rather "conventional" finale is a display of compositional skill, including fine interplay between the piano and the strings.

== Publication and recording ==
The concerto was published by Breitkopf & Härtel, Wiesbaden, in 1987, edited by Larry Sitsky. The editor recommends, based on markings of tutti and divisi, to use a string orchestra, with double bass reinforcing the cellos, which was a common practise at composition time.

It was first recorded in 1999 by Carlo Grante and the ensemble I Pomeriggi Musicali, conducted by Marco Zuccarini.
