= An die Jugend =

Sequence of classical music

- Solo piano pieces by Ferruccio Busoni
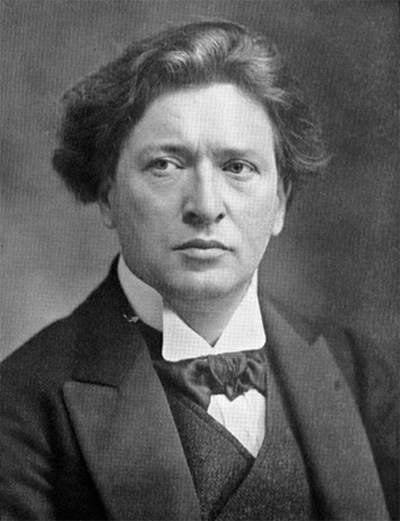
- The composer in 1906
- Catalogue: BV 254
- Composed: 1909

An die Jugend (BV 254) is a sequence (or collection) of pieces of classical music for solo piano by Ferruccio Busoni.

== Plan of the work ==
The collection was written June–August 1909 and consists of four volumes, the last with an epilogue. It was published later in the same year by Zimmermann of Leipzig under four separate catalog numbers (Z 4755, Z 4756, Z 4757, and Z 4781). Each book takes about five minutes to play, and may be played separately, or together as a cycle. As in many other works by Busoni, it is compiled from transcribed, freely adapted, and original music.

- Book 1: Preludietto, Fughetta ed Esercizio - this section uses impressionist harmonies reminiscent of Claude Debussy. In the "Esercizio", chords suggesting A major in the left hand are juxtaposed with passages in the right based on the whole tone scale.
- Book 2: Preludio, Fuga e Fuga figurata (Studie nach J. S. Bach's Wohltemperiertem Klavier) - The "Preludio" and "Fuga" are almost unaltered transcriptions of the D major prelude and fugue from the first book of Bach's Well-Tempered Clavier. The "Fuga figurata" presents elements of the prelude and fugue simultaneously.
- Book 3: Giga, Bolero e Variazione (Studie nach Mozart) - The "Giga" is based on Wolfgang Amadeus Mozart's Eine kleine Gigue, K. 574, the "Bolero" is based on the fandango in the Act III finale of The Marriage of Figaro, while the "Variazione" is a variation on the "Giga".
- Book 4: Introduzione e Capriccio (Paganinesco) & Epilogo - The "Introduzione" is a transcription of the opening of Niccolò Paganini's Caprice No. 11 for solo violin and the "Capriccio" is an arrangement of his Caprice No. 15, followed by a return of the material from the "Introduzione," but in modified and grandiose style. Busoni embellishes the originals, creating a difficult piece reminiscent of the elaborate early versions of Franz Liszt's own Paganini transcriptions. In the epilogue, music from Book 1 returns. Although, as before, the harmonic language is impressionist and tonal centres are unclear, the piece closes with a cadence in C major. (The epilogue is omitted, when the books are not played as a cycle.)

== First performance ==
The first performance, of Books 2, 3, and 4 (without "Epilogo"), was on 16 October 1909 in Bechstein Hall, London, with Busoni as the pianist.

== The first Sonatina ==
The materials of Book 1, and the "Epilogo," all related and highly original compositions, and written in the new style first explored in Elegien (BV 249), were later revised and combined with a new introduction and short linking passages presenting the thematic roots of the pieces and gluing them together into a single entity. The new piece, resembling a set of variations without a theme, Busoni entitled Sonatina (BV 257). This more advanced and forward-looking composition was the first of what would eventually be six "sonatinas" containing some of the most unusual and original piano music of the early 20th century.

== Composition and publication details ==
1) Preludietto, Fughetta ed Esercizio

•Composed: June 1909 (Beaumont)
•Manuscript: Busoni Archive No. 264

•Title: Preludietto [and] Fughetta
•3 separate pages, written on one side only, unpaginated

•Original publication: Leipzig: Jul. Heinr. Zimmermann, Copyright 1909, cat. no. Z. 4755, (11 pages)
•Dedication: Josef Turczyński
•Duration: 5 minutes (Beaumont)

2) Preludio, Fuga e Fuga figurata

•Composed: July 1909
•Manuscript: Busoni Archive No. 240

•Title: Fuga figurata. (nach dem Prael. + Fuga aus dem W. Cl. v. J. S. Bach)
•4 pages (1 notated, 2 blank, 1 notated)
•Date: "3. Juli 1909 F. Busoni" (at the end of the composition)

•Original publication: Leipzig: Jul. Heinr. Zimmermann, Copyright [1909], cat. no. Z. 4756, (11 pages)
•Dedication: Louis Theodor Grünberg
•Duration: 4 minutes (Beaumont)

3) Giga, Bolero e Variazione

•Composed: July 1909 (Beaumont)
•Manuscript: Busoni Archive No. 240 (attachment)

•Title: Variazione (Gigue – Bolero e Variazione) (d'après Mozart)
•1 page with only 6 measures

•Original publication: Leipzig: Jul. Heinr. Zimmermann, Copyright [1909], cat. no. Z. 4757, (11 pages)
•Dedication: Leo Sirota
•Duration: 4 minutes (Beaumont)

4) Introduzione e Capriccio (Paganinesco) & Epilogo

•Composed: August 1909 (Beaumont)
•Manuscript: unknown
•Original publication: Leipzig: Jul. Heinr. Zimmermann, Copyright 1909, cat. no. Z. 4781, (13 pages)
•Dedication: Louis Closson; Emile R. Blanchet (Epilogo)
•Duration: 7 minutes (Beaumont)

•Note: Four of the dedicatees (Turczyński, Gruenberg, Sirota, Closson) were master class pupils of Busoni in Vienna, Jul 1908 (Beaumont, 1987, p. 91), while Blanchet had been a pupil at a master class in Weimar, Jul-Sep, 1899 (Dent).

•Later Publications:

1) Leipzig: Breitkopf & Härtel, n.d. [1909], cat. nos. E.B. 4944-4947.
2) Milan: Carisch & Jänichen, n.d.
3) No. 2: In Bach-Busoni Edition, Volume IV, 1916.
4) No. 4 (without Epilogo): In Klavierübung, Book 10, 1925.

•Ref: Dent, pp. 125, 224; Beaumont, pp. 91, 148-157, 368; Sitsky, pp. 65-66, 206-208, 264-266, 289-290, 373, 374; Kindermann, p. 242; Roberge, p. 34.

== Free scores ==
- An die Jugend: Scores at the International Music Score Library Project
