= Elegies (Busoni) =

1908 piano pieces by Ferruccio Busoni

- Solo piano pieces by Ferruccio Busoni
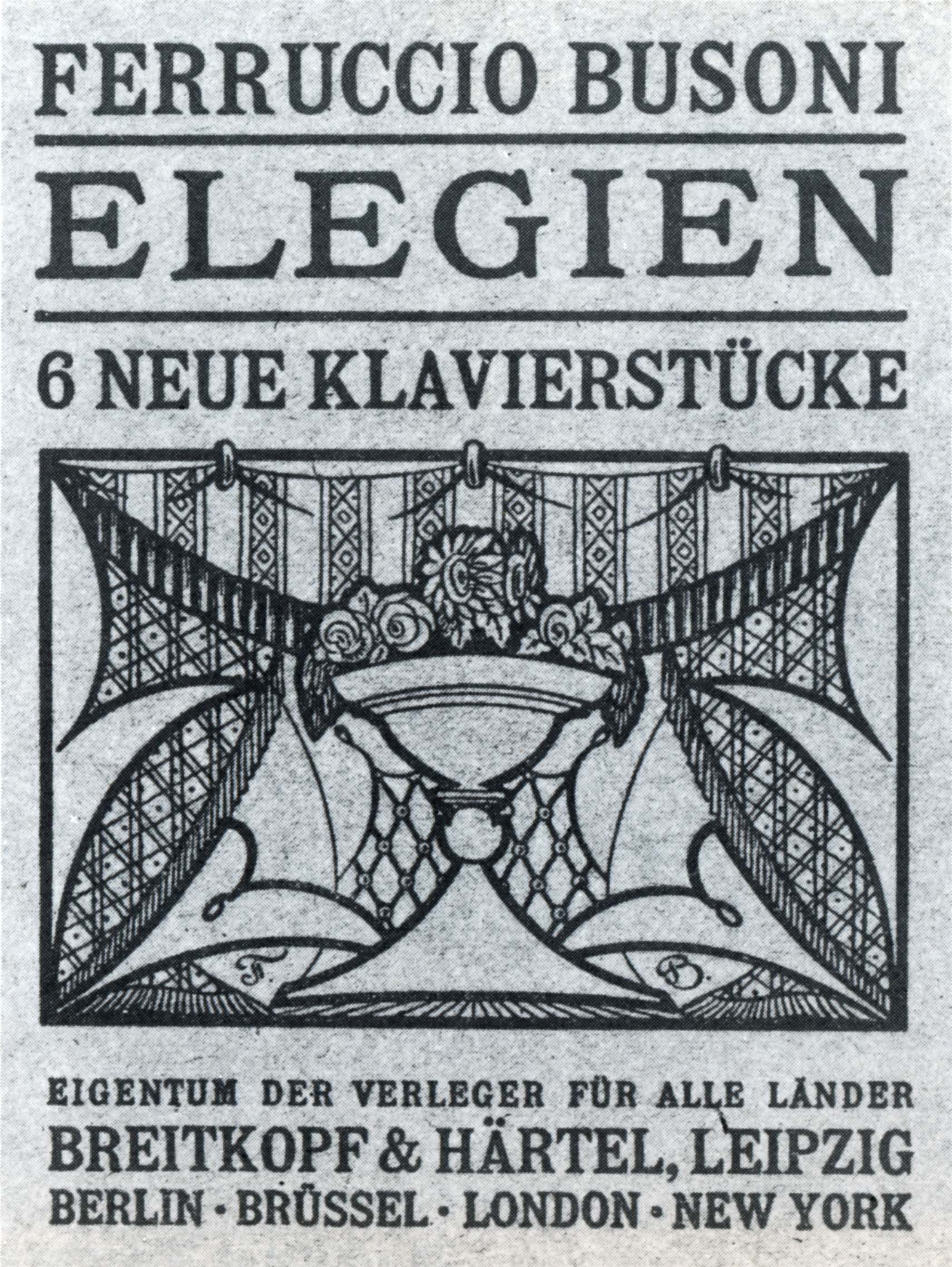
- Cover of the first edition in 1908, including a design by Busoni
- Catalogue: BV 249
- Composed: 1907

Elegies (German: Elegien), BV 249, by the Italian composer Ferruccio Busoni is a set of solo piano pieces which can be played as a cycle or separately. Initially published in 1908 with six pieces, it was subsequently expanded to seven by the addition of the Berceuse (BV 252). The set of seven takes just over 40 minutes to play.

== Sections of the work ==
The seven pieces are titled as follows:

1. Nach der Wendung (Recueillement) ["After the Turning" (Contemplation)]
1. All' Italia! (In modo napolitano) ["To Italy!" (In a Neapolitan Mode)]
2. Meine Seele bangt und hofft zu Dir (Choralvorspiel) ["My soul trembles and hopes of thee" (Chorale Prelude)]
3. Turandots Frauengemach (Intermezzo) ["Turandot's Zenana" (Intermezzo)]
4. Die Nächtlichen (Walzer) ["The Nocturnal" (Waltz)]
5. Erscheinung (Notturno) ["Visitation" (Nocturne)]
6. Berceuse ["Lullaby"]

Although labelled as "Neue Klavierstücke" [New Piano Pieces] by the publisher Breitkopf & Härtel, that is not a totally accurate description, since three of the pieces are based on other, older compositions by the composer. No. 2 is based on the All' Italiana (4th movement) of the Piano Concerto (BV 247), although the music itself is not entirely from that movement. A particularly effective moment is based on a section of the second movement marked "in modo napolitano." Nos. 4 and 5 come from the Turandot Suite (BV 248), and were later used in the opera Turandot (BV 273). A further three pieces were also used again: No. 3 became the introductory "Preludio corale" of the Fantasia contrappuntistica (BV 256), No. 6 was used for Act I part 1 of the opera Die Brautwahl (BV 258), and No. 7 was extended into the orchestral masterpiece Berceuse élégiaque (BV 252a).

== New musical style ==
The Elegies mark a significant change in Busoni's compositional approach. Up to this point he had composed in the Romantic style, reaching a level of full mastery, as exemplified by the Violin Concerto (BV 243) and the Piano Concerto (BV 247). The harmonic language of the Elegies is extended, with the pedal used audaciously to blend disparate tones: unrelated triads are overlapped and juxtaposed; chords are constructed from intervals other than thirds; unusual and highly chromatic scales and runs, often differing from the surrounding harmonies, are extensively employed and varied; melodies, and solitary "sighs," moving by whole and half steps, magnify these disorienting effects.

Busoni recognized the change: "My entire personal vision I put down at last and for the first time in the Elegies" and "the Elegies signify a milestone in my development. Almost a transformation. Hence the title, 'nach der Wendung'." Even the backward-looking pieces based on previously published works (the tarantella and neapolitan song from the Piano Concerto, and Frauengemach and Die Nächtlichen from the Turandot Suite) have been changed to reflect his new outlook. Tonality is weakened by the use of bitonality. Introductory measures, bridge passages, and transpositions have been added which incorporate this new style.

== First performance and critical reaction ==
With his publication of the Sketch of a New Aesthetic of Music in 1907 Busoni had become identified as one of the leaders of the musical avant-garde. With this, of course, came both new friends and opponents, many with rather strong feelings and opinions. "Every new composition would be avidly awaited, on the one hand by the blood-lusty opponents of the new, on the other by those eager to show themselves up-to-date." Nevertheless, Busoni plunged ahead with a performance of all six pieces on 12 March 1909 at the Beethovensaal in Berlin.

"Turandots Frauengemach" was well received, and to this day remains the most popular of the six. Otherwise, the critics reactions were generally negative, and sometimes downright hostile. August Spamuth's review in Signale für die musikalische Welt is representative:

[Busoni] conducts, composes, agitates etc. He is one of those restless spirits who are never satisfied with what has been achieved, who can never call a halt.... He is something of a born opposer of the Establishment and when that for which he strives with all his power, a new aesthetic of music, is established and recognized, Busoni will become its irreconcilable opponent....

Busoni's six elegies were a veritable source of dismay, with the exception of the fourth, which bears the title "Turandots Frauengemach." He who knew something of Busoni's strivings for a new harmonic system and of his belief that he has already achieved new tonalities through curiously built scales, could certainly perceive a structural logic and an aesthetically ordered system of sound deployment in these pieces; but novelty seekers will have found as little "music" here as the normal, naïve listener ... No, no and no again, these were not the inspirations of a man ahead of his time, these were simply calculations.... What a weird creature, for instance, is the "waltz" entitled "Die Nächtlichen." I trust they aren't "All-Nächtlichen."

Later, after more public performances, Busoni was well aware of the negative public reaction, but still clearly believed he had chosen the correct path. In a letter to Egon Petri he wrote, "Thank you for your kind words about the Elegies. On several occasions I have now found that they appear infinitely simpler to the reader than to the listener. In these pieces I am particularly proud of the form and clarity. For instance, the structure and proportions of the "Erscheinung" seem exemplary."

== Manuscript and publication details ==
Manuscripts:

1) Busoni Archive No. 237 (some as sketches)

Title: "Nach der Wendung" 5 neue Clavierstücke von Ferruccio Busoni
Date: 15. "September 1907 bis 20. November"
Note: Die Nächtlichen is included as a sketch, although it was not included in the count of 5, and remained unnamed.

2) Busoni Archive No. 238

Title page: 6 Elegien 1907-1908
Section titles and dedications:

1) Nach der Wendung. Recueillement. Dedication: Gottfried Galston
2) All' Italia! in modo napolitana. Dedication: Egon Petri
3) "Meine Seele bangt und hofft zu Dir".Choralvorspiel. Dedication: Gregor Beklemischeff
4) Turandot's Frauengemach. Intermezzo. Dedication: Michael von Zadora
5) Die Nächtlichen. Walzer. Dedication: O'Neill Philipps
6) Erscheinung. (Notturno.) Dedication: Leo Kestenberg

3) Staatsarchiv, Leipzig

Title: Berceuse
Dedication: Johan Wijsman
Date: 5. Juni 1909.
4 pages, unpaginated, unattached

Publications:

1) Nos. 1-6: Leipzig: Breitkopf & Härtel, Copyright 1908, cat. nos. EB 26042-46, 26052, plate nos. Klav. Bibl. 26042-26046 (nos.1-5); Klav. Bibl. 26052 (no.6), (57 pages)

Title: Elegien. 6 neue Klavierstücke
•Notes:

a) Section titles and dedications are the same as for manuscript no. 238.
b) The 6 piano pieces may be performed as a cycle or separately. When performed as a cycle, the last piece (Erscheinung) ends with a motive from the beginning of the first (Nach der Wendung). When not played as part of a cycle, the last piece has a different ending.

2) No. 7: Leipzig: Breitkopf & Härtel, Copyright 1909, cat. no. V.A. 3053, (7 pages)

Title: Berceuse pour le piano
Dedication: Johan Wijsman

3) Nos. 1-7: Leipzig: Breitkopf & Härtel, (1908/09), cat. no. EB 5214, plate nos. 26042-26046 (nos.1-5), 26052 (no.6), 26282 (no.7), (52 pages)

Title: Elegien. Sieben neue Klavierstücke
Note: includes Berceuse (BV 252) as no.7, dedicated to Johan Wysman
Reprints: Leipzig: VEB Breitkopf & Härtel, [1949 ff.]; Wiesbaden: Breitkopf & Härtel, [1966]

4) No. 2: Leipzig: Breitkopf & Härtel, 1908, Cat. no. V.A. 2907, (15 pages)

Title: Zwei Klavierstücke aus den Elegien. All' Italia! In modo napolitano
Note: According to the Breitkopf & Härtel catalog this publication appeared in 1909.

5) No. 4: Leipzig: Breitkopf & Härtel, 1908, Cat. no. V.A. 2908, (7 pages)

Title: Zwei Klavierstücke aus den Elegien. Turandots Frauengemach. Intermezzo
Note: According to the Breitkopf & Härtel catalog this publication appeared in 1909.

6) Nos. 2 & 4: Moscow: Muzyka, 1969 (ed. Grigorii Kogan)

7) No. 4: New York and London: G. Schirmer, 1975 (in Encores of Great Pianists, ed. Raymond Lewenthal)

8) Nos. 1-7: Miami Lanes, FL: Masters Music Publications, [1989?], cat. no. M1074

9) Nos. 1-7: Mineola, NY: Dover Publications, 1996, in The Complete Elegies, the Six Sonatinas, and Other Original Works for Solo Piano, Ferruccio Busoni, pp. 35-86. ISBN 0-486-29386-6

== Free scores ==
- Elegien: Scores at the International Music Score Library Project

== Recordings ==
Note: Select the catalog number link for additional recording details.

- David Rubinstein (Musicus 1001; LP with limited availability)
- Martin Jones (Argo ZRG 741; LP with limited availability)
- Geoffrey Douglas Madge (Philips 420 740-2)
- Roland Pöntinen (CPO 999 853-2)
- Jeni Slotchiver (Centaur CRC 2438)
- Geoffrey Tozer, "All'Italia!" and "Turandots Frauengemach" (Chandos 9394)
- Alfred Brendel, "Meine Seele bangt und hofft zu Dir" and "Erscheinung" (see Alfred Brendel – Unpublished Live and Radio Performances 1968–2001)
