= Berceuse élégiaque =

- by Ferruccio Busoni
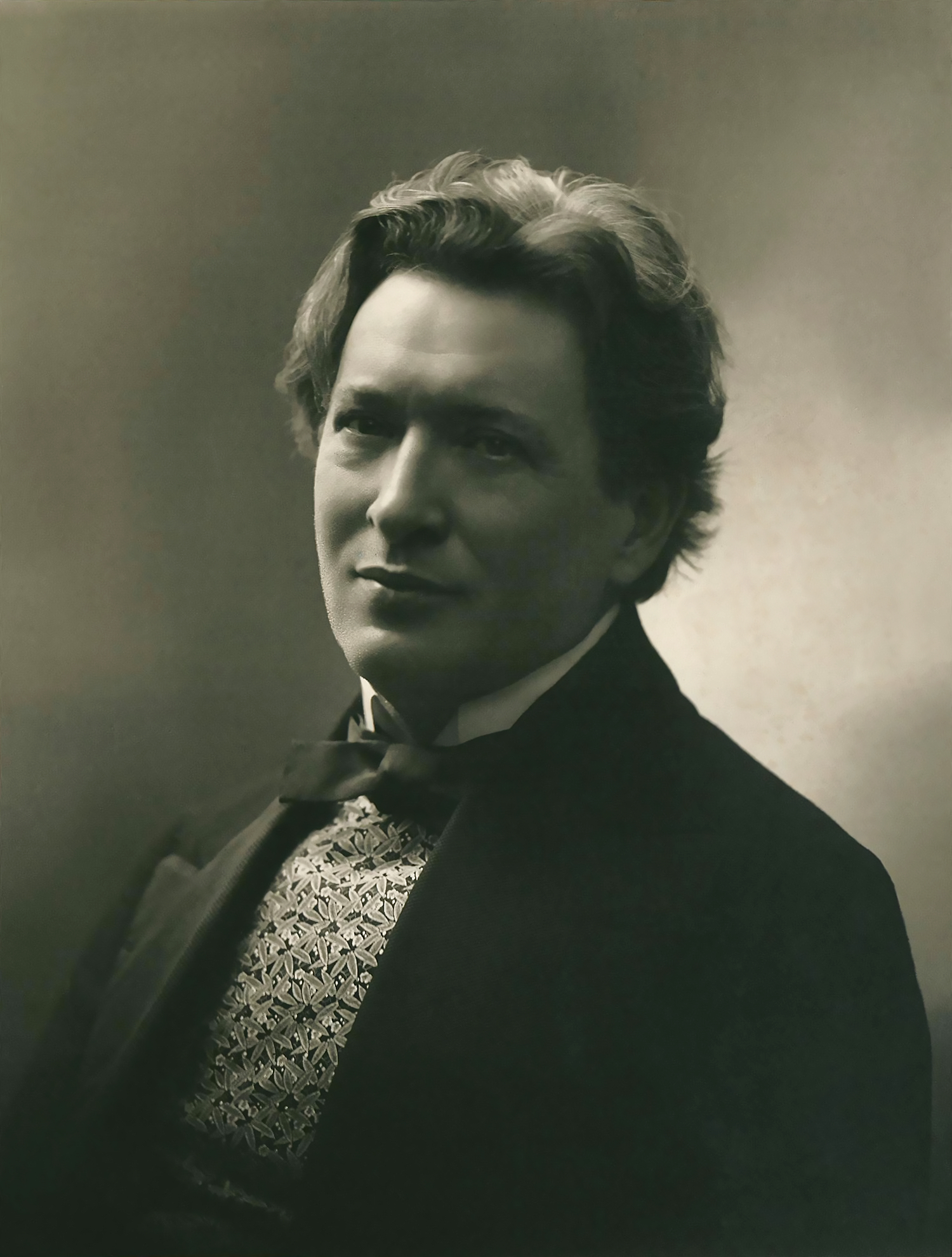
- Busoni in 1913
- Catalogue: BV 252a
- Opus: 42
- Composed: 1909
- Scoring: orchestra

Berceuse élégiaque, Op. 42 (BV 252a), is an orchestral work composed by Ferruccio Busoni in 1909. Originally written for solo piano, to be added as the seventh piece in his 1907 collection Elegies, Busoni adapted it for orchestra later the same year. This orchestral version was sub-titled "Des Mannes Wiegenlied am Sarge seiner Mutter" ("The man's lullaby at his mother's coffin"). The first performance of Berceuse élégiaque was in New York City on February 21, 1911, and was conducted by Gustav Mahler in his last concert before his death.

The piece is dedicated: “In memoriam Anna Busoni, n. Weiss, m. 3.Oct.MCMIX”

== Recordings ==
- Schoenberg Ensemble conducted Reinbert de Leeuw, 1993, Koch Schwann, Mahler arranged Schoenberg and Busoni
- Piano version Ferrucio Busoni, Michele Campanella, Elegien (Nr 7. Berceuse) Indianisches Tagebuch, 1980, reissued by Warner 1991
