= Fantasia contrappuntistica =

- Solo piano piece by Ferruccio Busoni
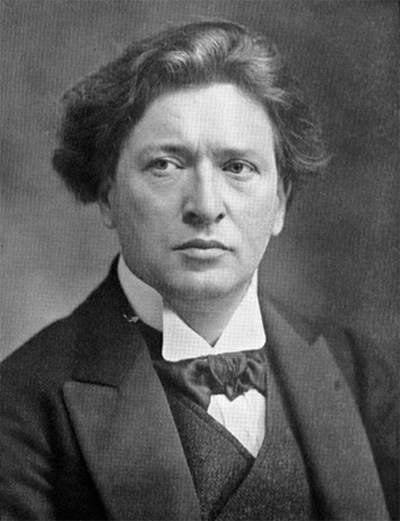
- The composer in 1906
- Catalogue: BV 256
- Composed: 1910
- Dedication: Wilhelm Middelschulte, Richard Buhlig
- Published: 1910: Leipzig
- Publisher: Breitkopf & Härtel
- Duration: 25 minutes
- Scoring: Solo piano

Fantasia contrappuntistica (BV 256) is a solo piano piece composed by Ferruccio Busoni in 1910. Busoni created a number of versions of the work, including several for solo piano and one for two pianos. It has been arranged for organ (by Wilhelm Middelschulte, dedicatee of the work, whom Busoni praised as "Meister des Kontrapunktes") and for orchestra (by Frederick Stock) under the composer's supervision.

The work is in large part a homage to Johann Sebastian Bach's Die Kunst der Fuge. Conversely, Kaikhosru Shapurji Sorabji's Opus clavicembalisticum appears to be a homage to Fantasia contrappuntistica.

== Sections and Piece analysis ==
Noel Mewton-Wood plays the piece (BBC 1953)

Fantasia contrappuntistica is written in twelve parts, and takes about 25 minutes to perform:

1. Preludio corale
2. Fuga I
3. Fuga II
4. Fuga III (on B-A-C-H)
5. Intermezzo
6. Variazione I
7. Variazione II
8. Variazione III
9. Cadenza
10. Fuga IV
11. Corale
12. Stretta

The first ten pages of the introductory "Preludio corale" are nearly identical to the Third Elegy with a few small cuts and alterations, including the removal of all German expression marks or their translation into Italian. In the third fugue, the subject is composed of four notes, which are B♭, A, C, and B♮. These four notes spell Bach in German, where the H is the B♮, and are commonly known as the B-A-C-H motif.

== Manuscripts ==
The manuscripts in Busoni's hand are in the Berlin State Library as part of the Busoni Archive.

== Publication history ==
- BV 255 Große Fuge

1) Title: Große Fuge. Kontrapunktische Fantasie über Joh. Seb. Bach's letztes unvollendetes Werk für Klavier ausgeführt. [Great Fugue. Contrapuntal Fantasy on Joh. Seb. Bach's Last Unfinished Work (from the "Art of the Fugue," BWV 1080), realized for piano.]

Published: New York: G. Schirmer, Copyright 1910, plate no. 22004, (100 copies printed privately), (39 pages).
Dedication: An Wilhelm Middelschulte Meister des Kontrapunktes
Dated (p. 39): Begonnen auf dem Dampfer "Barbarossa" um Neujahr 1910. Beendet in New Orleans am 1. März 1910. [Begun on the steamship "Barbarossa" on New Year's 1910. Finished in New Orleans on 1 March 1910.]
Notes:

1) p. 30: "Diese Zusammenstellung des Hauptthemas aus der Kunst der Fuge mit den drei vorigen Subjecten verdanke ich den Studien des Herrn Bernhard Ziehm in Chicago. F. B." ["For this combination of the main themes from the Art of the Fugue I am indebted to Mr. Berhard Ziehm in Chicago. F. B. (Ferruccio Busoni).]
2) p. 38: "Partitur-Darstellung der Durchführung auf S. 33, welche aus clavieristischen Gründen dort eingeschränkt ercheint." ["Score-representation of the execution on p. 33, which is abridged there for pianistic reasons."]
3) p. 39, the plan of the work: "Fuga I: Subject 1; Fuga II: Subject 2 und 1; Fuga III: Subject 3 und die vorigen: Intermezzo: Subject 3; Variazione 1.: Subject 1; Variazione 2: Subject 3; Variazione 3: Subject 2 and die vorigen; Cadenza: Subject 3 and 4; Fuga IV: Subject 4 and the vorigen; Stretta"

Ref: Kindermann, pp. 244–245.

2) Published: Boston: Boston Music Company, 1910

Ref: Roberge, p. 35.

- BV 256 Fantasia contrappuntistica (edizione definitiva)

1) Title: Fantasia contrappuntistica. Preludio al Corale "Gloria al Signore nei Cieli" e Fuga a quattro obbligati sopra un frammento di Bach. Compilita per il Pianoforte. (Edizione definitiva) [Contrapuntal Fantasy. Prelude to the chorale "Glory to the Lord in Heaven" and Fugue in four obbligato voices on a fragment of Bach. Compiled for the piano.]

Leipzig: Breitkopf & Härtel, Copyright 1910, cat.no. V.A. 3491 (45 pages)
Dated: (Giugno 1910).
Note: The plan of the work, "Distribuzione dell'opera", is on the final unpaginated page.
Ref: Kindermann, pp. 245–250.

2) Title: Fantasia contrappuntistica

Published: Leipzig: Breitkopf & Härtel, [1916], cat. no. BB IV.
In: Bach-Busoni Complete Edition, Vol. IV, pp. 82–123 (42 pages); pp. 125–127 (Appendix) (3 pages)
Dedication: An Wilhelm Middelschulte, Meister des Kontrapunktes.
Reprint: Leipzig: Breitkopf & Härtel, [1920], cat. no. BB IV.
Note: The Appendix contains music cut from Fuga IV and still present at this point [in the score] in the first edition, which Busoni decided to omit for public performance.
Ref: Kindermann, pp. 245–250.

3) Title: Fantasia contrappuntistica

Published: Wiesbaden: Breitkopf & Härtel, [1983] (Roberge), cat. no. Edition Breitkopf 3491, pp. 1–43; pp. 44–45 (Appendix)
Dedication: An Wilhelm Middelschulte, Meister des Kontrapunktes.
Note: The Appendix contains music cut from Fuga IV (p. 37) and still present at this point [in the score] in the first edition, which Busoni decided to omit for public performance.
Ref: IMSLP #03400 Image:Busoni fc.pdf (14:08, 2 September 2008)
Ref: Roberge, p. 35.

- BV 256a Fantasia contrappuntistica (edizione minore)

1) Title: Choral-Vorspiel und Fuge über ein Bachsches Fragment (Der "Fantasia Contrappuntistica" kleine Ausgabe). Preludio al Corale e Fuga sopra un frammento di Bach (Edizione minore della "Fantasia Contrappuntistica") [Chorale Prelude and Fugue on a Bach Fragment (Minor edition of the "Fantasia Contrappuntistica")]

Published: Leipzig: Breitkopf & Härtel, Copyright 1912, cat.no. V.A. 3829 (21 pages)
Dedication: gewidmet Richard Buhlig.
Note: This edition contains a preface by Busoni.

2) Title: same as for (1)

Published: Leipzig: Breitkopf & Härtel, [1916], cat. no. BB IV.
In: Bach-Busoni Complete Edition Vol. IV, pp. 61–79.
Dedication: An Richard Buhlig.
Note: This edition contains a foreword.
Reprint: Leipzig: Breitkopf & Härtel, [1920], cat. no. BB IV.
Ref: Kindermann, pp. 250–251.

- BV 256b Fantasia contrappuntistica (for two pianos)

1) Title: Fantasia contrappuntistica. Choral-Variationen über "Ehre sei Gott in der Höhe" gefolgt von einer Quadrupel-Fuge über einBachsches Fragment für zwei Klaviere [Chorale Variations on "Glory to God in the Highest" followed by a quadruple fugue on a Bach fragment for two pianos.]

Published: Leipzig: Breitkopf & Härtel, Copyright 1922, cat.no. E.B. 5196, plate no. 28713 (68 pages)
Dedication: An das Künstler- und Freundespaar Kwast-Hodapp.
Notes:

1) According to a later entry in Schnapp's Busoni-Archive catalog, the now-lost autograph had the following date at the end: "Berlin, 3. Juli 1921"
2) The Busoni-Archive of the Berlin State Library (Busoni-Archive No. 356) preserves a proof copy with Busoni's handwritten corrections.
3) On the back of the title page is a plan of the work: "A. Analytischer 1. Choral-Variationen (Einleitung – Choral und Variationen – Übergang). 2. Fuga I. 3. Fuga II. 4. Fuga III. 5. Intermezzo. 6. Variato I. 7. Variato II. 8. Variato III. 9. Cadenza. 10. Fuga IV. 11. Corale. 12. Stretta. – B. Architektonischer: Zeichnung in Form einer Gebäudefassade."
4) According to the B&H Busoni catalog this edition appeared in 1921.

Reprints:

1) Leipzig: VEB Breitkopf & Härtel, [1955 or later]
2) Wiesbaden: Breitkopf & Härtel, [1966]

Ref: Kindermann, p. 251.

== Arrangements ==
- Fantasia contrappuntistica: Transcribed for large orchestra and organ by Frederick Stock.
  - Title: Sinfonia contrappuntistica. Choralvorspiel (Gott in der Höh' allein sei Ehr) und Fuge über ein Fragment von J. S. Bach. Original für Clavier von Ferruccio Busoni. In Grosses Orchester und Orgel übertragen von Fr. A. Stock
  - Manuscript: Autograph of Frederick A. Stock, Chicago.
  - Date of composition: "begonnen Donnerstag, 24. Juli 1911 – beendet Freitag, 11. August 1911. Düsseldorf."
  - Instrumentation: 3 flutes, 3 oboes, 3 clarinets, 2 bassoons, contrabassoon; 4 horns, 3 trumpets, 3 trombones, tuba; timpani, percussion (glockenspiel); harp, organ; strings
  - Score: 96 pages with notes.
  - First performance: 21 August 1911, Dortmund.
  - Note: The Stock orchestration was authorized by Busoni, who heard the first performance with mixed reactions: 'What the layman understands by "music of the angels" was brought into being. Stock's orchestral arrangement is un-mystical and, for my taste, lacking in fragrancy and in transparency, though in some parts brilliant work.' In 1913, Busoni was scheduled to conduct this version for the Royal Philharmonic Society of London. At the rehearsals, he began to insist on changes to the orchestration, but there was inadequate time for the new parts to be copied out, so the work was withdrawn. As a result, this version has never been played again.
  - Ref: Kindermann, p. 249; Beaumont, pp. 170, 175; Roberge, p. 35.
- Fantasia contrappuntistica: Transcribed for organ by Wilhelm Middelschulte.
  - Title: Ferruccio Busoni. Fantasia Contrappuntistica. Preludio e Corale "Gloria al Signore nei Cieli" e Fuga a quattro soggetti obligati sopra un framment di Bach. Für Orgel übertragen von Wilhelm Middelschulte.
  - Date of composition: 1911
  - Published: Leipzig: Breitkopf & Härtel, 1912. EB 3612
  - Ref: Kindermann, p. 249; Beaumont, p. 160; Roberge, p. 35; Sitsky, p. 140.
- Fantasia Contrappuntistica: Newly transcribed for organ by Helmut Bornefeld.
  - Title: Ferruccio Busoni. Fantasia Contrappuntistica über ein Bachsches Fragment für Orgel bearbeitet von Helmut Bornefeld.
  - Date of composition: "Berabeitung fertiggestellt am 10. Oktober 1955."
  - Manuscript: Wiesbaden: Breitkopf & Härtel
  - Published: Wiesbaden: Breitkopf & Härtel, 1962, EB 6342, plate no. Wb. 495, (64 pages).
  - Notes:
    1. Foreword, dated "Heidenheim-Brenz, März 1962"
    2. Generally uses the text of the two-piano version, BV 256b
  - Ref: Kindermann, p. 249; Beaumont, p. 160, 176; Roberge, p. 35; Sitsky, p. 140–141.
- Fantasia Contrappuntistica: Transcribed for double string orchestra, piano, 2 harps and celesta by Antony Beaumont.
  - Date of composition: 1971
  - Dedication: to Ronald Stevenson
  - Published: Wiesbaden: Breitkopf & Härtel, 1977 (manuscript facsimile).
  - Note: Generally uses the text of the two-piano version, BV 256b, but restores some of the cuts in the fugues. Acknowledges debt to Bartók for the choice of instrumentation which resembles that of Bartók's Music for Strings, Percussion and Celesta. The first movement of the Bartók piece is also a fugue which employs Bernhard Ziehn's symmetrical techniques.
  - Ref: Beaumont, pp. 160, 176; Roberge, p. 35.
- Fantasia Contrappuntistica: Transcribed for orchestra by Larry Sitsky.
  - Title: Concerto for Orchestra: Completion and Realization of Busoni's "Fantasia Contrappuntistica"
  - Date of composition: 1984
  - Published: Australian Music Centre
  - Ref: Roberge, p. 35; Sitsky, p. 157–161.
