= Richard Sahla =

German concert violinist

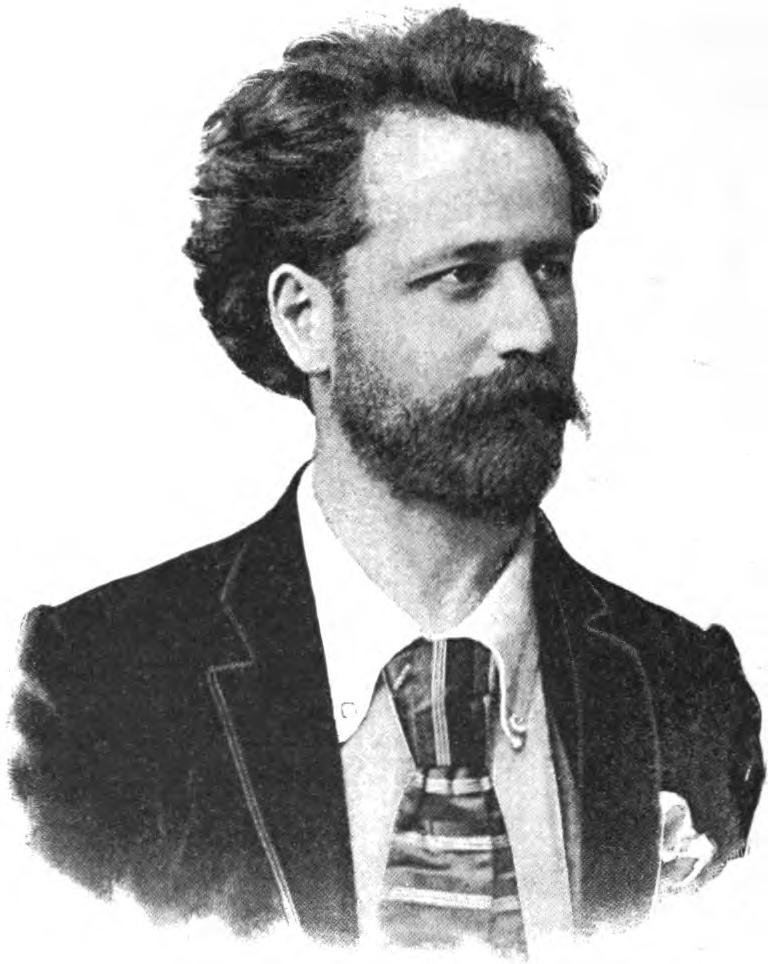
Richard Sahla

Richard Sahla (17 September 1855 in Graz – 30 April 1931 in Bückeburg) was a concert violinist, conductor and composer.

== Biography ==
Richard Sahla grew up in his hometown Graz, where he quickly acquired a reputation as child prodigy. He excelled on the violin and the piano. Aged 13 he started studying the violin as a pupil of Ferdinand David at the Conservatory in Leipzig, University of Music and Theatre Leipzig, today the Hochschule für Musik und Theater "Felix Mendelssohn Bartholdy" Leipzig. He finished as one of the most outstanding students of this world-famous institution. He played his debut concert aged eighteen at the Gewandhaus in Leipzig to rapturous applause for his "technically mature and musically exhilarating play". His friend Wilhelm Kienzl describes Sahla's next steps in his autobiography. Both had studied composition under Wilhelm Mayer (also known as W. A. Rémy), whose students included the composers Ferruccio Busoni, Josef Gauby, Richard Heuberger, Emil von Reznicek and Felix Weingartner.

Having received his diploma at the Conservatory in Leipzig, the Mecca of violinists, the eighteen-year-old Sahla embarked on an impressive career as violin virtuoso. He quickly gained a reputation as one of the most talented violinists. "He elicits his Stradivari celestial sounds. Golden purity engages with the sweet scent of poetry!" That was how one critic expressed his enthusiasm in 1880 after a concert at the Vienna Royal Opera (Wiener Hofoper).

On 1 October 1875, aged twenty, Sahla joined the court orchestra (Hofkapelle) of Schaumburg-Lippe as a first solo-violinist for eight months. After which he accepted the post of prime-concertmaster (Konzertmeister) in Gothenburg, Sweden. From 1878 to 1880 he was a member of the Orchestra of the Vienna Royal Opera where he was a celebrated soloist. The Viennese press praised him as an equal of the Spanish violinist Pablo de Sarasate. Sahla's compositions for violin and piano: Spanischer Tanz, Nocturno Nr. 1 (B flat major) and Nocturno Nr. 2 (E major) are dedicated in reverence to Pablo de Sarasate.

During the autumn of 1881 Sahla, Wilhelm Kienzl and the coloratura soprano Aglaja Orgeni engaged on a 66 concerts tour through Hungary, Croatia, Central and Northern Germany. This turned out to be rather more exciting than foreseen when the impresario ran off with the takings. During this tour Sahla wrote his Rumänische Rhapsodie, which he dedicated to his friend Princess Amalie Hügel-Teck, daughter of the Duke of Würtemberg and niece of Queen Victoria.

From 1882 to early 1888 Richard Sahla was First Concertmaster and first solo-violinist at the Royal Opera in Hanover, where he struck up many friendships. Amongst these were the Liszt pupil Ingeborg von Bronsart, an internationally acclaimed pianist and composer as well as her husband Hans Bronsart von Schellendorff, director of the Royal Theatre in Hanover between 1867 and 1887. Sahla published a Ballad for violin and piano dedicated to Ingeborg von Bonsart.

On 1 April 1888 he started in his position as Music Director and chief-conductor (Hofkapellmeister) at the court in Bückeburg. He increased the court's orchestra and gave a series of concerts in Hanover, Bremen, Hamburg and Berlin. The 40-strong ensemble became well-known beyond the principality of Schaumburg-Lippe. The composer, pianist and organist Max Reger for instance came to Bückeburg in 1911 as soloist with Sahla conducting. But Sahla too, continued his career as soloist with great success. His repertoire included Paganini’s Violin Concerto No. 1 and Beethoven’s Violin Concerto. As conductor he concentrated his attention largely on composers which were not yet widely appreciated. Among them Berlioz, Brahms, Bruckner, Debussy, Mahler, Sibelius as well as Richard Strauss and Richard Wagner. As guest conductor he often worked with the Berlin Philharmonics. In Berlin he conducted the world premiers of all of Henri Marteau’s violin concertos. Marteau like Reger was a close friend. The Hungarian conductor Arthur Nikisch said about Sahla: "He is a supremely gifted and exquisite artist".

After World War I Sahla faced difficult times. For a while he earned his living as violinist in coffee houses and variety theatres. He spent some time with his wife in the United States. Anna-Ruth Sahla, singer at the court of Schaumburg-Lippe, was born in America. Richard Sahla's last public performance in Bückeburg was in 1925 at a concert in honour of his 70th birthday.

Original scores of his compositions are kept at the state archive (Staatsarchiv) in Bückeburg.

The violinist David-F. Tebbe came across a number of published compositions by Sahla whilst researching for his bachelor's thesis: Richard Sahla – violin virtuoso, maestro and forgotten composer – submitted to Prof. Dr.de:Thomas Schipperges at the Hochschule für Musik und Darstellende Kunst Mannheim (Mannheim University of Music and Performing Arts). During Tebbe's research Sahla's grandson, the journalist, television presenter and author Peter Sahla, provided David Tebbe with a large number of unpublished compositions from his own archive. Compositions – including a Concert for violin and orchestra in d-minor - that at some point will have to be published.

== Compositions ==
- Transkriptionen (Studies) of the Lieder Du bist die Ruh, Der Lindenbaum and Am Meer for solo violin (1874/1887) by Franz Schubert (F.E.C. Leuckart, Leipzig)
- Rumänische Rhapsodie for violin und piano forte (Verlag: Paul Vogt)
- Liebesseligkeit after Emanuel Geibel (1892)
- Trauer after a poem by Nikolaus Lenau (1892)
- Reverie R.Sahla (Verlag: Nagel/Hannover)
- Schlummerliedchen for violin and piano (Schweers & Haake 1899)
- Wiegenlied for solo violin (for Richarda and Richard)
- Menuetto for Violine and piano forte in A-major, Dedicated to my lovely wife for Richard on 8. April 1900 (Gries & Schornnagel)
- Eine hab’ ich singen hören – poem by Fr. Rückert, set to music for voice and piano forte, Bückeburg 23. December 1891 (Nagel)
- Ballade- dedicated to Her Excellency Ingeborg von Bronsart. Bückeburg, November 1891 (C. F. Kahnt, Leipzig)
- 4 Compositions for violin and piano forte: Spanischer Tanz, Nocturno No.1 Nocturno No 2, (C. F. Kahnt 1904)
- Lieder after poem by Martha Grosse for voice and piano (1925): Wiegenlied, Eine Karte, Ein Ich, Traumvergessenheit (Ries & Erler)
- Georg Friedrich Händel – Siciliano. For violin accompanied by piano forte (Arr.: R.S., F.E.C. Leuckart)
- Zwei Gesänge for Alto with viola and piano forte by Johannes Brahms; arr. Richard Sahla (N. Simrock)

Diverse adaptions of Svenska Folkvisor
