= Wilhelm Middelschulte =

German organist and composer

- Born: April 3, 1863; Werve, Kreis Hamm, Kingdom of Prussia
- Died: May 4, 1943 (aged 80) Dortmund, Germany
- Genres: Classical
- Occupations: Organist, composer
- Instrument: Organ

Wilhelm Middelschulte (April 3, 1863, Werve, Kreis Hamm, now part of Kamen – May 4, 1943, Dortmund) was a German organist and composer who resided in America for most of his career.

== Life ==
Middelschulte initially studied organ with August Knabe. He later attended the Royal Academic Institute for Church Music, where he studied organ and theory with August Haupt. After briefly holding a position at the Royal Institute and acquiring a post at the St. Luke Church in Berlin, he moved to Chicago in 1891. In 1893, he gave three performances entirely from memory at the Columbian Exposition. From 1896 to 1918 he was organist for what would later become the Chicago Symphony Orchestra. During the 1920s, he regularly returned to his native Germany to give performances. He is regarded as one of the most significant organists of his time, and was critically acclaimed for his performances of Johann Sebastian Bach. In 1939, after nearly fifty years in America, Middelschulte returned to Germany, where he died only four years later.

His students included Virgil Fox and Cecilia Clare Bocard. See: List of music students by teacher: K to M#Wilhelm Middelschulte. Fox frequently used as an encore to his performances Middelschulte's "Perpetuum Mobile", an elaborate piece that builds from a subdued sound to, by the end, fortissimo and played almost entirely on the pedals; the penultimate measure contains an ascending scalar flourish and the last measure a single chord, both played on full organ.

Ferruccio Busoni's Fantasia contrappuntistica was dedicated to "Wilhelm Middelschulte, Meister der Kontrapunkte".
