= Indian Fantasy =

- Fantasy by Ferruccio Busoni
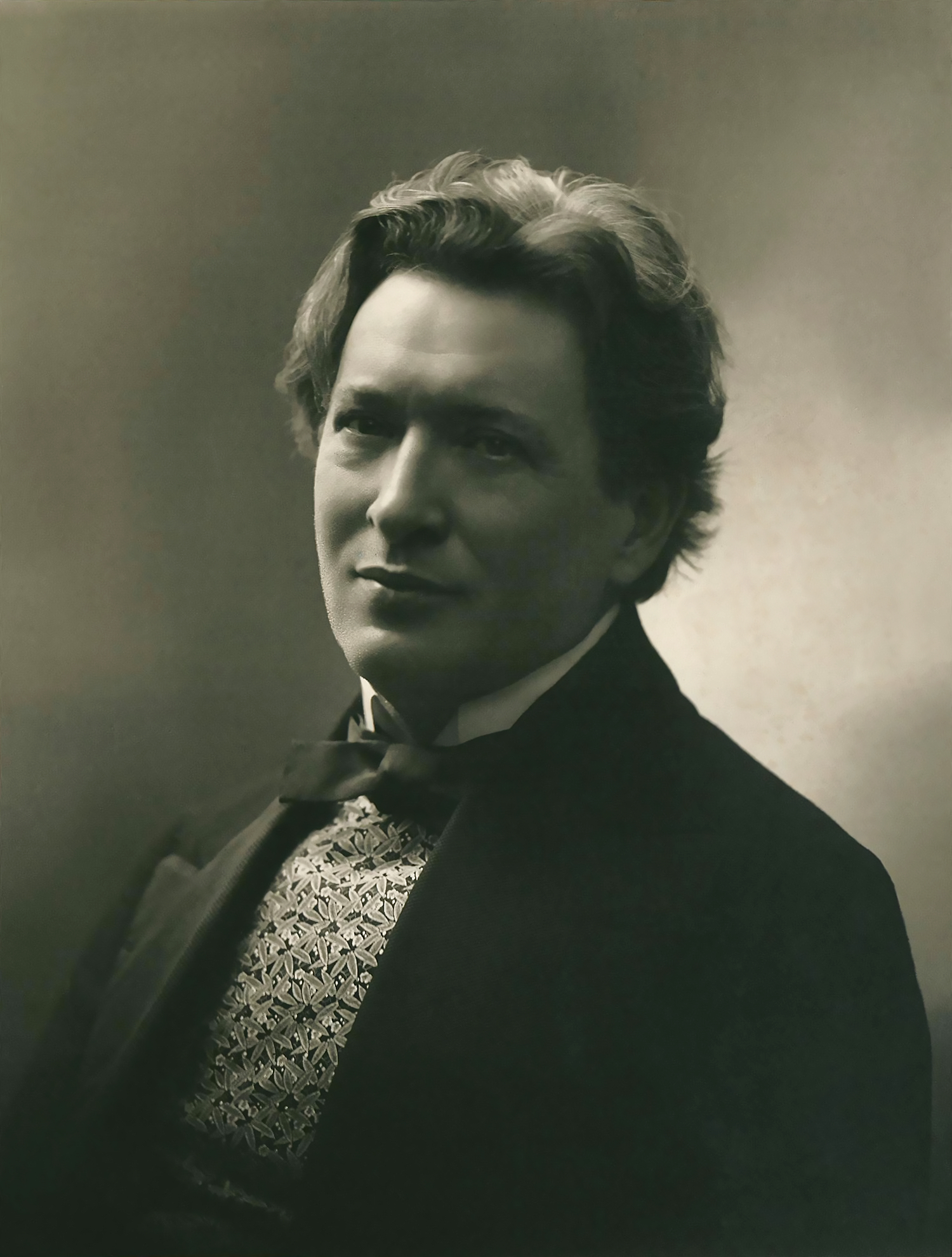
- The composer in 1913
- Native name: Indianische Fantasie
- Catalogue: BV 264
- Opus: 44
- Composed: 1913–14
- Performed: 1914: Berlin
- Movements: 3
- Scoring: piano; orchestra

The Indian Fantasy (Indianische Fantasie), Op. 44 (BV 264), is a fantasy for piano and orchestra by Ferruccio Busoni. Composed in 1913/14, it was first performed in Berlin in March 1914, with the composer as soloist. The piece is based on several melodies and rhythms from various American Indian tribes; Busoni had received them from American ethnomusicologist Natalie Curtis Burlin.

The fantasy describes the American prairie, and is in three movements:

1. Fantasy
2. Canzona
3. Finale
