= Die Brautwahl =

- Opera by Ferruccio Busoni
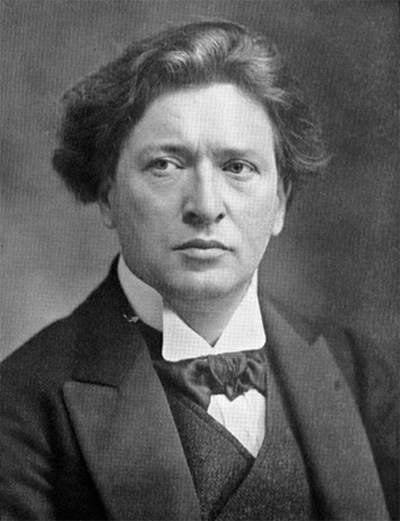
- The composer in 1906
- Librettist: Ferruccio Busoni
- Language: German
- Based on: Short story by E. T. A. Hoffmann
- Premiere: 12 April 1912; Stadttheater Hamburg

Die Brautwahl (The Bridal Choice) is a "comic-fantastic" opera in three acts and an epilogue by Ferruccio Busoni. The German libretto, by Busoni himself, is based on a short story by E. T. A. Hoffmann. Busoni began work on this, his first completed opera, in 1905.

Die Brautwahl was first performed at the Stadttheater Hamburg on 12 April 1912. It was not a success with audiences but its failure did not discourage the composer's ambition to write for the operatic stage.

== Roles ==
Roles, voice types, premiere cast
Role	Voice type	Premiere cast, 12 April 1912 Conductor: Gustav Brecher
Albertine	soprano	Elisabeth Schumann
Edmund Lehsen	tenor	Otto Marak
Dionysius Thusman	tenor	Wilhelm Birrenkoven
Bensch	tenor	Eduard Lichtenstein
Voswindel	baritone	Hermann Wiedemann
Leonhard	baritone	Robert vom Scheidt
Manasse	bass	Max Lohfing
Servant	tenor	Fritz Windgassen

== Synopsis ==
The artist Edmund is in love with Albertine but he has many rivals for her hand. These include the "revenant" Manasse, his son Baron Bensch and the bureaucrat Thusman. The "bridal choice" of the title is finally decided by a trial involving three caskets which Edmund wins.

== Recordings ==
- 1999: Siegfried Vogel, Carola Höhn, Graham Clark, Vinson Cole, Deutsche Oper Berlin Chorus, Staatskapelle Berlin, conducted by Daniel Barenboim (Teldec)
