= Wilhelm Mayer (composer) =

Austrian composer (1831–1898)

Wilhelm Mayer (10 June 1831 – 22 January 1898) was an Austro-Bohemian composer who published his works under the name W. A. Rémy. He was also a noted teacher, whose pupils included Ferruccio Busoni and Felix Weingartner. His name sometimes appears as Wilhelm Mayer-Rémy.

== Career ==
Wilhelm Mayer (some sources say his full name was Benjamin Wilhelm Mayer) was born in Prague, the son of a lawyer. He studied at the Prague Organ School in 1846. His overture to Eugène Sue's drama Jean Cavalier was written when he was 17, but his parents required him to enter the legal profession. He graduated as a doctor of law in 1856, when he was 25. He then occupied various posts in the Austro-Hungarian civil service.

In 1862 he took up music once again, becoming conductor of the Steiermärkischer Musikverein in Graz. During his eight-year stay in that post, he introduced a number of his own compositions, such as the overture Sardanapalus, the symphonic poem Helena, and a Symphony in F major. These three works were also presented in Leipzig.

After resigning as conductor in 1870, he devoted himself to composition and private teaching. He published his works under the name W. A. Rémy, an anagram of "W. Mayer". It has also been noted that the initials W. A. of his pseudonym are the same as those of Wolfgang Amadeus Mozart, his musical idol. Mayer focused on the music of Mozart and Johann Sebastian Bach, but greatly disliked Johannes Brahms and Richard Wagner. For him, the first four preludes and fugues from Book I of Bach's The Well-Tempered Clavier represented water, fire, earth and air respectively, and he conceived many others in a poetical light. He taught Luigi Cherubini's methods for counterpoint, and used Hector Berlioz's orchestral treatise.

Through his former pupil Wilhelm Kienzl's intercession with Ferruccio Busoni's father, Busoni studied harmony, counterpoint, orchestration and composition with Mayer from November 1879 to April 1881, being just 15 when he completed his formal studies with honours. Mayer taught Busoni that "the widest possible culture makes the artist", a motto Busoni wrote on his 430-page treatise on composition he had written out in longhand during his studies with Mayer and later transmitted to his own pupils. Busoni wrote a "Fugue in F major on a theme of W. A. Rémy" (BV 154), and dedicated his Praeludium (Basso ostinato) und Fuge (Doppelfuge zum Choral) Op. 7 (Op. 76), for organ (BV 157) to his teacher.

Mayer's other notable students included Felix Weingartner, Richard Heuberger, Emil von Reznicek, Richard Sahla, Marie Baumayer Josef Gauby and Friedrich von Hausegger.

As a teacher, Mayer was exacting, but also inspiring. His reputation extended throughout Europe. Emperor Franz Josef I awarded him the Knight's Cross of the Order of Franz Joseph, the only private music teacher ever so honoured.

Mayer married and had a daughter, Melanie. He died in Graz in 1898, aged 66. His former student Ferruccio Busoni wrote a tribute to him in the Allgemeine musikalische Zeitung.

== Works ==
- 5 symphonies
- Das Waldfräulein, concert opera (Graz, 1876)
- Sardanapalus, overture
- Helena, symphonic poem
- Phantasiestuck, orchestra (given at the Vienna Philharmonic concerts under Felix Otto Dessoff
- Slawischer Liederspiel, solo voices, 2 pianos and chorus
- Östlicher Rosen, solo voices, 2 pianos and chorus
- chamber music
- songs
