= Étude Op. 10, No. 2 (Chopin) =

Piano étude by Frédéric Chopin

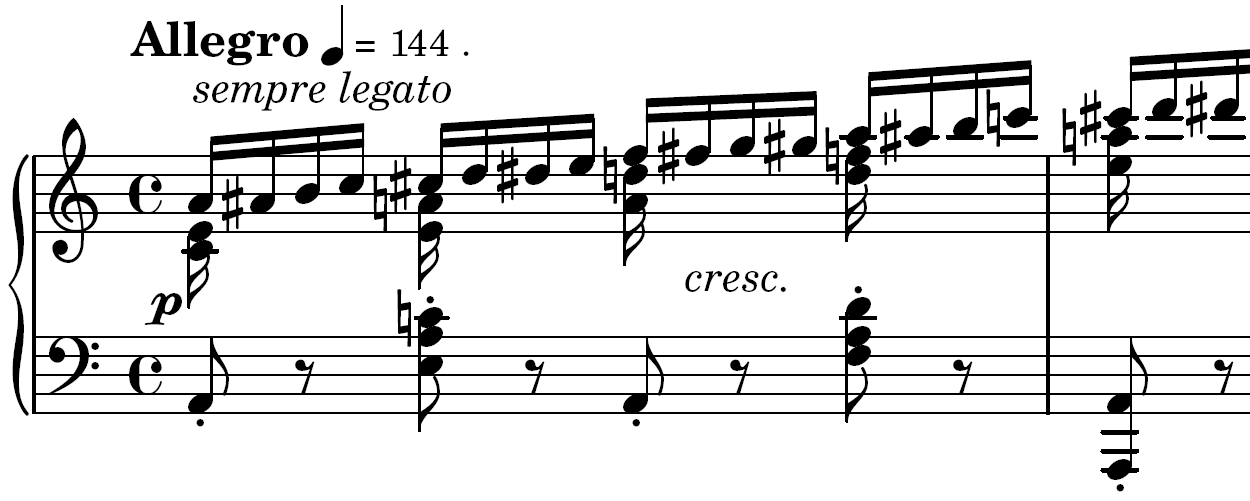
Étude Op. 10, No. 2 incipit

Étude Op. 10, No. 2, in A minor, is a technical study composed by Frédéric Chopin for the piano. Composed in November 1829, it was first published in 1833 in France, Germany, and England. This étude is an exercise in developing the independence of the weaker (3rd, 4th, and 5th) fingers of the right hand by playing rapid chromatic scales up and down the keyboard. Meanwhile, the first two fingers of the right and the left hand play an accompaniment of short intervals and single notes. Chopin indicated the fingering himself note by note for almost 800 notes.

== Structure and stylistic traits ==
Étude Op. 10 No. 2
Martha Goldstein playing on an Érard (1851)

The melody consists of rapid chromatic scale figures played by the outer right-hand fingers, accompanied by chord attacks. Like most of Chopin's other études, this work is in ternary form A–B–A. The harmonic scheme of the A section is relatively simple, with A minor, E major, A minor, but the chromatic scale and the exotic clash of its C♯s with the A minor chords tend to veil the clarity of A minor and create a mysterious sound effect further increased by the Neapolitan chord, bar 15. The middle section brings a dramatic increase with the dynamic climax exactly in the center of the piece, bar 25. This climax is approached by stepwise rising two-bar sequences from F major to A minor via G minor. The final dominant seventh chord of each sequence leads to the next one by means of a deceptive cadence. The longer and asymmetric second part of the B section, leading back to the restatement of the A section, uses a similar harmonic progression but shorter sequences. The final A section is a quite literal though shortened restatement of the first one ending with a coda of a rising and falling scale into a Picardy ending.

Chopin demanded that the chromatic scale be played sempre legato, a direction mentioned seven times throughout the score. This contrasts with the staccato chords played as accompaniment.

A copy by Józef Linowski of Chopin's autograph reads cut time (alla breve) for No. 2, but this seems to have been overlooked. The original (first French, German, and English) editions have common time. Chopin's metronome marking for the piece is = 144 referring to quarter notes. Later editors have followed Chopin in this regard with the exception of Hans von Bülow who suggests = 114.

== Character ==
Musicologist Hugo Leichtentritt (1874–1951) calls the étude a "moto perpetuo". The transparent texture of nonstop semiquavers accompanied by a light "dancing" bass has its forerunners in Bach's Prelude No. 5 in D major (BWV 850) from the first book of The Well-Tempered Clavier and resembles other virtuoso pieces from around 1830 such as Paganini's Moto Perpetuo for violin and piano. In Robert Schumann's substantial 1836 Neue Zeitschrift für Musik article on piano études, all Chopin Études Op. 10 are awarded an asterisk (*) for "poetic character" except No. 2. But Leichtentritt describes its sound effect as the "murmuring and blowing of a gentle wind", French pianist Alfred Cortot (1877–1962) mentions its "gliding and vaporous character" and Alfredo Casella talks about a "character of swift, aerial and unsubstantial mysteriousness". The American music critic James Huneker (1857–1921) writes that "the entire composition, with its murmuring, meandering, chromatic character, is a forerunner to the whispering, weaving, moonlit effects in some of [Chopin's] later studies".

== Technical difficulties ==
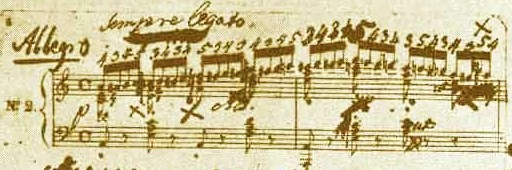
Proof sheet of Étude Op. 10, No. 2 with fingerings in Chopin's handwriting, c. 1833

The technical novelty of this étude is the chromatic scale to be played by the three outer fingers of the right hand together with short semiquaver notes to be played by the first and second fingers of the same hand and the difficulty is to do this evenly in piano and legato at the required tempo of M.M. 144. Other piano composers before Chopin, such as Ignaz Moscheles (1794–1870) in his Études Op. 70, have introduced chromatic scales with accompanying notes to be played by the same hand. But the chromatic scale is never given to the "weak" fingers. Leichtentritt believes that Chopin in this étude revives an old fingering habit (that of not using the thumb) from the pre-Bach clavichord time of the 17th century which had already long been regarded as obsolete. The technical significance of this étude for Chopin is proved by the extensiveness of his fingerings, an effort he did not apply to any other piece. An analysis of Chopin's fingering reveals that, like in the "standard" chromatic scale fingering, the middle finger plays the black keys, the index finger, which "normally" plays C and F, is replaced by the little finger. The thumb, usually playing all other white keys, is replaced by the ring finger. While it is fairly easy to cross the long middle finger over the short thumb, acrobatic dexterity is required to cross the middle finger over the ring finger. An obvious way to proceed is straightening the middle while bending the ring and little fingers.

Cortot (1877–1962) states that the first difficulty to overcome is the "crossings of the 3rd, 4th and 5th fingers" and the "strain resulting from the continuous action of the said fingers". Preparatory exercises introduced by Cortot, Gottfried Galston (1879–1950) and Casella always commence with the chromatic scale (top voice) alone without the filling voice. Cortot divides the hand into an "active element" and an "accompanying element". He first insists on practicing chromatic scales with the three outer fingers in all permutations. Galston recommends to hold and press a little object with the thumb and index finger while playing the chromatic semiquavers with the other fingers. Cortot recommends the "pizzicato" notes to be "plucked rather than struck" and Casella compares the three outer fingers to a "motorcycle dragging along its own sidecar [the first two fingers]". Australian pianist Alan Kogosowski (born 1952) recommends keeping 1 and 2 completely relaxed while playing the top voice alone: The "little two-note chords on each beat in the right hand" should be released "as soon as they've been played". The thumb should not be operated vertically to avoid strain and "play its notes extremely lightly –becoming as light as a feather, almost as if it is hardly there at all". Von Bülow orders "the middle harmonies to be played throughout distinctly, and yet transiently [flüchtig]". Galston suggests to accentuate all the upper notes of the two-note chords (played by the 2nd finger) while practicing the right hand.

It is a particular physical and psychological challenge to perform this étude in public and especially after the Op. 10, No. 1 with its enormous stretches. Kogosowski reports that even "the imposingly powerful Sviatoslav Richter, who possessed the most awesome technical equipment of any pianist in the world, would quake before this tiny piece. When performing the twelve Études Op. 10 as a set, he'd hesitate and sometimes skip over the quiet but treacherous second Étude. And Richter was certainly not the only pianist to feel this way about this little Étude." Gottfried Galston believes that "he who wants to perform at Chopin's tempo (MM 144) has to be able to control it at home (German: im Kämmerlein) at MM 152, or MM 160".

== Paraphrases and arrangements ==
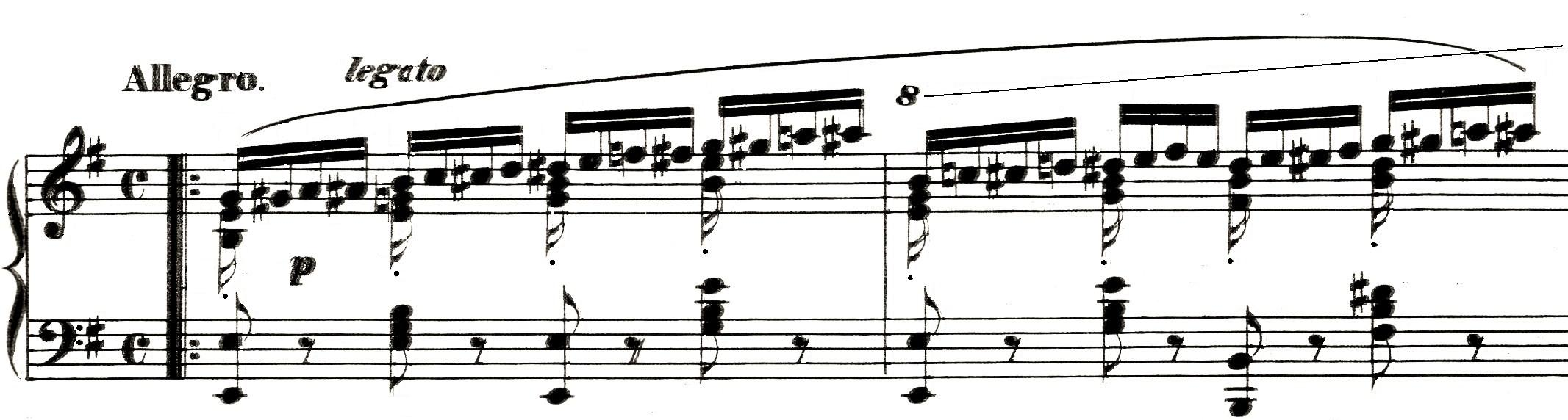
Opening of Czerny's Étude Op. 365 No. 19, first published in 1836

Three years after the publication of Chopin's Études Op. 10 Carl Czerny who had frequently entertained Chopin at his Viennese home, 1829, included a study in his Schule des Virtuosen, 1836, that begins like a parody of Chopin's Op. 10 No. 2. In the course of this study the chromatic scale and the two-note accompaniment chords appear in all kinds of permutations given to the right to the left and to both hands simultaneously. Busoni in his Klavierübung introduces an extensive exercise, somewhat reminiscent of this. An exercise in double notes is included. Leopold Godowsky's 53 Studies on Chopin's Études include two versions. The first one is for the left hand alone while the popular second one, Ignis Fatuus (will-o'-the-wisp), is an exercise in polyrhythm superimposing Chopin's right-hand part transposed to the left hand with triplet two-note chords in the right hand. The result sounds much faster than the actual tempo which is M.M. 120–132. German pianist Friedrich Wührer's version resembles Godowsky's first one but with an accompaniment in the right hand. In his Triple Étude (after Chopin) from 1992, Canadian pianist Marc-André Hamelin combines Chopin's Étude Op. 10 No. 2 with Chopin's other A minor études, Op. 25 No. 4 and Op. 25 No. 11, trying to emulate Godowsky whose triple version has been lost. Scottish composer Alistair Hinton likewise combines Chopin's A minor Études Op. 10 No. 2 and Op. 25 No. 11 in his Étude en forme de Chopin Op. 26.

The étude has been transcribed for clarinet and piano by Ivan Butirsky.

== Notes ==
Sources

- Cortot, Alfred (1915). Frédéric Chopin. 12 Études, op. 10. Édition de travail des oeuvres de Chopin (in French). Paris: Éditions Salabert.
- Leichtentritt, Hugo (1922). "Die Etüden". Analyse der Chopin'schen Klavierwerke [Analysis of Chopin's Piano Works] (in German). Vol. II. Berlin: Max Hesses Verlag.
