= Klavierübung (Busoni) =

Piano composition compilation by Ferruccio Busoni

- Piano tutorial by Ferruccio Busoni
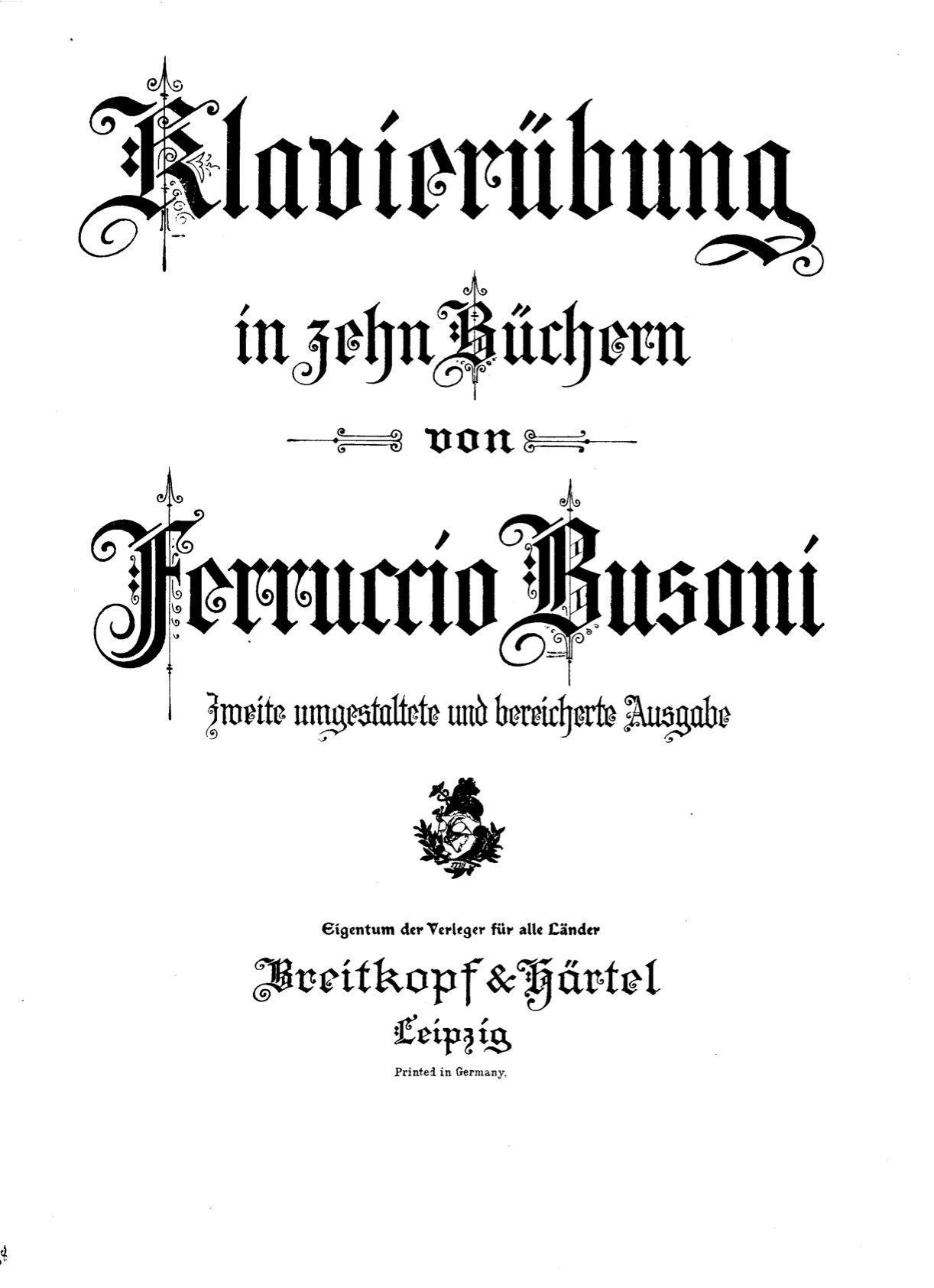
- Title page of the edition in ten volumes
- Catalogue: BV A 3
- Composed: 1917–24

The Klavierübung (Piano Tutorial, BV A 3), by the Italian pianist and composer Ferruccio Busoni, is a compilation of piano exercises and practice pieces, comprising transcriptions of works by other composers and original compositions of his own.

Busoni worked on the Klavierübung at various times during the last seven years of his life, and with it, he hoped to pass on his accumulated knowledge of keyboard technique. The Klavierübung is not a comprehensive or systematic graduated course of study, nor is it intended for beginning or intermediate students. Instead it assumes the student has mastered standard piano technique and has reached a virtuoso level. Busoni proceeds by adding refinements, short cuts, and unusual solutions for pianistic problems encountered in a performing artist's repertoire. The included exercises and examples reflect Busoni's own special, but diverse, interests and abilities.

== Assessment ==
Edward J. Dent, author of the first definitive biography of Busoni, had this to say about the exercises and studies in the Klavierübung: "...they are all extraordinarily interesting and stimulating. They are interesting too as helping to elucidate some of Busoni's other compositions, for the studies show how certain of his harmonic devices grew out of purely pianistic principles based on definite positions of the hands on the keyboard. Every one of the studies has genuine musical originality, and even the exercises to be repeated in all keys are a good deal more musical than such forms of torture are generally made to be."

== Publication of the first edition ==
The Klavierübung was first published by Breitkopf & Härtel in separate parts beginning in 1918. Part 2 appeared in 1919, and parts 3 and 4 two years later. The fifth, and what was to be the final part, appeared in 1922. Kindermann, who prepared the first extensive catalog of Busoni's works in 1980, refers to this "First Edition" as Klavierübung in fünf Teilen [Piano Tutorial in Five Parts], and Breitkopf & Härtel later republished a collected edition under this name ca. 1996.

== Original plan of the work ==
Part 1 (Sechs Klavierübungen und Präludien) consists of six tutorials (numbered I - VI). Tutorials I to V were written in three days (10–12 September 1917), and tutorial VI one month later. The first piece of Part 2 was written on 7 November 1917, and the remainder from 4 to 10 June 1918. It consists of three tutorials (VII to IX).

Each tutorial begins with exercises and moves on to short original pieces and adaptions or transcriptions of excerpts from the repertory. For instance, the first tutorial starts with traditional scales (although the fingerings are unorthodox), then adds two excerpts which require power and speed: the first is from Liszt's Totentanz, and the second is based on two bars in Busoni's "Turandots Frauengemach" [Turandot's Bedchamber] (Book 4 from Elegien, BV 249). This is followed by two original compositions: a 16-bar "Tempo di Valse" and a 33-bar "Preludio," both of which emphasize legato scales at moderate speed. Busoni frequently lists at the bottom one or more pieces from the repertoire as examples (in German: Beispiele) suitable for further study. In the case of the "Preludio," the Beispiel is Alkan's first etude from Etudes dans tous les tons majeurs, (Op. 35).

The first tutorial exemplifies a blueprint which is used for the subsequent tutorials, each emphasizing a different aspect of piano technique. These include, in addition to the "simple" scales of the first tutorial: forms derived from scales (chords incorporated into scales); chromatic "sliding-finger" (or "sixth-finger") technique; repeated notes; arpeggios and broken chords; examples of "three-hands"; trills; examples with arpeggios; and further examples of "three hands."

== Difficulties completing ==
Because of distractions, including ill health, and other concerns, not least being the work on his lifelong masterpiece, the opera Doktor Faust (unfinished at the time of his death in 1924), many planned components of the Klavierübung were delayed or never fully realized. For instance, the foreword was not written until July 1920, and did not appear until the publication of Part 3 in 1921. Part 2 contains material which should have been included in Part 1, in tutorials V [arpeggios] and VI ["for three hands"]. Part 3 presents additional material appropriate to Part 1, as appendices. A "Chromaticon" for Part 4, mentioned in a footnote to the foreword, had to be abandoned, and was hurriedly replaced with his edition of Eight Etudes by Cramer (BV B 53) first published in 1897. Part 5 likewise consists of already existing pieces. Perhaps, if Busoni had lived longer, he would have included much more. For example, there are no tutorials on the very important technique of pedalling, for which he was particularly well known.

== Publication of a second edition ==
From December 1923 to January 1924 Busoni did manage to reorganize and enrich the material for a second edition of 284 pages. Entitled Klavierübung in zehn Büchern [Piano Tutorial in Ten Books], it was published posthumously in 1925 as Volume VIII of the Bach-Busoni Edition. Only a small number of copies of the second edition were printed, and until recently, it has been a major rarity. Fortunately, it is now available online (see, for example, this page at the International Music Score Library Project).

== Significance of the second edition ==
The second edition is particularly important, since it contains all Busoni's last piano compositions. Two of these are not found elsewhere and are of special interest, since they were intended as source material for the unfinished final scene of Doktor Faust:

1. "Veloce e leggiero" [the final piece in Book 5 ("Trills")]
2. "Study for the Third Pedal" [No.7 from Seven Short Pieces for the Cultivation of Polyphonic Playing, Book 9]

== Annotated listing of contents ==
Busoni did not typically disclose the source of the extracts on which he based many of the pieces in the Klavierübung. They are often simply titled, for example, "Nach Bach" or "Nach Schubert." Fortunately, both Beaumont and Sitsky have provided fairly detailed descriptions of the contents of both the first and second editions. Some of this information is inserted here as annotations between square brackets.

=== Klavierübung in Five Parts (First Edition) ===
Klavierübung in fünf Teilen

==== Part 1: Six Piano Tutorials and Preludes ====
Sechs Klavierübungen und Präludien (der Klavierübung erster Teil.) (score)

I. [Scales]
[exercises and pieces employing unusual and unorthodox fingerings: the thumb passing under the fifth finger; the fifth finger passing over the thumb; or not using the thumb at all]

[The following two sections, (a) and (b), also appear in the Second Edition, Book 1 (Scales)]
(a) Presto, pp. 3-4.

[4 exercises using the thumb; 3 exercises not using the thumb]

(b) [2 exercises with hands in contrary motion], pp. 4-5.

[The following three sections, (c) to (e), are omitted in the Second Edition.]
(c) (Nach Liszt.) Allegro, p. 5.

[excerpt from the final cadenza in Liszt's Totentanz, see p. 70 of the Liszt score (Sitsky, p. 166)
[Busoni also published an edition of Totentanz, BV B 72, which is based on an earlier manuscript of Liszt's and includes a De Profundis section.] (Sitsky, pp. 226-230)

(d) Allegretto, p. 6.

[scales in alternating hands, broken chords in the other hand]
[based on two measures from the final page of Turandot's Frauengemach, No.4 from Busoni's Elegien, BV 249 (score)] (Beaumont, p. 303)

(e) Tempo di Valse, p. 6.

(f) Preludio. Allegro [in E major], p. 7.

[This piece also appears in the Second Edition, Book 9, as No.1 in Sieben kurze Stücke zur Pflege des polyphonen Spiels.]
Beispiel: Alkan, Etudes dans tous les tons majeurs, [Op. 35] No.1 (score)

II. [Chords based on scale patterns]
[step-wise movement with incorporated chords]
[Tutorial II also appears in the Second Edition, Book 2 (Forms derived from scales), section (a)]

(a) [Extended exercise], pp. 8-9.

Beispiele: Weber, Sonate C dur, [Op. 24] I. [Allegro] (score)

Liszt, Carillon, aus "der Weihnachtsbaum" [S.186/6] (score)

(b) Preludio: Allegro festivo, p. 10.

[begins in D♭ major and ends in C major]
Beispiel: Chopin, Fantasie [Op. 49] (score)

III. [Chromatic "sliding-finger" technique]
["sixth finger" technique of sliding from black to white key in chromatic passages]
[Tutorial III also appears in the Second Edition, Book 2 (Forms derived from scales), section (b)]

(a) [7 exercises on various double chromatics], pp. 11-12.
(b) Preludio (Andantino), pp. 12-13.
(c) Con bravura (la mano destra sotto), p. 13.

[alternating crossing hands: sliding one, two, three, four fingers simultaneously; both hands, similar motion, outer fingers held, inner sliding]
Beispiel: Liszt, Mazeppa (S.139/4) (score)

(d) Preludio (Tempo di Valse moderato), p. 14.
(e) Allegro moderato [exercise, in 6/8], pp. 14-15.

IV. [Repeated notes]
[Tutorial IV also appears in the Second Edition, Book 2 (Forms derived from scales), section (c)]

(a) Schema with eight variants, pp. 16-18.

[repeated note techniques, in various patterns of quarter, triplet, and sixteenth notes]

(b) (Nach Schubert-Liszt), p. 18

[excerpt from Auf dem Wasser zu singen, tr. Liszt, 12 Lieder von Franz Schubert, S.558/2 (score)] (Sitsky, p 243)
Beispiele: Chopin, Prelude Gis moll [in G♯ minor, Op.28, No.12]. (score)

Liszt, Schuberts "Auf dem Wasser zu Singen" [S.558/2]. (score)
Liszt, Au bord d'une source. (S.160/4) (score)
Liszt, Tannhäuser-Ouverture. (S.442 (score)

(c) Allegretto, p. 19.

[based on bars 11 and 12 of the Indian Diary BV 267, No.1] (Sitsky, p 243)
Beispiel: Busoni, Indianisches Tagebuch, Nr. 2. (score)

(d) (Nach Auber-Liszt) Alla Tarantella., pp. 20-21.

[excerpt from Tarantelle di bravura dàprès la Tarantelle de La muette de Portici, S.386] (Sitsky, p 243)
Beispiel: Liszt, Tarantella di Bravura sur "la Muette de Portici". (score)

V. [Arpeggios (broken chords)]
[Tutorial V also appears in the Second Edition, Book 3 (broken chords), sections (a) - (i)]

(a) [5 arpeggio exercises, thumb and fifth finger passing over and under each other], pp. 22-23.

(b) Prestissimo; stretto, pp. 23-25.

[4 extension arpeggio exercises]
Beispiele: Chopin, Etude Op. 10 Nr. 1. (für die r. H.) (score)

Henselt, "Orage, tu ne saurais m'abattre". (für die l. H.) [12 Études caractéristiques, Op. 2, No.1] (score)
Chopin, Prélude Es dur. [Op. 28, No.19] (score)
Liszt, Vision. [S.139/6] (score)
Bach-Busoni, Wohltemperiertes Klavier I, Varianten zu den Präludien in D moll und B dur [Nos.6 & 21[ (score)

(c) (Nach Bach), p. 25.

[exercise based on Prelude No.1, BWV 846, from the Well-Tempered Clavier, Book I] (Sitsky, p 203)

(d) [see Part 3, section (m) "Appendix to tutorial V."]

(e) (Nach Beethoven). Allegretto, pp. 26-27.

[exercise based an excerpt of the Waldstein sonata (beginning at bar 344 of the Rondo; score).] (Sitsky, p 278)

(f) [Contrary motion extension study], p. 28.

[this exercise includes some big stretches](Sitsky, p 167

(g) Allegro vivace, p. 29.

[contrary-similar motion combined]

(h) [Extended broken octaves], pp. 30-31.

Beispiele: (for die linke Hand) Rubinstein Etüde Es dur, 6 Etudes, Op. 23, No.4 in E♭ major (score)

Busoni, Indianisches Tagebuch, No.4. (score)

(i) Preludio. Allegro moderato, pp. 32-33.

["Rather charming...in 3/2, with stretches in both hands."] (Sitsky, p 267)

VI. [Examples of "À trois mains"]
[Tutorial VI also appears in the Second Edition, Book 4 "For Three Hands" as sections (a) - (c)]
[Piano music "à trois mains" ("for three hands") combines three musical lines (written on three staves), which sounds as though it is played by three hands, but nevertheless is actually played by two.]

(a) Preludio. Alla Tarantella, pp. 34-35.

[short piece based on the middle (Allegro) section of All'Italia (no.2) from Elegien, BV 249] (score)
Beispiel: Liszt, Norma-Fantasie. [Réminiscences de Norma, S.394] (score)

(b) Nach Offenbach. Barcarole, pp. 36-37.

[transcription (score) of the Barcarole from the Tales of Hoffmann] (Sitsky, p 289; Beaumont, p. 303)

(c) Nach Beethoven. Presto, pp. 38-39.

[excerpt from the fifth movement of the C♯ minor Quartet Op. 131 (score), transcribed for piano; consists of the first 24 bars, jumps to the fermata at bar 45 and proceeds to the cadence at the beginning of the first ending at bar 66] (Sitsky, p 278)
Beispiele: Schubert-Liszt, Das Sterbeglöcklein.

[Schubert song, D.871, transcribed for solo piano]
[No.3 from Liszt's Sechs Melodien (6 Melodies), S.563]

Liszt, Valse a capriccio sur Lucia e Parisina (Erste Fassung) [S.401]
Busoni, Concerto (score)

==== Part 2: Three Piano Tutorials and Preludes ====
Drei Klavierübungen und Präludien (der Klavierübung zweiter Teil.) (score)

VII. [Trills]
[Tutorial VII also appears in the Second Edition, Book 5 "Trills", sections (a) to (g).]

(a) Moderato, pp. 2-4.

[3 extended exercises in trills, forming one "preludio"]

(b) Nach Bach. Andante, pp. 5-7.

[Variation 28 from Goldberg Variations, BV B 35 (score)] (Sitsky, p 203)
Beispiele: Beethovens Sonaten Op. 53 (score), Op. 109 (score) und Op. 111 (score).

(c) Nach Beethoven. Allegro, pp. 8-9.

[based on part of the fugue from the 'Hammerklavier' Sonata, Op. 106]
[The trills are written out and fitted with the other parts.] (Sitsky, pp. 278-279)
Beispiel: Vergleiche die ganze Fuge aus Beethovens Sonate Op. 106. (score)

(d) Preludio (ohne den 3. Finger [without the third finger]). Moderato alla breve, pp. 10-11.

Beispiele: ^{1)} ohne den 4. Finger: Chopin, Etudes Op. 25 F dur [No.3] (score),

ohne den 3. und 4. Finger: Chopin, Etudes Op. 10 As dur [No.10] (score).
^{2)} für die wechselnden Sekunden intervalle: Liszt's "Feux Follets" [Transcendental Etude No.5, S.139/5 (score)]

(e) Nach Gounod. Andante con moto, pp. 12-14.

[Busoni cadenza to Liszt-Gounod Valse de l'Opera Faust, S.407]
[begins at bar 24 of the Andantino (p. 9) of the Liszt score
[The Andantino section is based on the vision of Gretchen from Act 1.] (Beaumont, p. 303)
[Egon Petri's recording of this piece uses the Busoni cadenza.] (Sitsky, p. 240)
[4 measures for returning from Busoni's cadenza to the "Allegro vivace assai" of the Faust Waltz are provided by Sitsky on p 242.]
Beispiele: Faust-Walzer (score)

Die Vogelpredigt [S.175/1] (score)
Gondoliera [S.162/1] aus: Venezia e Napoli (Liszt) (score)

(f) Preludio. Allegro, pp. 15-17.

["an effective preludio...with straightforward trill decoration running through it"] (Sitsky, p 168)

(g) Nach Liszt. Andantino, pp. 18-21.

[theme from Gondoliera (from Liszt's Venezia e Napoli], score) with 3 variations] (Sitsky, p 243)

VIII. [Examples with arpeggios]
[Tutorial VIII also appears in the Second Edition, Book 3 "Chordal (broken chords)", sections (j) to (l).]

(a) Nach Beethoven. Allegro, pp. 22-23.

[exercise based on a 2-bar excerpt from the 4th movement of Sonata, Op. 26 (with six example variants)] (Sitsky, p 278; Beaumont, p. 303)
Beispiel: Sonate Op. 26. [Sonata No.12 "Funeral March"] (score)
Beispiel: Alkan, Etudes dans les tons majeurs: C dur Stück. [Op. 35, No.4] (score)

(b) Preludio. Andante tranquillo, pp. 24-25.

[excerpt based on Busoni's Improvisation on "Wie wohl ist mir" for two pianos (BV 271; score), beginning at bar 10] (Beaumont, p. 303)

(c) Tempo di Valse, elegantemente, pp. 26-29.

[After 2 bars of introduction the piece is essentially identical to the 28-bar Intermezzo in A♭ major from Busoni's Fourth Ballet Scene (first version of 1892, BV 238; score); it then modulates into a new 24-bar middle section, and finally returns to A♭ major in the 19-bar conclusion.] (Beaumont, p. 303)
Beispiele: Chopin, Prélude Fis moll. [Prelude in F♯ minor, Op.28, No.8] (score)

Liszt, Waldesrauschen (S.145, No.1) (score)
Liszt, Dante-Sonate, Mittelsatz. [S.167, No.7] (score)

IX. A second group for tutorial VI ["three hands"]
[Tutorial IX also appears in the Second Edition, Book 4 "For Three Hands", sections (d) to (f).]

(a) Perpetuum mobile et infinitum. Studie nach Bach (aus "an die Jugend"). Allegro non troppo, pp. 30-31.

[An endlessly repeating 24-bar loop extracted from the "Fuga figurata" of Book 2 of Busoni's An die Jugend, BV 254 (score). The piece combines themes from the prelude and the fugue of Bach's Prelude and Fugue No.5 in D major (BWV 850) from the Well-Tempered Clavier, Book 1 (score)]

(b) Nach Schubert, pp. 32-33.

[16-bar excerpt beginning just before bar 57 of Liszt's transcription of Schubert's song Erlkönig in 12 Lieder von Franz Schubert, S.558/4 (score)] (Sitsky, p 293)

(c) Aus meinem "Concerto". Trattenuto e fantasticamente, pp. 34-35.

[excerpt, from the 2nd movement of Busoni's Concerto Op. XXXIX, BV 247, p. 45 of the Egon Petri two-piano reduction

==== Part 3: Staccato ====
Lo Staccato. (der Klavierübung dritter Teil.) (score)

[The following sections (a) to (j), also appear in the Second Edition, Book 6 "Staccato".]
(a) An die Musikschule und das Konservatorium zu Basel, p. 3
[To the Music School and Conservatory of Basel]

[Foreword by Ferruccio Busoni, dated Zurich, July 1920.]

(b) Vivace Moderato, con precisione, pp. 4-7.

["...hectic and difficult study in staccato chords...."] (Sitsky, p 169)

(c) Variations-Studie nach Mozart, 1, pp. 8-9.

[transcription (score) of the "Serenade" from Don Giovanni]
[This piece was played frequently by Egon Petri as an encore.] (Sitsky, p 264)

(d) Variations-Studie nach Mozart, 2, pp. 10-15.

[slightly altered versions the Giga and Variazione from Book 3 of An die Jugend, BV 254 (score); the Bolero is cut] (Sitsky, pp. 264-266)

(e) Motive. Allegro risoluto, pp. 16-18.

[staccato study with alternating-hands]
["a sequential study employing various intervals, including bars of consecutive seconds"] (Sitsky, p. 169)

(f) Preludio. Quasi presto, arditamente, pp. 19-21.

[Preludio from Busoni's Toccata, BV 287 (score)]

(g) Nach Mendelssohn. Vivace assai, pp. 22-23.

[transcription of the Presto from the Mendelssohn-Liszt Wedding March & Elfin Chorus, S.410 (score)] (Sitsky, p 243)

(h) Nach Bizet. Allegro deciso, pp. 24-25.

[consists of the first 68-bars of Busoni's Kammer Fantasie über Carmen, BV 284 (score) with 6-bars added to provide an ending] (Sitsky, p 279)

(i) Allegro, pp. 26-29.

"...another fierce-looking study in staccato chords...." (Sitsky, p 170)
Beispiele: Weber, Momento capriccioso (score)

Schumann, Toccata (score)
Rubinstein, Etüde C dur [Op.23, No.2] (score)
Mozart-Liszt, Don Juan-Fantasie, Finale (Ausgabe Busoni) (score)
Liszt, La Campanella (Ausgabe Busoni) (score)
Liszt, Galop chromatique
Liszt, Tarantella di Bravura (score)
Alkan, Etüde majeur No.12 (score)
Cramer-Busoni, Etüden, II. Heft (score)
Busoni, Fugen-Etüde, Op. 16 [No.5] (score)
Busoni, Turandots Frauengemach (BV 249, No.4] (score)
Busoni, Indianisches Tagebuch, Nr. 2. [BV 267, No.2] (score)
Busoni, IV. Ballet-Szene (Galopp). [BV 238a, No.2] (score)

(j) Transcriptions-Studie nach Liszt. Quasi Galopp, sempre da Capo, pp. 30-31.

[60-bar indefinitely repeating excerpt from Busoni's piano transcription of Liszt's Mephisto Waltz for orchestra (S.110), BV B 61 (beginning on p. 27 of the complete score)] (Sitsky, p 243)

[The following two sections (k) and (l) also appear in the Second Edition, Book 10 "Etudes after Paganini-Liszt".]
(k) Variations-Studie nach Paganini-Liszt, 1. [Vivo], pp.32-36.

[Busoni's concert transcription of Liszt's Paganini Etude No.4 "Arpeggio," BV B 74 (score). In this edition the Liszt version is omitted, and the original tempo indication "Vivo" was inadvertently removed.] (Sitsky, p 243)

(l) Variations-Studie nach Paganini-Liszt, 2. Vivace moderato tutto staccato, pp. 37-44.

[Busoni's concert transcription of Liszt's Paganini Etude No.6 "Thema mit Variationen," BV B 67 (score). This transcription was first published by Breitkopf & Härtel in 1914. That edition includes the two Liszt versions printed on staves above Busoni's transcription, and the Paganini original, below. In this edition the Liszt and Paganini versions are omitted.]

[The following section (m) also appears in the Second Edition, Book 3 "Chordal (broken chords" as section (d).]
(m) Nachsatz zur V. Übung. [Appendix to tutorial V.], pp. 45-46.

[6 further arpeggio exercises]
["chains of all types of 7th chords and their derivatives"] (Sitsky, p. 167)

(n) Anhang. 7 Variationen nach einem Motiv von Beethoven, p. 47.
[Appendix: Seven variations on a motive of Beethoven.]

[Footnote:] In verschiedenen Tonarten zu üben. Auch in Moll. [To be practiced in different keys. Also in minor.]
[The motive is from the coda of the first movement of the 'Emperor' concerto (score)]

==== Part 4: Eight Etudes by Cramer ====
Acht Etüden von Cramer (der Klavierübung vierter Teil.) (score)

[Busoni's edition of the Cramer etudes was originally published in 1897 by Schlesinger (BV B 53). That edition is faithful to the originals, except the slow introduction of No.5 is omitted, and suggested changes to Etudes 4 to 8 are indicated with ossias. The etudes were republished in this edition of the Klavierübung without alteration. They are also included in the Second Edition, Book 7, but the versions of Etudes 4 to 8 in that edition include the ossias in the text without notification and contain musical and pianistic changes as well.] (Sitsky, p 284)

I. Legato, pp. 2-18.

1. Allegro non tanto
2. Comodo. Behaglich
3. En Carillon: Moderato
4. Allegro di Bravura

II. Staccato, pp. 19-35.

5. Répétition: Allegrissimo
6. Allegro moderato
7. Scherzando: Piùttosto moderato
8. Finale: Molto agitato quasi presto

==== Part 5: Variations. Perpetual motion. Scales. ====
Variationen - Perpetuum mobile - Tonleitern (der Klavierübung fünfter Teil) (score)

[The following two sections (a) and (b) also appear in the Second Edition, Book 8 "Variations and Variants on Chopin"]

(a) Zehn Variationen über ein Präludium von Chopin, pp. 2-22.
[Ten Variations on a Prelude by Chopin] (score)

[Variations on the Prelude in C minor, Op.28, No.20 (Chopin score). The Ten Variations were also published separately as catalog no. EB 5230 (BV 213a). The variations are played continuously; they are not numbered in the score, but are numbered here according to Sitsky (pp. 56-58).]

(1) Sostenuto [Introduction]
(2) Largo [Chopin Prelude]
(3) [var. 1] Sostenuto (alla breve)
(4) [var. 2] Poco più vivo, leggiero scherzoso
(5) [var. 3] (En Carillon)
(6) [var. 4] continuando. dolce
(7) [var. 5] Sotto voce e poi sempre aumentando
(8) [var. 6] [no marking, begins on p. 10, 4th beat of first measure]
(9) [var. 7] Fantasia: Tempo libero. - Andante. [2 bars] - Tempo libero. - Presto.
(10) [var. 8] [begins at the second bar of the "Allegro deciso"; 6 measures serving as introduction to var. 9]
(11) [var. 9] Scherzo finale - (Vivace misurato) [fugue-like]
(12) [var. 10] (Hommage à Chopin) Tempo di Valse, tranquillo moderato.
(13) Tempo dello Scherzo. [conclusion based on var. 9]

[Note: The "Faustian" introduction (1) employs the technique of symmetrical harmony which Busoni had been developing over the previous twelve years. These four bars were so important to him that he later requested that they be played as introduction to the variations of 1888 (BV 213)] (Beaumont, p. 298.)

(b) Sechs Varianten zu Etüden und Präludien von Chopin, pp. 23-31.
[Six Variants of Etudes and Preludes by Chopin]

"Erst der Spiegel der Variante vom Urbild zeigt das Interessante." (Ferruccio Busoni)

The variants are taken from Chopin's Etudes Op. 10 (scores) and Preludes Op. 28 (scores) (Sitsky, p 282)

(1) [unmarked] [Variant of Etude, Op. 10 No.1 - broken chords in both hands]
(2) Moderato [Variant of Etude Op. 10 No.2 - chromatic figure played by thumb and second finger]
(3) Agitato [Variant of Op. 10, No.9 - broken figures in the right hand]
(4) Moderato vivace [Variant of Etude Op. 10, No.7 - begins more simply than Chopin, ends more difficulty, with both hands playing sixteenth-note chords]
(5) Allegro [Variant of Etude Op. 10, No.8 - Chopin's passage work is extended]
(6) Vivace [Upside-down variant of Prelude Op. 28, No.3] (score)

[Chopin's passage work is shifted to from the left to the right hand; the entire piece is transcribed and is performable.]

[The following piece also appears in the Second Edition, Book 9 as section (b)]
(c) Perpetuum mobile, pp. 32-42.

[Assigned the Kindermann catalog number BV 293 (score), this piece is a shortened version of the Scherzoso from the Concertino for Piano, BV 292. The middle section of the Scherzoso is replaced with a sequential passage.]
Beispiele: Czerny, Toccata [Op.92] (score)

Weber, Rondo aus der I. Sonate [Op.24] (score)
Saint-Saëns, Étude d'après le Finale du 5 Concerto [Op.111, No.6] (score)
Alkan, "Comme le vent" [Op.39, No.1] (score)
Alkan, "Le chemin de fer" [Op.27] (score)
Alkan, Étude pour les deux mains à mouvement semblable et perpétuel [Op.76, No.3] (score)

[The following four sections (d) to (g) also appear in the Second Edition, Book 1 "Scales" as sections (b) to (e).]
(d) Scales. 1. Allegro moderato, pp. 43-46.

[11 connected exercises in a series of keys with variants of techniques introduced in Part 1]

(e) (Scales.) 2. Übereinanderstellung verschiedener Tonarten. [Superimposed keys], pp. 47-48.

[Footnote:] "Sind von jeder Halbton stufe aus zu wiederholen." [To be repeated in half-tone steps.]
[Bitonal scale exercises with different, but related keys in the right and left hand, e.g., C major and A major, etc.; hands in similar and contrary motion]
[This set concludes with a "Faustian" cadence.] Beaumont, p. 304)

(f) (Scales.) 3. Presto volante, pp. 49-51.

[7 single-note scale exercises on a single stave, in different keys and patterns, played by alternating hands; the 8th exercise is on two staves with scales in simultaneous octaves played with alternating hands, finishing with diverging stepwise chords in both hands]

(g) Anhang. Terzen [Appendix. Thirds], p. 52

[5 scale exercises: broken thirds; double thirds split between two hands; double thirds in both hands; split chromatic thirds; split chromatic thirds with sliding fingers]
[This section should studied together with a similar section in Busoni's edition of the Well-Tempered Clavier, Book 1 (score)] (Sitsky, p. 166)

=== Klavierübung in Ten Books (Second Edition) ===
Title page:

Klavierübung in zehn Büchern von Ferruccio Busoni. Zweite umgestaltete und bereicherte Ausgabe.
[Piano Tutorial in Ten Books by Ferruccio Busoni. Second reorganized and enriched edition.]

Title shown on page 1:

Klavierübung. Studien and Vortragsstücke.
[Piano Tutorial. Studies and Performance Pieces.]

==== Book 1: Scales ====
Erstes Buch. Tonleitern, pp. 1–12. (score)

[The following section (a) also appears in the First Edition, Part 1, Tutorial I.]
(a) Presto, pp. 1-2.

[4 exercises using the thumb; 3 exercises not using the thumb; employ unusual and unorthodox fingerings: the thumb passing under the fifth finger; the fifth finger passing over the thumb; or not using the thumb at all]

[The following sections (b) to (e) also appear in the First Edition, Part 5, sections (d) to (g)]
(b) Allegro moderato, pp. 3-6.

[11 connected exercises in a series of keys with variants of the same techniques]

(c) [Superimposed keys], pp. 7-8.

[Bitonal scale exercises with different, but related keys in the right and left hand, e.g., C major and A major, etc.; hands in similar and contrary motion]
[This set concludes with a "Faustian" cadence.] Beaumont, p. 304)

(d) Presto volante, pp. 9-11.

[7 single-note scale exercises on a single stave, in different keys and patterns, played by alternating hands; the 8th exercise is on two staves with scales in simultaneous octaves played with alternating hands, finishing with diverging stepwise chords in both hands]

(e) [Thirds], p. 12.

[5 scale exercises: broken thirds; double thirds split between two hands; double thirds in both hands; split chromatic thirds; split chromatic thirds with sliding fingers]
[This section should studied together with a similar section in Busoni's edition of the Well-Tempered Clavier, Book 1 (score)] (Sitsky, p. 166)

==== Book 2: Forms derived from scales ====
Zweites Buch. Von Tonleitern abgeleitete Formen, pp. 13–26. (score)

[The following section (a) also appears in the First Edition, Part 1 as Tutorial II.]
(a) [Chords based on scale patterns]

(1) [Extended exercise], pp. 13-14.

Beispiele: Weber, Sonate C dur, [Op. 24] I. [Allegro] (score)

Liszt, Carillon, aus "der Weihnachtsbaum" [S.186/6 (score)

(2) Preludio: Allegro festivo, p. 15.

[begins in D♭ major and ends in C major]
Beispiel: Chopin, Fantasie [Op. 49] (score)

[The following section (b) also appears in the First Edition, Part 1 as Tutorial III.]
(b) [Chromatic "sliding-finger" technique]
["sixth finger" technique of sliding from black to white key in chromatic passages]

(1) [Seven exercises on double chromatics], pp. 16-17.
(2) Preludio (Andantino), pp. 17-18.
(3) Con bravura (la mano destra sotto), p. 18.

[alternating crossing hands: sliding one, two, three, four fingers simultaneously; both hands, similar motion, outer fingers held, inner sliding]
Beispiel: Liszt, Mazeppa (S.139/4) (score)

(4) Preludio (Tempo di Valse moderato), p. 19.
(5) Allegro moderato [exercise, in 6/8], pp. 19-20.

[The following section (c) also appears in the First Edition, Part 1 as Tutorial IV.]
(c) [Repeated notes]

(1) [Schema and eight variations], pp. 21-23.

[repeated note techniques, in various patterns of quarter, triplet, and sixteenth notes]

(2) Nach Schubert-Liszt, p. 23.

[excerpt from Auf dem Wasser zu singen, D 774, tr. Liszt, 12 Lieder von Franz Schubert, S.558/2 (score)] (Sitsky, p 243)
Beispiele: Chopin, Prelude Gis moll [in G♯ minor, Op.28, No.12]. (score)

Liszt, Schuberts "Auf dem Wasser zu singen" [S.558/2]. (score)
Liszt, Au bord d'une source. (S.160/4) (score)
Liszt, Tannhäuser-Ouverture. (S.442 (score)

(3) Allegretto, p. 24.

[based on bars 11 and 12 of the Indian Diary BV 267, No.1] (Sitsky, p 243)
Beispiel: Busoni, Indianisches Tagebuch, Nr. 2. (score)

(4) (Nach Auber-Liszt) Alla Tarantella., pp. 25-26.

[excerpt from Tarantelle di bravura dàprès la Tarantelle de La muette de Portici, S.386] (Sitsky, p 243)
Beispiel: Liszt, Tarantella di Bravura sur "la Muette de Portici". (score)

==== Book 3: Chordal (broken chords) ====
Drittes Buch. Akkordisches, pp. 27–50. (score)

[The following sections (a) to (c) also appear in the First Edition, Part 1, Tutorial V. (Arpeggios)]
(a) [5 arpeggio exercises, thumb and fifth finger passing over and under each other], pp. 27-28.

(b) Prestissimo; stretto, pp. 28-30.

[4 extension arpeggio exercises]
Beispiele: Chopin, Etude Op. 10 Nr. 1. (für die r. H.) (score)

Henselt, "Orage, tu ne saurais m'abattre". (für die l. H.) [12 Études caractéristiques, Op. 2, No.1] (score)
Chopin, Prélude Es dur. [Op. 28, No.19] (score)
Liszt, Vision. [S.139, No.6] ([ score])
Bach-Busoni, Wohltemperiertes Klavier I, Varianten zu den Präludien in D moll und B dur

(c) (Nach Bach), p. 30.

[exercise based on Prelude No.1, BWV 846, from the Well-Tempered Clavier, Book I] (Sitsky, p 203)

[The following section (d) also appears in the First Edition, Part 3, section (m) (pp. 45-46), as "Appendix to Tutorial V."]
(d) [6 further arpeggio exercises], pp. 31-32.

["chains of all types of 7th chords and their derivatives"] (Sitsky, p. 167)

[The following sections (e) to (i) also appear in the First Edition, Part 1, Tutorial V. (Arpeggios)]
(e) Nach Beethoven. Allegretto, pp. 33-34.

[exercise based an excerpt of the Waldstein sonata (beginning at bar 61 of the Rondo Allegretto; score).] (Sitsky, p 278)

(f) [Contrary motion extension study], p. 35.

[this exercise includes some big stretches](Sitsky, p 167

(g) Allegro vivace, p. 36.

[contrary-similar motion combined]

(h)[Extended broken octaves], pp. 37-38.

Beispiele: (for die linke Hand) Rubinstein Etüde Es dur, 6 Etudes, Op. 23, No.4 in E♭ major (score)

Busoni, Indianisches Tagebuch, No.4. (score)

(i) Preludio, pp. 39-40.

"Rather charming...in 3/2, with stretches in both hands."] (Sitsky, p 267)

[The following sections (j) to (l) also appear in the First Edition, Part 2, Tutorial VIII. (Examples with Arpeggios)]
(j) Nach Beethoven. Allegro, pp. 41-42.

[exercise based on a 2-bar excerpt from the 4th movement of Sonata, Op. 26 (with six example variants)] (Sitsky, p 278; Beaumont, p. 303)
Beispiel: Sonate Op. 26. [Sonata No.12 "Funeral March"] (score)
Beispiel: Alkan, Etudes dans les tons majeurs: C dur Stück. [Op. 35, No.4] (score)

(k) Preludio. Andante tranquillo, pp. 43-44.

[excerpt based on Busoni's Improvisation on "Wie wohl ist mir" for two pianos (BV 271; score), beginning at bar 10] (Beaumont, p. 303)

(l) Tempo di Valse, elegantemente, pp. 45-48.

[After 2 bars of introduction the piece is essentially identical to the 28-bar Intermezzo in A♭ major from Busoni's Fourth Ballet Scene (first version of 1892, BV 238; score); it then modulates into a new 24-bar middle section, and finally returns to A♭ major in the 19-bar conclusion.] (Beaumont, p. 303)
Beispiele: Chopin, Prélude Fis moll. [Prelude in F♯ minor, Op.28, No.8] (score)

Liszt, Waldesrauschen (S.145, No.1) (score)
Liszt, Dante-Sonate, Mittelsatz. [S.167, No.7] (score)

[The following section (m) does not appear in the First Edition.]
(m) [Unmarked arpeggio study], pp. 49-50.

[shortened version of the etude from Prélude & Etude (en arpèges), BV 297 (score)]

==== Book 4: "For Three Hands" ====
Viertes Buch. "À trois mains," pp. 51–62. (score)

[Piano music "à trois mains" ("for three hands") combines three musical lines (written on three staves), which sounds as though it is played by three hands, but nevertheless is actually played by two.]

[The following sections (a) to (c) also appear in the First Edition, Part 1, Tutorial VI. Examples of "three hands"]
(a) Preludio. Alla Tarantella, pp. 51-52.

(b) Nach Offenbach. Barcarole, pp. 53-54.

[transcription of the Barcarole from the Tales of Hoffmann] (score) (Sitsky, p 289; Beaumont, p. 303)

(c) Nach Beethoven. Presto, pp. 55-56.

[excerpt from the fifth movement of the C♯ minor Quartet Op. 131 (score), transcribed for piano; consists of the first 24 bars, jumps to the fermata before the "a tempo" at bar 44 and proceeds to the cadence at the beginning of the first ending at bar 65] (Sitsky, p 278)
Beispiele: Schubert-Liszt, Das Sterbeglöcklein.

[Schubert song, D.871, transcribed for solo piano]
[No.3 from Liszt's Sechs Melodien (6 Melodies), S.563]

Liszt, Valse a capriccio sur Lucia e Parisina (Erste Fassung) [S.401]
Busoni, Concerto (score)

[The following sections (d) to (f) also appear in the First Edition, Part 2, Tutorial IX. A second group for tutorial VI]
(d) Perpetuum mobile et infinitum. Studie nach Bach (aus "an die Jugend"). Allegro non troppo, pp. 57-58.

[An endlessly repeating 24-bar loop extracted from the "Fuga figurata" of Book 2 of Busoni's An die Jugend, BV 254 (score). The piece combines themes from the prelude and the fugue of Bach's Prelude and Fugue No.5 in D major (BWV 850) from the Well-Tempered Clavier, Book 1 (score)]

(e) Nach Schubert, pp. 59-60.

[16-bar excerpt beginning just before bar 57 of Liszt's transcription of Schubert's song Erlkönig in 12 Lieder von Franz Schubert, S.558/4 (score)] (Sitsky, p 293)

(f) Aus meinem "Concerto". Trattenuto e fantasticamente, pp. 61-62.

[excerpt, from the 2nd movement of Busoni's Concerto Op. XXXIX, BV 247, p. 45 of the Egon Petri two-piano reduction

==== Book 5: Trills ====
Fünftes Buch. Triller, pp. 63–88. (score)

[The following sections (a) to (g) also appear in the First Edition, Part 2, Tutorial VII. Trills]
(a) Moderato, pp. 63-65.

[3 extended exercises in trills (forming one "preludio")]

(b) Nach Bach. Andante, pp. 66-68.

[Variation 28 from Goldberg Variations, BV B 35 (score)] (Sitsky, p 203)
Beispiele: Beethovens Sonaten Op. 53 (score), Op. 109 (score) und Op. 111 (score).

(c) Nach Beethoven. Allegro, pp. 69-70.

[based on part of the fugue from the 'Hammerklavier' Sonata, Op. 106]
[The trills are written out and fitted with the other parts.] (Sitsky, pp. 278-279)
Beispiel: Vergleiche die ganze Fuge aus Beethovens Sonate Op. 106. (score)

(d) Preludio (ohne den 3. Finger [without the third finger]). Moderato alla breve, pp. 71-72.

Beispiele: ^{1)} ohne den 4. Finger: Chopin, Etudes Op. 25 F dur [No.3] (score),

ohne den 3. und 4. Finger: Chopin, Etudes Op. 10 As dur [No.10] (score).
^{2)} für die wechselnden Sekunden intervalle: Liszt's "Feux Follets" [Transcendental Etude No.5, S.139/5 (score)]

(e) Nach Gounod. Andante con moto, pp. 73-75.

[Busoni cadenza to Liszt-Gounod Valse de l'Opera Faust, S.407]
[begins at bar 24 of the Andantino (p. 9) of the Liszt score
[The Andantino section is based on the vision of Gretchen from Act 1.] (Beaumont, p. 303)
[Egon Petri's recording of this piece uses the Busoni cadenza.] (Sitsky, p. 240)
[4 measures for returning from Busoni's cadenza to the "Allegro vivace assai" of the Faust Waltz are provided by Sitsky on p 242.]
Beispiele: Faust-Walzer (score)

Die Vogelpredigt [S.175/1] (score)
Gondoliera [S.162/1] aus: Venezia e Napoli (Liszt) (score)

(f) Preludio. Allegro, pp. 76-78.

["an effective preludio...with straightforward trill decoration running through it"] (Sitsky, p 168)

(g) Nach Liszt. Andantino, pp. 79-82.

[theme from Gondoliera (from Liszt's Venezia e Napoli], score) with 3 variations] (Sitsky, p 243)

[The following section (h) also appears in the First Edition, Part 3, section (n), p. 47.]
(h) 7 Variationen nach eimem Motive von Beethoven, p. 83.
[Appendix: Seven variations on a motive of Beethoven.]

[Footnote:] In verschiedenen Tonarten zu üben. Auch in Moll. [To be practiced in different keys. Also in minor.]
[The motive is from the coda of the first movement of the 'Emperor' concerto (score)]

[The following piece is not included in the First Edition]
(i) Veloce e leggiero, pp. 84-88.

[This extended piece, composed 1–3 January 1924, is Busoni's last piano composition (score). The music was also intended for Busoni's unfinished opera Doktor Faust, and Antony Beaumont used it for his completion of the opera.] (Beaumont, p. 305)
["A sinister five-page essay in Busoni's best spectral style..."] (Sitsky, p 168)

==== Book 6: Staccato ====
Sechstes Buch. Lo Staccato, pp. 89–117. (score)

[The material in Book 6 also appears in the First Edition, Part 3 "Staccato", sections (a) to (j).]

(a) Vorwort zum Sechsten Buch, p. 89.

[Foreword by Ferruccio Busoni, dated Zurich, July 1920.]

(b) Vivace Moderato, con precisione, pp. 90-93.

["...hectic and difficult study in staccato chords...."] (Sitsky, p 169)

(c) Variations-Studie nach Mozart, 1, pp. 94-95.

[transcription (score) of the "Serenade" from Don Giovanni]
[This piece was played frequently by Egon Petri as an encore.] (Sitsky, p 264)

(d) Variations-Studie nach Mozart, 2. Allegro, pp. 96-101.

[slightly altered versions the Giga and Variazione from Book 3 of An die Jugend, BV 254 (score); the Bolero is cut] (Sitsky, pp. 264-266)

(e) Motive. Allegro risoluto, pp. 102-104.

[staccato study with alternating-hands]
["a sequential study employing various intervals, including bars of consecutive seconds"] (Sitsky, p. 169)

(f) Preludio. Quasi presto, arditamente, pp. 105-107.

[Preludio from Busoni's Toccata, BV 287 (score)]

(g) Nach Mendelssohn. Vivace assai, pp. 108-109.

[transcription of the Presto from the Mendelssohn-Liszt Wedding March & Elfin Chorus, S.410 (score)] (Sitsky, p 243)

(h) Nach Bizet. Allegro deciso, pp. 110-111.

[consists of the first 68-bars of Busoni's Kammer Fantasie über Carmen, BV 284 (score) with 6-bars added to provide an ending] (Sitsky, p 279)

(i) Nach Liszt. Quasi Galopp, sempre da Capo, pp. 112-113.

[60-bar indefinitely repeating excerpt from Busoni's piano transcription of Liszt's Mephisto Waltz for orchestra (S.110), BV B 61 (beginning on p. 27 of the complete score)] (Sitsky, p 243)

(j) Allegro, pp. 114-117.

"...another fierce-looking study in staccato chords...." (Sitsky, p 170)
Beispiele: Weber, Momento capriccioso (score)

Schumann, Toccata (score)
Rubinstein, Etüde C dur [Op.23, No.2] (score)
Mozart-Liszt, Don Juan-Fantasie, Finale (Ausgabe Busoni) (score)
Liszt, La Campanella (Ausgabe Busoni) (score)
Liszt, Galop chromatique
Liszt, Tarantella di Bravura (score)
Alkan, Etüde majeur No.12 (score)
Cramer-Busoni, Etüden, II. Heft (score)
Busoni, Fugen-Etüde, Op. 16 [No.5] (score)
Busoni, Turandots Frauengemach (BV 249, No.4] (score)
Busoni, Indianisches Tagebuch, Nr. 2. [BV 267, No.2] (score)
Busoni, IV. Ballet-Szene (Galopp). [BV 238a, No.2] (score)

==== Book 7: Eight Etudes after Cramer ====
Siebentes Buch. Acht Etüden nach Cramer (score)

[Busoni's edition of the Cramer etudes was originally published in 1897 by Schlesinger (BV B 53). That edition is faithful to the originals, except the slow introduction of No.5 [recte No. 6] is omitted, and possible changes to Etudes 4 to 8 are indicated with ossias. The etudes republished in the Klavierübung (First Edition, Part 4) are identical to those in the Schlesinger edition. However, in this edition Etudes 4 to 8 include the ossias in the text without notification and contain musical and pianistic changes as well.] (Sitsky, p 284)

Acht Etüden nach Cramer, pp. 118-150.

1. Allegro non tanto
2. Comodo: Behaglich
3. En Carillon: Moderato
4. Allegro di Bravura
5. Répétition: Allegrissimo
6. Allegro moderato
7. Scherzando: Piùttosto moderato
8. Finale: Molto agitato quasi presto

==== Book 8: Variations and Variants on Chopin ====
Achtes Buch. Variationen und Varianten zu Chopin (score)

[The material in Book 8 also appears in the First Edition, Part 5 "Variations. Perpetual motion. Scales.", sections (a) and (b).]

(a) Neun Variationen über ein Präludium von Chopin, pp. 151-167.

[The same as Zehn Variationen über ein Präludium von Chopin (BV 213a, except the "Fantasia" section is omitted (score)] (Sitsky, p 57)
[The variations are played without pause; they are not numbered in the score, but are numbered here according to Sitsky.]

(1) Sostenuto [Introduction]
(2) Largo [Chopin Prelude]
(3) [var. 1] Sostenuto (alla breve)
(4) [var. 2] poco più vivo, legg. scherzoso
(5) [var. 3] (En Carillon)
(6) [var. 4] continuando. dolce
(7) [var. 5] sotto voce e poi sempre aumentando
(8) [var. 6] [no marking, begins on p. 159, 4th beat of first measure]
[The Fantasia section is omitted here; it is included in the 1st edition of the Klavierübung.]
(9) [var. 7] deciso. [6 measures serving as introduction to var. 8]
(10) [var. 8] Scherzo finale - (Vivace misurato) [fugue-like]
(11) [var. 9] (Hommage à Chopin) Tempo di Valse, tranquillo moderato.
(12) Tempo dello Scherzo. [conclusion based on var. 8]

[Note: The "Faustian" introduction (1) employs the technique of symmetrical harmony which Busoni had been developing over the previous twelve years. These four bars were so important to him that he later requested that they be played as introduction to the variations of 1888 (BV 213)] (Beaumont, p. 298.)

(b) Varianten zu Etüden und Präludien von Chopin, pp. 168-177.
[Six Variants of Etudes and Preludes by Chopin]

"Erst der Spiegel der Variante vom Urbild zeigt das Interessante." (Ferruccio Busoni)
[The variants are taken from Chopin's Etudes Op. 10 (scores) and Preludes Op. 28 (scores)] (Sitsky, p 282)

(1) [unmarked] [Variant of Etude, Op. 10 No.1 - broken chords in both hands]
(2) Moderato [Variant of Etude Op. 10 No.2 - chromatic figure played by thumb and second finger]

[followed with a page of suggested variants (not found in the First Edition)]

(3) Agitato [Variant of Op. 10, No.9 - broken figures in the right hand]
(4) Moderato vivace [Variant of Etude Op. 10, No.7 - begins more simply than Chopin, ends more difficulty, with both hands playing sixteenth-note chords]
(5) Allegro [Variant of Etude Op. 10, No.8 - Chopin's passage work is extended]
(6) Vivace [Upside-down variant of Prelude Op. 28, No.3] (score)

[Chopin's passage work is shifted to from the left to the right hand; the entire piece is transcribed and is performable.]

==== Book 9: Seven Short Pieces for the Cultivation of Polyphonic Playing ====
Neuntes Buch. Sieben kurze Stücke zur Pflege des polyphonen Spiels (score)

(a) Sieben kurze Stücke zur Pflege des polyphonen Spiels, pp. 178-202.

[Nos.1 and 7 were added to extend Fünf kurze Stücke zur Pflege des polyphonen Spiels auf dem Pianoforte, BV 296. The pieces follow a cycle of keys of ascending fourths.] (Sitsky, p. 170)
1. Preludietto. Allegro [in E major]

[This piece also appears in the First Edition, Part I, Tutorial I, section (f)]

2. Sostenuto [in e minor]
3. Andante molto tranquillo e legato [in A minor]
4. Allegro [begins in D minor; ends in D major]
5. Preludio. Andante tranquillo [in G major]
6. nach Mozart. Adagio [in c minor]

[Footnote:] *) "Zwei geharnischte Männer" (die Zauberflöte)

7. Mit Anwendung des III. Pedals (Steinway & Sons Sostenuto-Pedal.) Andante tranquillo. [in F major]

[This piece is written on 4 staves, two for the Hauptstimme [principal part] and two for the Liegende Töne [Held notes]. Busoni finished it on 13 November 1923 in Paris. It is dedicated to Leonhard Tauber, who was his host while he was in Paris. The music was intended for the moment of Faust's death at the end of the final scene of his unfinished opera Doktor Faust.] (Beaumont, p. 306.)

[The following piece also appears in the First Edition, Part 5 as section (c)]

(b) Perpetuum mobile (nach des Concertino II. Satze), pp. 203-213.

[Assigned the Kindermann catalog number BV 293 (score), this piece is a shortened version of the Scherzoso from the Concertino for Piano, BV 292. The middle section of the Scherzoso is replaced with a sequential passage.]
Beispiele: Czerny, Toccata [Op.92] (score)

Weber, Rondo aus der I. Sonate [Op.24] (score)
Saint-Saëns, Étude d'après le Finale du 5 Concerto [Op.111, No.6] (score)
Alkan, "Comme le vent" [Op.39, No.1] (score)
Alkan, "Le chemin de fer" [Op.27] (score)
Alkan, Étude pour les deux mains à mouvement semblable et perpétuel [Op.76, No.3] (score)

==== Book 10: Etudes after Paganini-Liszt ====
Zehntes Buch. Etüden nach Paganini-Liszt (score)

[Sections (a) to (f) are Busoni's concert transcriptions (scores) of Liszt's Grandes Études de Paganini (S.141)]

(a) 1. [Etude No.1 "Tremolo" (in G minor) (BV B 75)], pp. 214-227.

(b) 2. [Etude No.2 (in E♭ major) (BV B 70)], pp. 228-238.

(c) 3. [Etude No.3 "La Campanella" (in G♯ minor) (BV B 68)], pp. 239-256.

(d) 4. [Etude No.4 "Arpeggio" (in E major) (BV B 74)], pp. 257-261.

[This etude also appears in the First Edition, Part 3, section (k), with the title Variations-Studie nach Paganini-Liszt, 1.]

(e) 5. [Etude No.5 "La Chasse" (in E major) (BV B 76)], pp. 262-267.

(f) 6. [Etude No.6 "Theme with variations" (in A minor) (BV B 67)], pp. 268-275.

[This etude also appears in the First Edition, Part 3, section (l), with the title Variations-Studie nach Paganini-Liszt, 2.]

(g) Introduzione e Capriccio (Paganinesco), pp. 276-284.

[Book 4 of An die Jugend, without "Epilogo", BV 254 (score)]

== Composition and publication details ==
- Klavierübung in Five Parts (First Edition)

Part 1: Sechs Klavierübungen und Präludien

•Compiled and composed: Zurich, 10–12 September, 10 October 1917
•Manuscript: Busoni Archive No.303
•Publication:

1) Leipzig: Breitkopf & Härtel, 1918, cat. no. EB 5066, plate no. 28210, (39 pages)
2) Wiesbaden: Breitkopf & Härtel, 1954 (reprint)
3) Wiesbaden: Breitkopf & Härtel, [ca. 1990] (reprint)

•Dedication: An die Musikschule und das Konservatorium in Basel

Part 2: Drei Klavierübungen und Präludien

•Compiled and composed: 7 November 1917 - 7 June 1918
•Manuscript: Busoni Archive No. 306
•Publication:

1) Leipzig: Breitkopf & Härtel, 1919, cat. no. EB 5067, plate no. 28321, (47 pages)
2) Wiesbaden: Breitkopf & Härtel, [ca. 1996] (reprint)

•Dedication: An die Musikschule und das Konservatorium zu Basel

Part 3: Lo Staccato

•Compiled and composed: June 1919 - 10 Mar 1921
•Manuscript: Busoni Archive No. 324
•Proof copy: Busoni Archive No. 358
•Publication:

1) Leipzig: Breitkopf & Härtel, 1921, EB 5068, plate no. 28665, (47 pages)
2) Leipzig: VEB Breitkopf & Härtel, [1950] (reprint)
3) Wiesbaden: Breitkopf & Härtel, [1950] (reprint)
4) Wiesbaden: Breitkopf & Härtel, [ca. 1996] (reprint)

•Ded: An die Musikschule und das Konservatorium in Basel. F. Busoni.

Part 4: Acht Etüden von Cramer

•Transcribed: ca. 1896 (BV B 53)
•Manuscript: Unknown.
•Publication:

1) Berlin: Schlesinger, London: The Frederick Harris Company, 1897, S.8772 (separately from Klavierübung)
2) Leipzig: Breitkopf & Härtel, 1922, EB 5224, plate number 28809, (35 pages)
3) Wiesbaden, Leipzig, Paris: Breitkopf & Härtel, [1955] (reprint)
4) Wiesbaden: Breitkopf & Härtel, [ca. 1996] (reprint)

•Dedication: Herrn Professor Carl Lütschg in St. Petersburg.

Part 5: Variationen, Perpetuum mobile, Tonleitern.

•Composed: April–May 1922
•Manuscript: Busoni Archive No. 337 (Terzen Tonleitern [Scales in Thirds])
•Publication:

1) Leipzig: Breitkopf & Härtel, 1922, EB 5225, 5230, and 5231, plate no. 28765, (52 pages)
2) Wiesbaden, Leipzig, Paris: Breitkopf & Härtel, [1955?] (reprint)
3) Wiesbaden: Breitkopf & Härtel, [ca. 1996] (reprint)

•Dedication: À Gino Tagliapietra (Variationen); À Cella Delavrancea (Perpetuum mobile).

•Ref: Dent, pp. 344, 349; Kindermann, pp. 461-463; Sitsky, pp. 162, 375-77; Beaumont, pp. 295-6, 370-2; Roberge, p. 45.

- Klavierübung in Ten Books (Second Edition)

•Compiled and composed: Dec 1923 - Jan 1924

•Note: Listed in an itemization of his compositions, prepared by Busoni, now part of the Busoni Archive.

•Manuscripts:

•In the Busoni Archive at the Staatsbibliothek zu Berlin:

•No. 303 Sechs Klavierübungen und Präludien (also First Edition, Part 1)
•No. 306 Drei Klavierübungen und Präludien (also First Edition, Part 2)
•No. 324 "Lo Staccato" (also First Edition, Part 3)
•No. 337 Terzen Tonleitern (also First Edition, Part 5)
•No. N. Mus. ms. 215 Exercise pour l'emploi de la troisième Pedale

•In the Galston-Busoni Archive, James D. Hoskins Library, University of Tennessee, Knoxville:

•F.4.d Preludio (no. 2 of BV 296 Fünf kurze Stücke zur Pflege des polyphonen Spiels)
•F.4.a, F.4.c, and F.8 (ms and proof copy of BV 297 Prélude et Étude en Arpèges)
•F.3 Liszt-Busoni "Tremolo" 1 Etude nach Paganini (BV B 75)
•F.4 Liszt-Busoni "La Chasse" 5 Etüde nach Paganini (BV B 76)
•F.9 Sechs Varianten zu Etüden und Präludien von Chopin

•Publications:

1) Breitkopf & Härtel, Copyright 1925, cat. no. FB VIII (as Vol. VIII of the Bach-Busoni Edition), (284 pages)

•Title: Klavierübung in zehn Büchern, zweite umgestaltete und bereicherte Ausgabe.

[Piano tutorial in ten books, second reorganized and enriched edition.]

2) Books 1-5 republished by State Publishing House, Moscow, 1968, ed. J. Milstein. Plate no. 4135
3) Breitkopf & Härtel, Wiesbaden, 1968 (selected items ed. by Franzpeter Goebels)

•Ref: Dent, p. 344; Kindermann, pp. 463-464; Sitsky, pp. 162-163, 380-381; Beaumont, pp. 295-296, 372; Roberge, pp. 46, 55, 57.
