= Faust Symphony =

Choral symphony by Franz Liszt

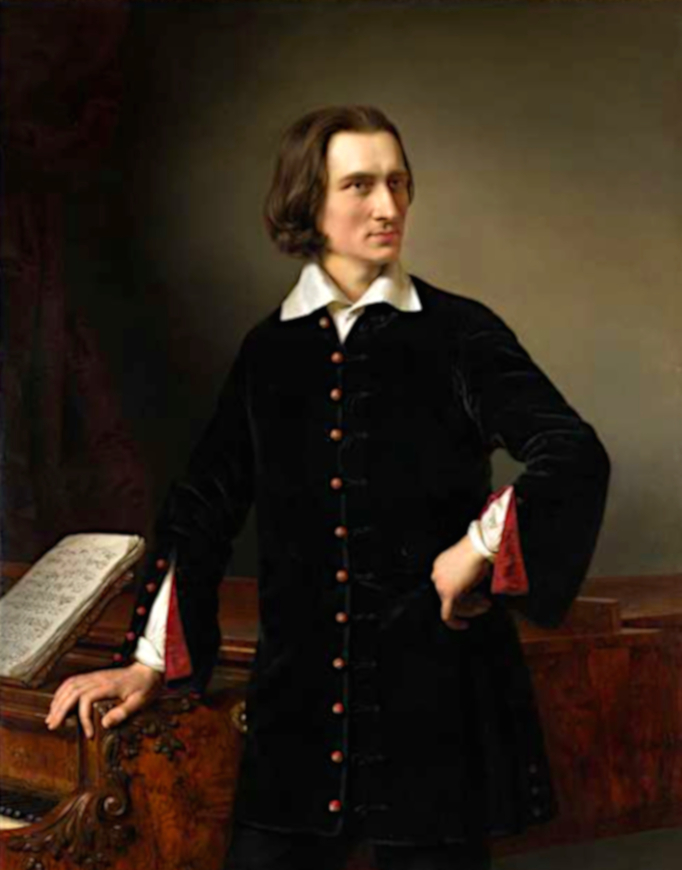
Franz Liszt, portrait by Hungarian painter Miklós Barabás, 1847

A Faust Symphony in three character pictures (German: Eine Faust-Symphonie in drei Charakterbildern), S.108, or simply the Faust Symphony, is a choral symphony written by Hungarian composer Franz Liszt inspired by Johann Wolfgang von Goethe's drama, Faust. The symphony was premiered in Weimar on 5 September 1857, for the inauguration of the Goethe–Schiller Monument there.

== Structure ==
The first clue as to the work's structure is in Liszt's title: "A Faust Symphony in Three Character Sketches after Goethe: (1) Faust, (2) Gretchen, (3) Mephistopheles." Liszt does not attempt to tell the story of Goethe's drama. Rather, he creates musical portraits of the three main protagonists. By doing so, though this symphony is a multi-movement work and employs a male chorus in its final moments, Liszt adopts the same aesthetic position as in his symphonic poems. The work is approximately 75 minutes in duration.

=== I. Faust ===
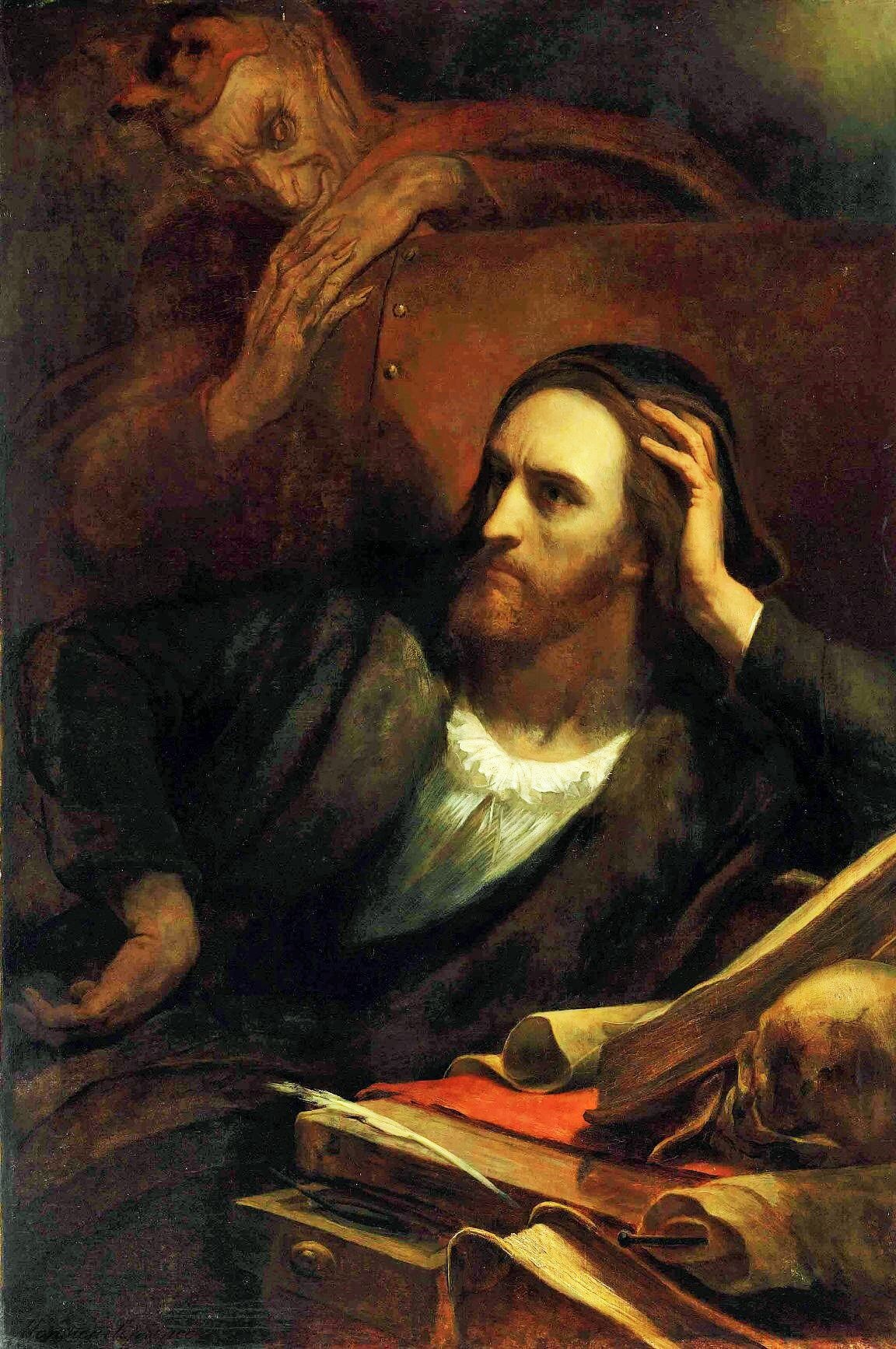
Faust and Mephistopheles (1848) by Ary Scheffer

This large-scale movement (usually lasting around 30 minutes) is a very loose sonata-form with a short central development and a protracted recapitulation. One might say that this movement represents the very synthesis of the whole symphony, since many of its themes and motives appear throughout the score in various guises, a process of thematic transformation which Liszt mastered to the highest level during his Weimar years.

The basic key of the symphony (C minor) is already rather blurred by the opening theme made up of augmented triads and containing all 12 notes of the chromatic scale consecutively (this is the first published use of a twelve-tone row, other than a simple chromatic scale, in any music). This theme evokes the gloomy Faust, a dreamer, in everlasting search for truth and knowledge. Next follows the so-called 'Nostalgia' theme introduced by the oboe. At the end of a slow crescendo, there appears a violent Allegro agitato ed appassionato theme, depicting Faust's insatiable appetite for the pleasures of life – this theme establishes a gingery C minor threatened with collapse under the weight of highly chromatic elements. A melody of the oboe and clarinet represents the hero's 'painful delights'. The last theme is pentatonic and resolute. From all these elements, Liszt weaves a musical structure of power and grandeur, in which some critics recognise the composer's self-portrait.

=== II. Gretchen ===
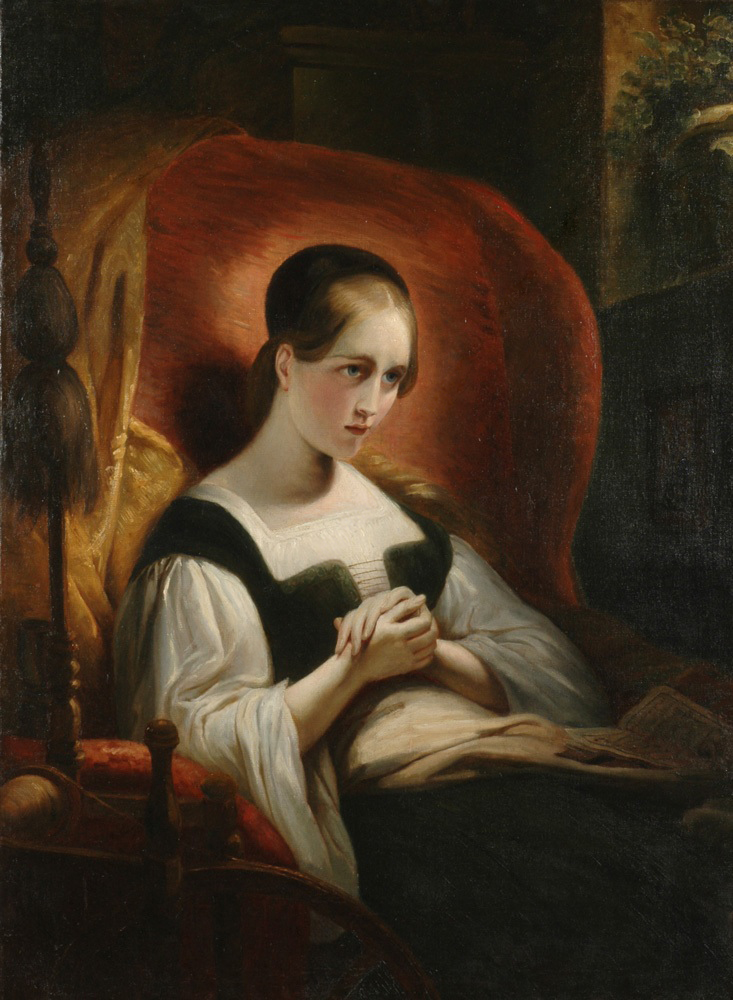
Margarete at the Spinning Wheel (c. 1840-50) by Ary Scheffer

This slow movement is in the key of A♭ major. Following the introduction on the flutes and clarinets, we are given the pure oboe's melody figurated by the viola's tender decorations, which expresses Gretchen's virginal innocence. A dialogue between clarinet and violins describes her naively plucking the petals of a flower, in a game of 'he loves me, he loves me not'. She is obsessed by Faust, and therefore we may hear Faust's themes being introduced progressively into the music, until his and Gretchen's themes form a passionate love duet. This draws the second movement to a peaceful and short recapitulation.

An alternative interpretation of the Gretchen movement is that, as Lawrence Kramer writes, "What we have been calling Gretchen's music is really Faust's." The entire Gretchen movement could be seen as representing her from the perspective of Faust. Consequently, the listener really learns more about Faust than about Gretchen. In Goethe's drama, she is a complex heroine. In Liszt's symphony, she is innocent and one-dimensional—a simplification that could arguably exist exclusively in Faust's imagination. The listener becomes aware of this masquerade when the "Gretchen" mask Faust is wearing slips with the appearance of the Faustian themes in bars 44 through 51 and bar 111 to the end of the movement.

=== III. Mephistopheles ===
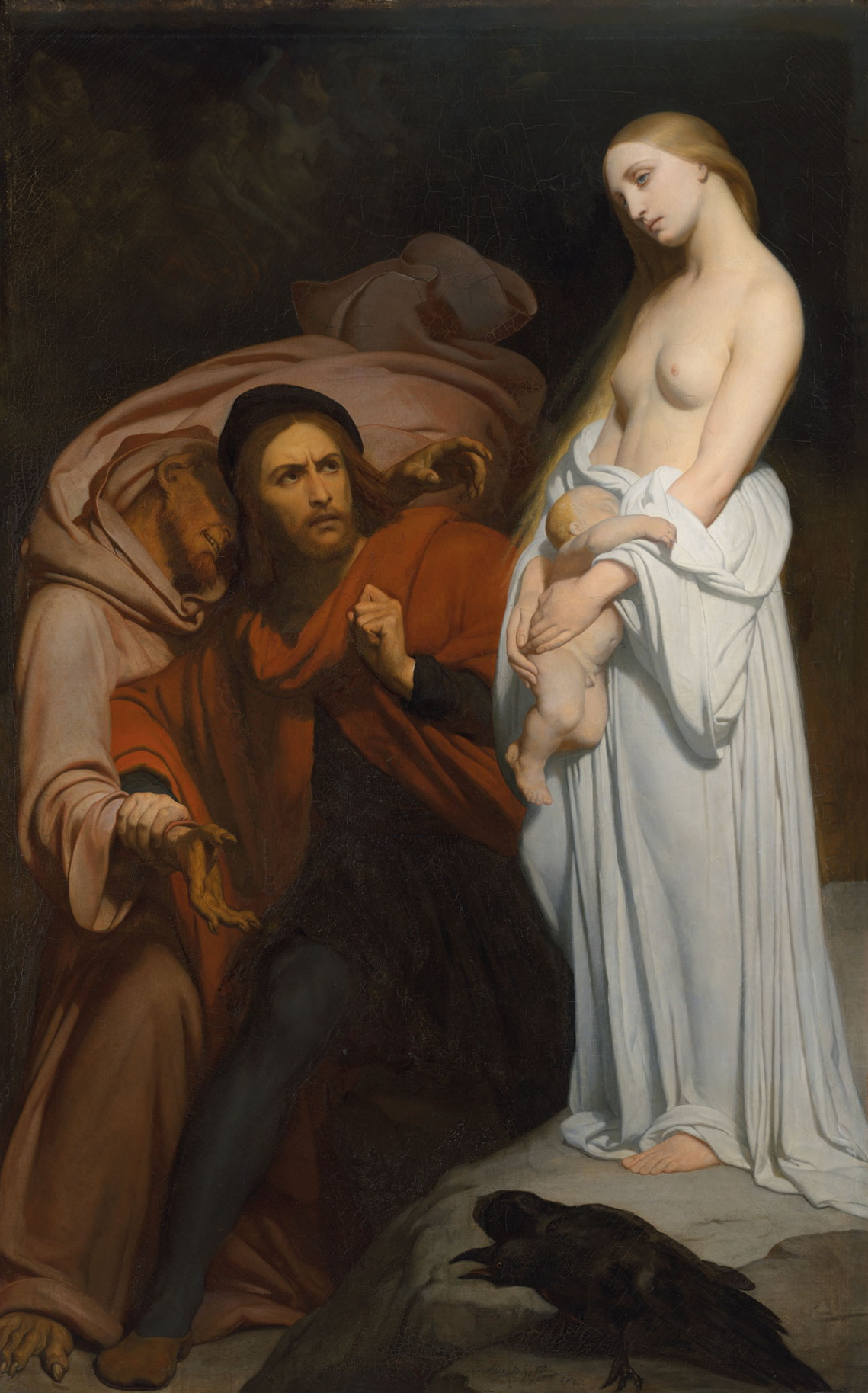
Faust in the Walpurgis Night (c. 1840-50) by Ary Scheffer

Some critics suggest that, like Gretchen, Mephistopheles can be seen as an abstraction—in this case, one of the destructive aspects of Faust's character, with Faust mocking his humanity by taking on Mephistopheles' character. Regardless of which interpretation a listener chooses, since Mephistopheles, Satan, the Spirit of Negation, is not capable of creating his own themes, he takes all of Faust's themes from the first movement and mutilates them into ironic and diabolical distortions. Here, Liszt's mastery of thematic metamorphosis shows itself in its full power – therefore we may understand this movement as a modified recapitulation of the first one. The music is pushed to the very verge of atonality by use of high chromaticism, rhythmic leaps and fantastic scherzo-like sections. A modified version of Faust's second and third themes then creates an infernal fugue. Mephistopheles is, however, powerless when faced with Gretchen's innocence, so her theme remains intact. It even pushes the Spirit of Negation away towards the end of the work.

=== Text of the revised ending ===
It is here that the two versions of the Faust Symphony merit different interpretations. Liszt's original version of 1854 ended with a last fleeting reference to Gretchen and an optimistic peroration in C major, based on the most majestic of themes from the opening movement. Some critics suggest this conclusion remains within the persona of Faust and his imagination. When Liszt rethought the piece three years later, he added a 'chorus mysticus', tranquil and positive. The male chorus sings the words from Goethe's Faust:

Original German	English Translation
Alles Vergängliche Ist nur ein Gleichnis; Das Unzulängliche, Hier wird's Ereignis; Das Unbeschreibliche, Hier ist es getan; Das Ewigweibliche Zieht uns hinan.	Everything transitory Is only an allegory; What cannot be achieved, Here it will come to pass; What cannot be described, Here it is accomplished; The eternal feminine Draws us aloft.

The tenor soloist then rises above the murmur of the chorus and starts to sing the last two lines of the text, emphasizing the power of salvation through the eternal feminine. The symphony ends in a glorious blaze of the choir and orchestra, backed up by sustained chords on the organ. With this direct association to the final scene of Goethe's drama we escape Faust's imaginings and hear another voice commenting on his striving and redemption. The text of the chorus is also the end of Gustav Mahler's eighth symphony.

== Instrumentation ==
The work is scored for an orchestral complement of piccolo, two flutes, two oboes, two clarinets, two bassoons, four French horns, three trumpets, three trombones, tuba, timpani, cymbals, triangle, organ, harp, and strings. A tenor soloist and TTB male choir (two tenor parts and single bass part) are also employed in the final movement.

== Overview ==
=== Composition ===
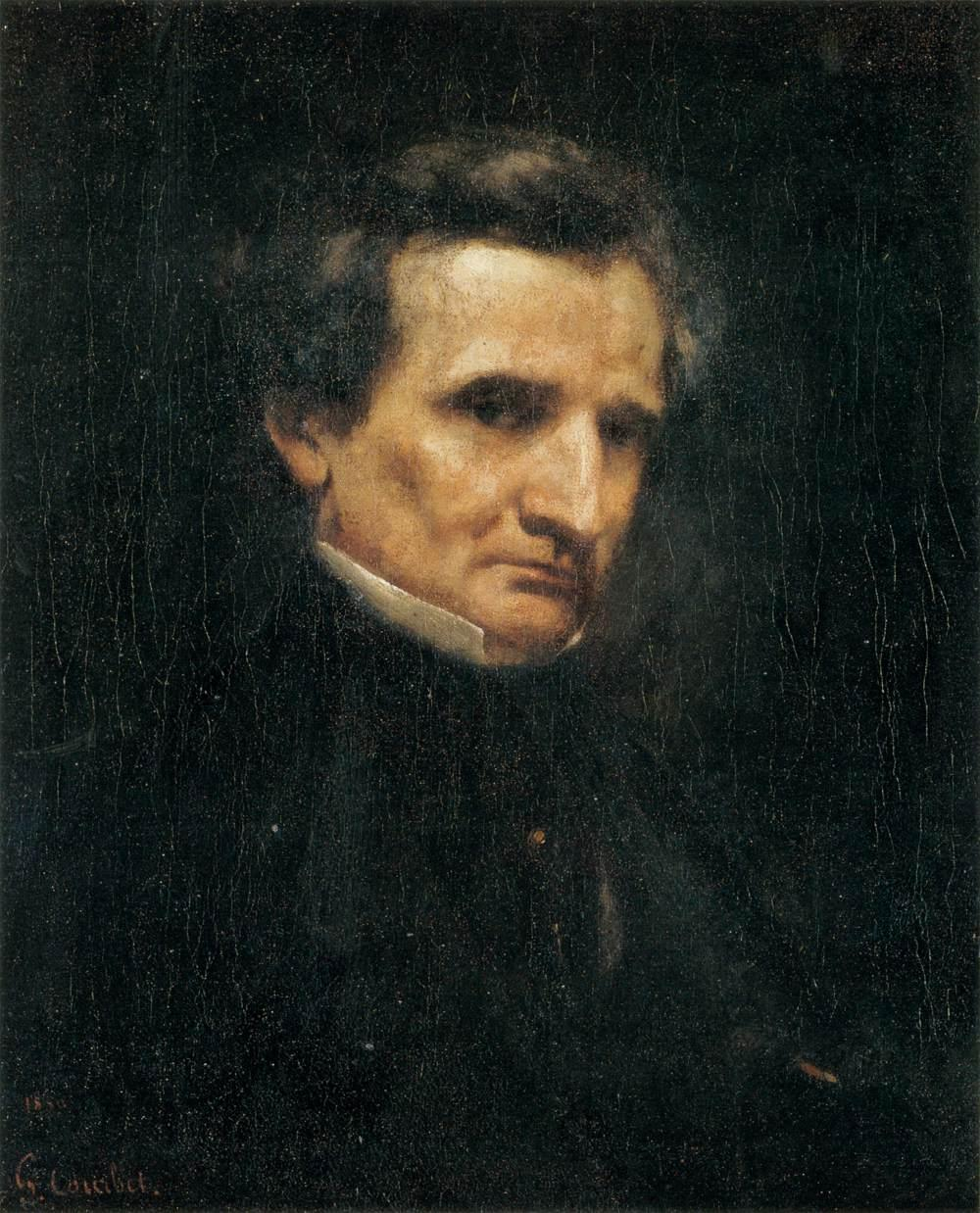
Portrait of Hector Berlioz (1850) by Gustave Courbet

Hector Berlioz, who wrote his own version of Faust and became the eventual dedicatee of Liszt's Faust Symphony, introduced Liszt to Goethe's Faust in the 1830s through the French translation of Gérard de Nerval. Although sketches exist from the 1840s, he was hesitant about composing this work. He commented wryly to one correspondent, "The worst Jesuit is dearer to me than the whole of your Goethe." In an 1869 letter, Liszt makes a revealing comparison between Faust and Manfred:

In my youth I passionately admired Manfred and valued him much more than Faust, who, between you and me, in spite of his marvellous prestige in poetry, seemed to me a decidedly bourgeois character. For that reason he becomes more varied, more complete, richer, more communicative ... (than Manfred) ... Faust's personality scatters and dissipates itself; he takes no action, lets himself be driven, hesitates, experiments, loses his way, considers, bargains, and is interested in his own little happiness. Manfred could certainly not have thought of putting up with the bad company of Mephistopheles, and if he had loved Marguerite he would have been able to kill her, but never abandon her in a cowardly manner like Faust.

Despite Liszt's apparent antipathy toward the character of Faust, his residency in Weimar surrounded him with Goethe and the Faust legend at practically every turn. He had barely served out his first year as Kapellmeister when Grand Duke Carl Alexander decreed that the city would celebrate the centennial of Goethe's birth on 28 August 1849. During this celebration Liszt conducted, among other things, excerpts from Robert Schumann's Scenes from Goethe's Faust for orchestra and choir. After the centennial remembrance, he helped in the creation of a Goethe Foundation; this culminated in the publication of Liszt's brochure De la Fondation-Goethe à Weimar. In the summer of 1850 Gérard de Nerval himself stayed as Liszt's guest. There was much talk about Faust and the topic would spill over into their subsequent correspondence.

The performance of Berlioz's La Damnation de Faust in 1852, conducted by the composer, encouraged Liszt further, though he still hesitated, writing Princess Carolyne von Sayn-Wittgenstein, "Anything having to do with Goethe is dangerous for me to handle." However, the final catalyst for the symphony came in a two-month period between August and October 1854. This period coincided with a visit to Weimar by English novelist Mary Ann (Marian) Evans, better known by her pen name George Eliot. Her consort George Henry Lewes was gathering information for his biography of Goethe. During visits to Liszt's residence, the Altenburg, Lewes and Eliot had several discussions with both him and Princess Carolyne about Goethe and his place in German literature. Once Liszt began writing, it was all-consuming; the work was produced in a white heat of inspiration.

The symphony was revised three years after it was completed. Additional parts for heavy brass were added, as was a Chorus Mysticus to the finale; in the latter, words from Faust Part II are sung by a male chorus and a tenor soloist to music from the middle movement. Other minor changes were made but much of the original score remained unchanged. In 1880, Liszt added some ten bars to the second movement.

=== Performance history ===
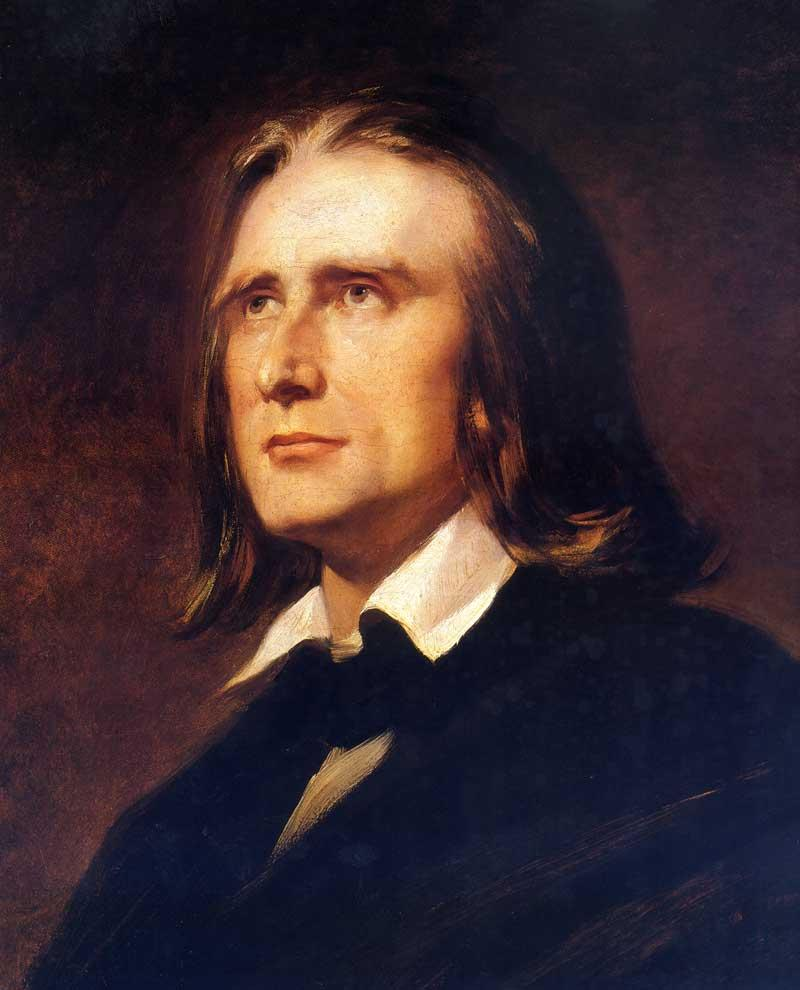
Portrait of Franz Liszt (1856) by Wilhelm von Kaulbach

After its première under Liszt's baton in 1857, the symphony (in its revised version with final chorus and tenor solo) received a second performance under Hans von Bülow in 1861, the year the score was published. Richard Wagner witnessed the performance in Weimar: "Bülow, who had been chosen to conduct Liszt’s Faust Symphony, seemed to me the wildest of all. His activity was extraordinary. He had learned the entire score by heart, and gave us an unusually precise, intelligent, and spirited performance with an orchestra composed of anything but the pick of German players." In later years von Bülow was highly critical of the work: "I have given that nonsense a thorough going-over! It was indescribably painful. It's sheer rubbish, absolute non-music! I don't know which was greater, my horror or my disgust! Suffice it to say that to cleanse my palate I picked up Ivan the Terrible [by Anton Rubinstein] – it seemed like pure Brahms, by comparison! No, Faust is an aberration: let us drop the subject once and for all." Thereafter, apart from one or two sporadic performances, the symphony was neglected for roughly 50 years. Lack of interest was so great that the orchestral parts were not published until 1874. Felix Weingartner became the work's first modern interpreter (giving a performance with the Berlin Staatskapelle in 1892) but he stood practically alone in his advocacy of the score until modern times, when Thomas Beecham and Leonard Bernstein, among others, began championing the piece. Paul Paray also featured the piece in a performance with the Detroit Symphony Orchestra in 1967.

=== Transcriptions ===
Liszt transcribed the complete score for two pianos, and the middle movement alone ("Gretchen") for solo piano. The transcription of 'Gretchen' was recorded by Leslie Howard as part of his set of complete recordings of Liszt's solo piano music, and later by Jeno Jando for Naxos, Imogen Cooper for Chandos Records and Lucille Chung for Signum Records.

Following Liszt's tradition of transcribing orchestral works such as Beethoven's nine symphonies, the Hungarian pianist Ervin Nyiregyházi transcribed the Faust Symphony for solo piano, which he performed at a recital in Novato, California on 30 April 1978. More recently, part of August Stradal's solo piano arrangement of the Faust Symphony has been recorded.
