= Étude Op. 10, No. 1 (Chopin) =

Étude written by Chopin

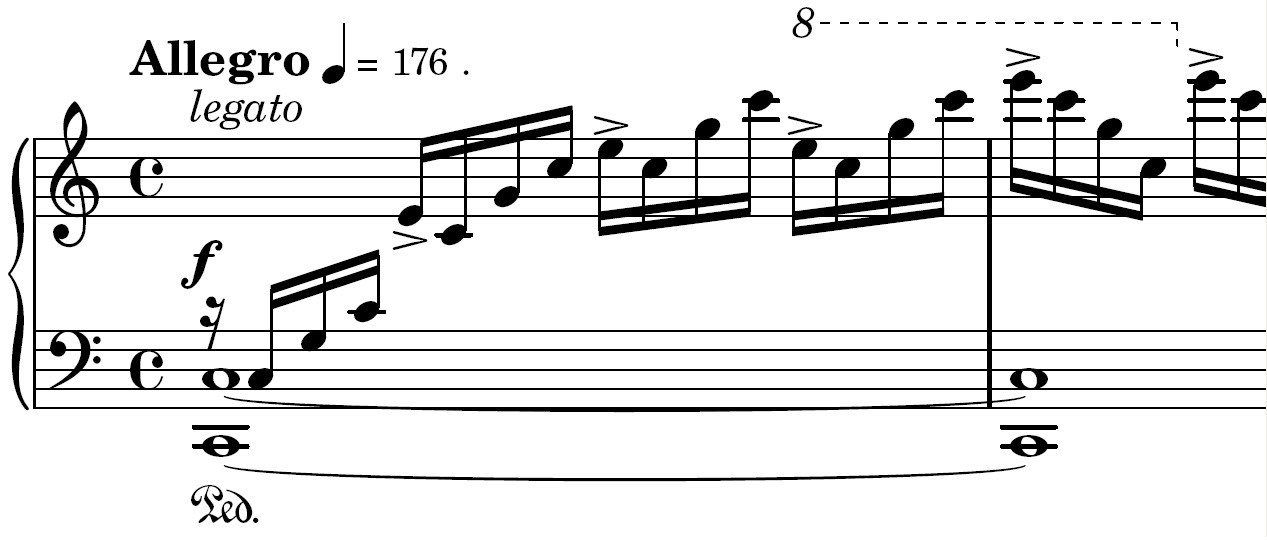
Excerpt from Étude Op. 10, No. 1

Étude Op. 10, No. 1 in C major is a study for solo piano composed by Frédéric Chopin in 1829. It was first published in 1833 in France, Germany, and England as the first piece of his Études Op. 10. This study in reach and arpeggios focuses on stretching the fingers of the right hand. The American music critic James Huneker (1857–1921) compared the "hypnotic charm" that these "dizzy acclivities and descents exercise for eye as well as ear" to the frightening staircases in Giovanni Battista Piranesi's prints of the Carceri d'invenzione. Renowned virtuoso pianist Vladimir Horowitz, who refused to perform this étude in public, said, "For me, the most difficult one of all (the études) is the C Major, the first one, Op. 10, No. 1."

== Structure and stylistic traits ==
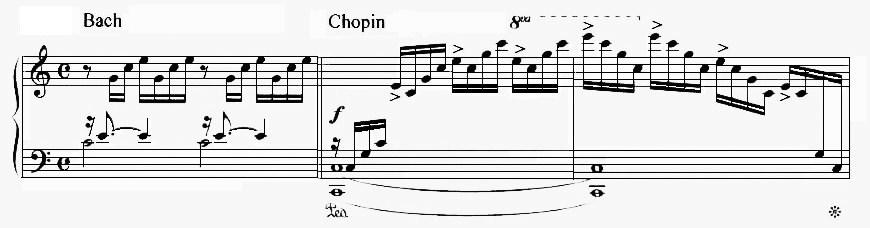
Comparison of Bach's Prelude No. 1 in C major (BWV 846) with Chopin's Étude Op. 10, No. 1

The étude, like most études by Chopin, is in ternary form (A–B–A), recapitulating the first part. The first part of the middle section introduces chromaticism in the left hand octave melody while the second one modulates to the C major recapitulation via an extended circle of fifths.

James Huneker states that Chopin wished to begin the "exposition of his wonderful technical system" with a "skeletonized statement" and compares the étude to a "tree stripped of its bark."

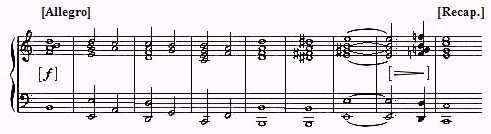
Excerpt of harmonic reduction (bars 41–49: circle of fifths leading to recapitulation) after Carl Czerny

Its harmonies resemble a chorale and its relationship to Bach's Prelude No. 1 in C major (BWV 846) from The Well-Tempered Clavier has been noted by musicologist Hugo Leichtentritt (1874–1951), among others. A fictional example of Chopin's harmonies with Bach's figuration and vice versa is given by British musicologist Jim Samson (born 1946). A harmonic reduction ("ground melody") of the work can already be found in Carl Czerny's School of Practical Composition, Op. 600.

The work is to be executed at an Allegro tempo. Chopin's metronome marking, given in the original sources, is MM 176 referring to quarter notes. The time signature common time is according to the first French, English, and German editions. A copy by Józef Linowski of Chopin's autograph reads cut time (alla breve). A slower tempo ( = 152) has been suggested by later editors such as Hans von Bülow who feared that at = 176 "the majestic grandeur [would be] impaired." There is no Maestoso indication by Chopin though. Unlike Op. 10, No. 4, which reaches fff, this one stays in f throughout and never once reaches ff. Both right hand arpeggios and left hand octaves are to be played legato throughout.

== Technical difficulties ==
Étude Op. 10, No. 1
Performed by Martha Goldstein on an Érard (1851)

Étude Op. 10, No. 1
Performed by Carlos Gardels

Chopin - Etude Op. 10, No. 1
MIDI rendition by Bernd Krüger

Chopin's pupil, Friederike Müller, quotes Chopin:

You shall benefit from this Etude. If you learn it according to my instructions it will expand your hand and enable you to perform arpeggios like strokes of the [violin] bow. Unfortunately, instead of teaching, it frequently un-teaches everything.

In Robert Schumann's 1836 article on piano études in Neue Zeitschrift für Musik, the study is classified under the category "stretches: right hand" (Spannungen. Rechte Hand). The novelty of this étude is its broad right hand arpeggios in sixteenth notes. These nonstop arpeggios, based mostly on chords of a tenth and covering up to six octaves, surpass the drier octave arpeggios of earlier piano composers such as Ludwig van Beethoven, Muzio Clementi or Carl Czerny in richness of overtones as well as in difficulty. The left hand plays a melody in slow legato octaves.

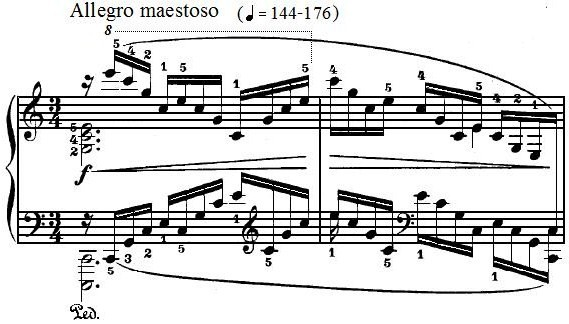
Godowsky's first version of Chopin Op. 10 No. 1, publ. 1899 (opening)

The main technical difficulty of this piece is playing the uninterrupted right hand arpeggios, including the swift position changes, in legato powerfully and accurately at the suggested tempo ( = 176) without straining the hand. The momentum of the motion has to be transferred by the outer hand and the fifth finger to the accentuated top notes. French pianist Alfred Cortot (1877–1962) states that the first difficulty to overcome is "stretch and firmness in shifting the hand over nearly the whole length of the keyboard." Exercises introduced by Cortot, Gottfried Galston and Alfredo Casella deal mostly with stretch and anticipation of position changes. Ferruccio Busoni in his Klavierübung introduces an exercise for two hands in contrary motion, somewhat reminiscent of Leopold Godowsky. Australian pianist Alan Kogosowski warns against straining the right hand by constant overstretching. To avoid strain, the first note of the position "must be released like a hot potato," and the hand "should move quickly and laterally, without stretching, from the first note to the next note and the next position."

== Paraphrases ==
Godowsky's arrangement
MIDI rendition by Bernd Krüger

Leopold Godowsky's 53 Studies on Chopin's Études include two versions. The first one arranges the sixteenth notes arpeggios for both hands in contrary motion and changes the time signature to 3/4. The second version in D♭ major gives two voices to be played entirely with the left hand alone. The time signature is 2 × 4/4.

Friedrich Wührer inverts the hands in his arrangement, giving the arpeggios to the left hand.

In 1978, Keith Emerson used the first eight bars as the basis for "Love at First Sight" on Love Beach by Emerson, Lake & Palmer. After Emerson performs the introduction on the piano, the rest of the band joins him using Chopin's harmonic structure for their song.
