= Étude Op. 10, No. 7 (Chopin) =

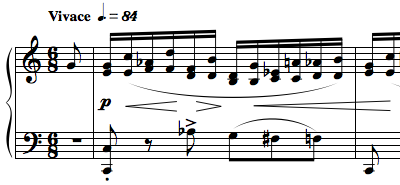
Excerpt from Étude Op. 10, No. 7

Étude Op. 10, No. 7, in C major, is a solo piano technical study composed by Frédéric Chopin around 1830 – 1832 and published in 1833. The tempo Vivace indicates a lively playing speed.

== Structure ==
Conforming with most of the others, Étude Op. 10, No. 7 consists of three sections. The first theme in C major is followed by a short second theme in D major, which returns to the first theme. It is an exercise in intervals, with the right hand constantly changing from minor thirds to augmented sixths, in quick sixteenth note rhythm, while the left hand plays a simple bass harmonious accompaniment.

Étude No. 7
Martha Goldstein playing on an Erard (1851) - 1.72 MB

== Technique ==
In order to be melodically pleasing, Étude Op. 10, No. 7 demands a special technique, as the interpretation of its melodic line is not as easy as the more popular études by Chopin; consequently, it is not a standard in concert repertoire. However, technicians, in particular Abby Whiteside, favored this piece for its note structure and challenging execution. She states that it is impossible to play this without following her pedagogy, demanding that each note be played by action of the upper arms. It is, however, possible to master it without following her methodology.
