= List of compositions by Anton Rubinstein =

Selected list of the compositions of Anton Rubinstein.

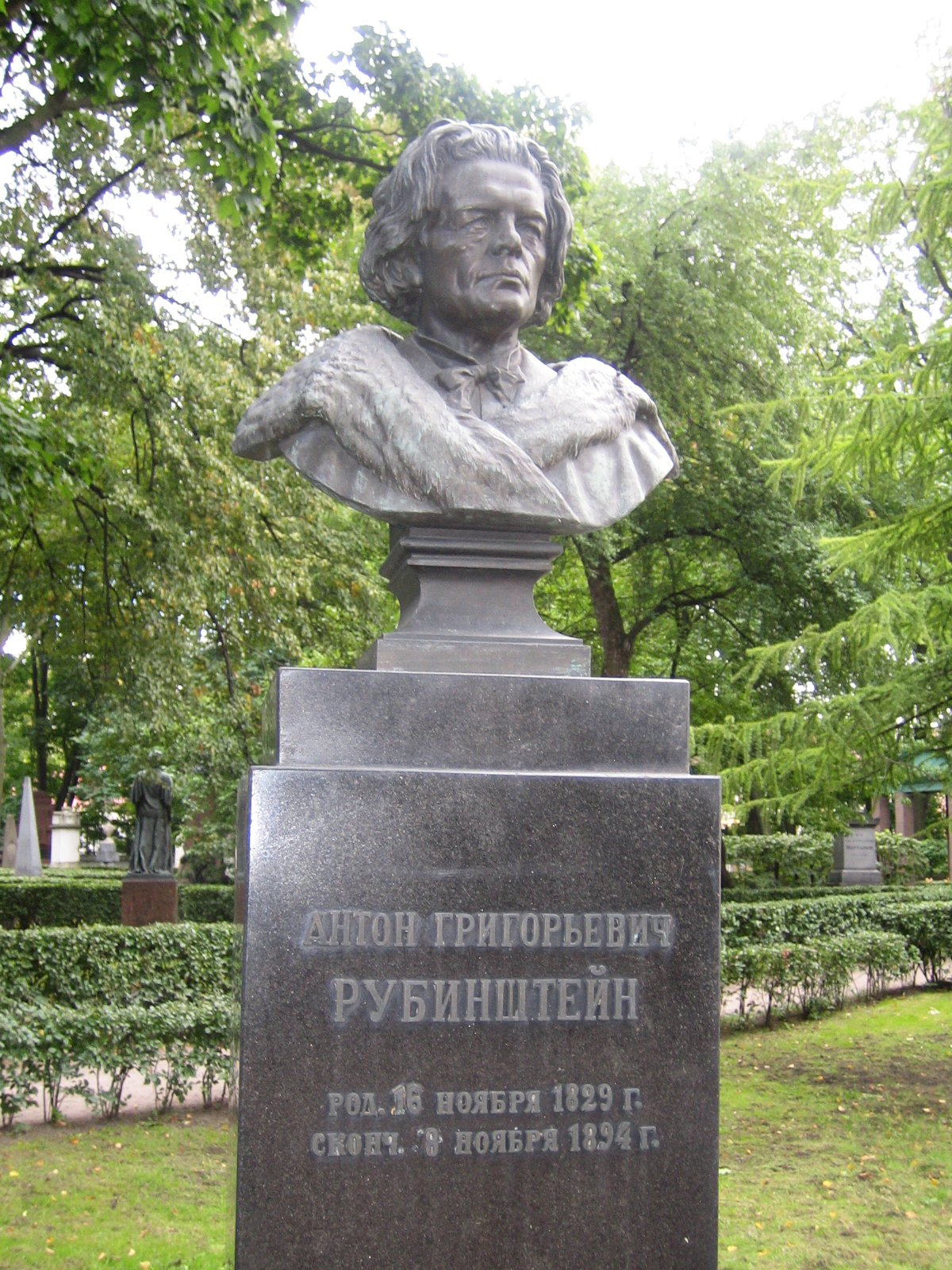

== Orchestral works ==
=== Symphonies ===
- Symphony No. 1 in F major, Op. 40 (1849 or 1850)
- Symphony No. 2 in C major Ocean, Op. 42 (1851, original 4-mvt version) (1863, revised 6-mvt version) (1880, final 7-mvt version)
- [original Symphony No. 3 in B♭ major (1853) - this 4-movement work was performed, but Rubinstein was not satisfied with it and it wasn't published] *
- Symphony No. 3 in A major, Op. 56 (1854-5)
- Symphony No. 4 in D minor Dramatic, Op. 95 (1874)
- Symphony No. 5 in G minor Russian, Op. 107 (1880)
- Symphony No. 6 in A minor, Op. 111 (1886)

* The first movement of this work was later published in 1861 as a standalone "Concert Overture". Two years later, in 1863, the second and third movements were incorporated into the second version of Symphony No. 2. The final movement of this original Symphony no. 3 remains unknown.

=== Other orchestral works ===
- Triumphal Overture in C major, Op. 43 (1855)
- Concert Overture in B♭ major, Op. 60 (1861) (this is the first movement of the original Symphony no. 3 (in B♭ major), which was performed in 1853 but not published)
- Faust, Op. 68, Tone poem, 1864
- Ivan the Terrible, Op. 79 (1869)
- Don Quixote, Op. 87 (1870)
- Eroica Fantasia in F major, Op. 110 (1884)
- Suite in E♭ major, Op. 119 (1894)
- Ouverture Solennelle pour Grand Orchestre, Op. 120 (1894)

== Concertos ==
=== Piano and orchestra ===
- Piano Concerto No. 1 in E minor, Op. 25 (1850, published in 1858)
- Piano Concerto No. 2 in F major, Op. 35 (1851)
- Piano Concerto No. 3 in G major, Op. 45 (written 1853-4, published 1858)
- Piano Concerto No. 4 in D minor, Op. 70 (dedicated to Ferdinand David) (1864)
- Fantasy for piano in C major, Op. 84 (originally for solo piano, 1869; arr. piano and orchestra, 1880)
- Piano Concerto No. 5 in E♭ major, Op. 94 (dedicated to Charles-Valentin Alkan) (written 1874, published 1875)
- Caprice russe in C minor for piano and orchestra, Op. 102 (published 1878?)
- Koncertstück in A♭ major, Op. 113 (published 1889)

=== Other concertos ===
- Violin Concerto in G major, Op. 46 (written 1857, published 1859)
- Cello Concerto No. 1 in A minor, Op. 65 (1864)
- Romance et caprice for Violin and Orchestra, Op. 86 (published 1871)
- Cello Concerto No. 2 in D minor, Op. 96 (1874)

== Solo piano ==
(in publication order)

- Ondine (étude), Op. 1
- Two Melodies, Op. 3 (1. F major; 2. B major)
- Mazurka-Fantasie in G major, Op. 4
- Three Piano Pieces, Op. 5 (1. Polonaise in C minor; 2. Cracovienne in E♭ major; 3. Mazurka in E major)
- Tarantelle in B minor, Op. 6
- Impromptu-caprice in A minor, Op. 7
- Three Voix Intérieures, Op.8 (1. Volkslied in C major; 2. Rêverie in F minor; 3. Impromptu in A major)
- Kamenniy-Ostrov, Op. 10 (set of 24 piano sketches)
- Sonata No. 1 in E minor, Op. 12
- Le Bal. Fantasy for piano in 10 parts. Op. 14. Published in 1855.
- Sonata No. 2 in C minor, Op. 20 (written 1848-1854, published 1855)
- Three Caprices, Op. 21 (1. F♯ major; 2. D minor; 3. E♭ major)
- Three Serenades, Op. 22 (1. F major; 2. G minor; 3. E♭ major)
- Six Études, Op. 23
- Six Préludes, Op. 24
- Two Morceaux, Op. 26 (1. Romance in F major; 2. Impromptu in A minor)
- Two Morceaux, Op. 28 (1. Nocturne in G♭ major; 2. Caprice in E♭ major)
- Two Morceaux, Op. 30 (1. F minor (first Barcarolle); 2. D minor)
- Acrostychon, Op. 37
- Sonata No. 3 in F major, Op. 41
- Six soirées à Saint-Petersburg, Op. 44 (published 1859)
- Barcarolle No. 2 in A minor, Op. 45bis
- Six Pièces caractéristiques, Op. 50
- Six fugues (en style libre) introduites de préludes pour piano, Op. 53
- Cinq morceaux, Op. 69
- Three Morceaux, Op. 71 (1. Nocturne in A♭ major; 2. Mazurka in F minor; 3. Scherzo in D♭ major)
- Album de Peterhof, Op. 75.
- Fantasy in E minor, Op. 77 (a massive one-movement free-form sonata more than forty minutes in length)
- Six Études, Op. 81
- Seven National Dances, Op. 82
- Fantasy in C major, Op. 84 (originally for solo piano, 1869; arr. piano and orchestra, 1880)
- Theme and 12 Variations, G major, Op. 88 (a massive work, comparable to the sonatas, more than forty minutes in length)
- Twelve Verschiedene Stücke, Op. 93
- Sonata No. 4 in A minor, Op. 100
- Six morceaux, Op. 104
- Second Acrostychon pour le piano, Op. 114
- Six Souvenir de Dresde, Op. 118
- Barcarolle No. 4 in G major (1858)
- Étude sur des notes fausses (Étude on false notes), C major, no Op. number, (1868)
- Waltz-Caprice in E♭ major (1870)

== Two pianos ==
- Bal costumé Op. 103 - 20 pieces for two pianos (1879)
- Fantasy in F minor Op. 73 for two pianos (1864)

== Chamber works ==
=== With piano ===
- Octet for piano, strings and winds in D minor, Op. 9 (from a first attempt at a piano concerto and entitled 'Concerto di camera' ).
- Piano Trio No. 1 in F major, Op. 15
- Piano Trio No. 2 in G minor, Op. 15
- Piano Trio No. 3 in B♭ major, Op. 52
- Piano Trio No. 4 in A major, Op. 85
- Piano Trio No. 5 in C minor, Op. 108
- Quartet for Piano and Strings in C major, Op. 66
- Quintet for Piano and Strings in G minor, Op. 99
- Quintet for Piano and Winds in F major, Op. 55
- 9 Salon Pieces (9 Салонных пьес) for violin, or viola, or cello, and piano, Op. 11; originally only 3 pieces written for each instrument, later all 9 works transcribed by the composer for each of the 3 instruments
- Sonata for Cello and Piano No. 1 in D major, Op. 18 (1852)
- Sonata for Cello and Piano No. 2 in G major, Op. 39 (1857)
- Sonata for Piano Four-Hands in D major, Op. 89
- Sonata for Viola and Piano in F minor, Op. 49 (written 1855, published 1857)
- Sonata for Violin and Piano No. 1 in G major, Op. 13
- Sonata for Violin and Piano No. 2 in A minor, Op. 19
- Sonata for Violin and Piano No. 3 in B minor, Op. 98
- Three Character Pieces for Piano Four-Hands, Op. 9
- Six character pictures (Character-Bilder) for Piano Four-Hands Op. 50.

=== Without piano ===
- Quintet for Strings in F major, Op. 59 (arranged also as Piano Quartet).
- Sextet for Strings in D major Op. 97
- Three quartets, Op. 17 (in G major, C minor and F major).
- Three quartets, Op. 47 (in E minor, B♭ major, and D minor).
- Two quartets, Op. 90. (in G minor and E minor). (about 1860.)
- Two quartets, Op. 106 (in A♭ major and F minor).

== Stage works ==
=== Operas ===
- Dmitry Donskoy. 1849/50.
- Vengeance (1852?) - lost
- The Siberian Hunters (Sibirskiye okhotniki). 1852. (premiered 1854 under Franz Liszt's baton)
- Fomka the Fool
- Die Kinder der Heide (Children of the Steppes) (premiered 1861 in Vienna.)
- Feramors. 1862.
- The Demon. 1871.
- Die Maccabäer. 1872-4.
- Néron. 1875-6.
- The Merchant Kalashnikov. 1877-9., (premiered 1880)
- Unter Räubern, 1883.
- Der Papagei. (The Parakeet.) 1884.
- Gorjuša (The Sorrowful One) 1888

=== Sacred operas and oratorios ===
- Der Thurm zu Babel, Op. 80. 1870. (Sacred opera in one act)
- Sulamith. 1882/3. (Biblical representation) Hamburg 1883
- Das verlorene Paradies, Op. 54. (sacred opera) (Libretto written by 1855?)review (published by Leipzig : Bartholf Senff, around 1860. Text freely after John Milton)
- Moses, Op. 112. (sacred opera), Riga 1894
- Christus, Op. 117. (sacred opera), Bremen 1895
- Cain (unfinished) (sacred opera)

=== Ballet ===
- Die Rebe (La vigne, The Grapevine) (1881) (staged 1893 by Emil Graeb for the Court Opera Ballet in Berlin)

== Vocal works ==
=== Lieder ===
- Numerous sets including
  - Neun Lieder von Kolzoff, aus dem Russischen von A. von Viedert ... für eine Singstimme mit Begleitung des Pianoforte, Op. 27. (about 1855)
  - 6 Lieder from Heine for voice and piano, Op. 32
  - 6 Lieder for voice and piano, Op. 33
  - 12 Persian Songs, Op. 34
  - 12 Lieder for voice and piano, Op. 36
  - 6 Lieder for voice and piano, Op. 72
  - 6 Lieder for voice and piano, Op. 76
  - 10 Lieder, Op. 83 (from the French, Italian and English)

=== Other vocal works ===
- Scena ed Aria "E dunque ver? - Ist es denn wahr?", Op. 58 (for Soprano with the accompaniment of Orchestra or Piano),
- Die Nixe, Op. 63 (for chorus of women's voices and alto solo, with accompaniment of a piano or orchestra)
- Two songs for chorus and orchestra (Hecuba and Hagar in der Wüste) Op. 92

== Books ==
- Rubinstein, Anton (1891). Die Musik und Ihre Meister: eine Unterredung. Leipzig: B. Senff. OCLC 9661963.

== Worklists in print ==
- Sitsky, Larry (1998). Anton Rubinstein: an annotated catalog of piano works and biography. Westport, CT: Greenwood Press. ISBN 0-313-25497-4. OCLC 39162282.
