= Alan Kogosowski =

Australian classical pianist

- Born: Abraham Kogosowski; 22 December 1952 (age 73); Melbourne, Australia
- Occupation: Classical pianist
- Website: www.kogosowski.com

Alan Kogosowski (born 22 December 1952) is an Australian classical pianist.

== Biography ==
Abraham (Alan) Kogosowski was born in Melbourne to Hanna (née Prager) and Izio (Izzy) Kogosowski. From the age of six he played the piano for ten hours a day. He won a number of competitions and prizes, including the Australian television talent quest "BP Showcase" in 1966, when aged only 13. He made his first tour at age thirteen, including a performance on The Ed Sullivan Show in New York City.

Kogosowski studied with Roy Shepherd at the Melbourne University Conservatorium of Music and he was awarded a Churchill Fellowship, being the youngest person ever to receive this award. This enabled him to study in Paris at the École Normale de Musique, where his teacher was Blanche Bascourret de Guéraldi, a former student of Alfred Cortot. He then studied in London with Peter Katin and Michel Block, achieving a Licentiate from the Royal College of Music. He had further studies in Warsaw. His New York and London debuts, at Lincoln Center and the Wigmore Hall, were enthusiastically received.

At the age of 21, shortly after returning to Australia, he was involved in a car accident, breaking the bones of his right hand; there were fears he could even lose the hand. It was saved through the skill of Dr Frank Ham, a Melbourne plastic surgeon. He was able to return to the concert stage after only a few months, playing Ravel's Concerto for the Left Hand, with the Melbourne Symphony Orchestra under Leonard Dommett. After 18 months he had regained full use of the right hand.

Kogosowski has developed a method of helping people affected by carpal tunnel syndrome. After many years of study of the anatomical aspects of piano technique, he has adapted his knowledge of the positioning of the hands and posture at the keyboard to the prevention and remedy of this condition. He has also designed a computer keyboard and mouse that encourage hands and fingers to droop in a natural curved pose over the workstation instead of stretched flat in a tension-producing deportment. He also published a book on the subject, How to Prevent RSI: a pianist's perspective for everyone.

== Chopin ==
Alan Kogosowski has a special affinity with Frédéric Chopin:

- he has recreated Chopin's final public concert in 1848 in London's Guildhall
- he has written Genius of the Piano, which covers Chopin's life, his contemporaries, and how he avoided strain injuries such as carpal tunnel syndrome. It focuses especially on the correct approach to the Études. It also looks at the history and the art of piano playing
- he has produced a 6-part television series about the life and music of Chopin, in which he performs and introduces a wide cross-section of his key works. This was first broadcast in New York in 2003
- he accompanied the soprano Irena Grainge in the first Australian recording of Chopin's 19 Polish Songs sung in their original language
- he received praise from Pope John Paul II for his playing of Chopin
- he has performed in a play about Chopin and George Sand, written by the actress and writer Diana Douglas
- he created a work that he has named "Chopin's Piano Concerto No. 3 in A major". He premiered the piece on 8 October 1999, with Neeme Järvi and the Detroit Symphony Orchestra. The opening movement was based on the Allegro de concert in A, Op. 46 (a piece for solo piano that Chopin may indeed have salvaged and reworked from a projected but unfinished third concerto), as restructured, orchestrated and augmented by Kogosowski. For the slow second movement, he arranged the Nocturne in C-sharp minor, Op. posth. Lento con gran espressione, for piano and orchestra. The finale was created out of the Bolero, Op. 19, which has a typical rondo form of a third movement, and a ready-made cadenza.

He conceived and for ten years hosted a series of musical evenings in London, known as "Schubertiades at Sotheby's", with guest artists from all over the world. Members of the British royal family including Diana, Princess of Wales and the Queen Mother often attended, and he performed on many occasions for them after he became friends with Princess Diana.

In 2001 he became Artistic Advisor to the Palm Beach Symphony in Florida, which he has conducted on various occasions.

Kogosowski has orchestrated Sergei Rachmaninoff's Piano Trio in D minor (Trio élégiaque), Op. 9, as a piano concerto, called Concerto Élégiaque in D minor, Op. 9b. This has also been recorded by Neeme Järvi and the Detroit Symphony, with Kogosowski as soloist. The recording, on the Chandos label, was named Best Recording of the Year in 1994 by the American Record Guide.

== Honours ==
In 1999, Alan Kogosowski was honored by the Polish branch of the Order of the Knights of Malta with a special decoration in recognition of his many all-Chopin recitals in London, and series of Chopin concerts to raise funds for medicines to be sent to Poland.
