= New German School =

Music movement in the 19th century

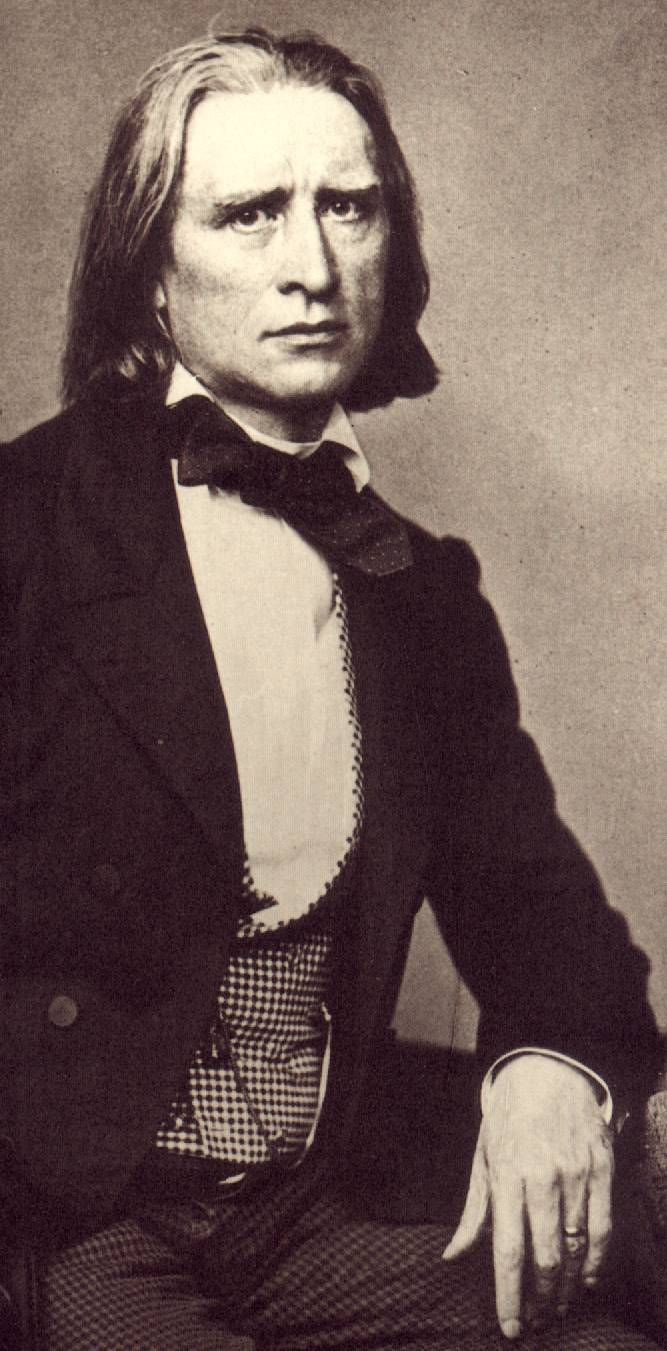
Franz Liszt, one of the principal animators of the 'New German School'. Detail of a photo by Franz Hanfstaengl, 1858

The New German School (German: Neudeutsche Schule, pronounced [ˈnɔʏdɔʏtʃə ˈʃuːlə]) is a term introduced in 1859 by Franz Brendel, editor of the Neue Zeitschrift für Musik, to describe certain trends in German music. Although the term has frequently been used in essays and books about music history of the 19th and early 20th centuries, a clear definition is complex.

In addition, those held to be representatives of the "New German School" are not all practising musicians. The term is thus problematic. It has been used by different persons at different times with different meanings. It is generally agreed that Franz Liszt and Richard Wagner were among the most prominent representatives of the "New German School". There is also a consensus that Johannes Brahms did not take part. Beyond this, interpretations differ. The present article sets out the main elements associated with this term.

Representatives of the New German School conflicted with more conservative musicians in the so-called War of the Romantics.

== The Tonkünstler-Versammlung of 1859 ==
In 1858 Franz Liszt and Franz Brendel projected a Musician's Congress (Ge: Tonkünstler-Versammlung). The necessary funding came from a stipend of 1,000 thaler from Friedrich Wilhelm Konstantin, Prince of Hohenzollern-Hechingen, which Liszt had negotiated. It was also Liszt who had made suggestions for the musical performances at the congress. It is no cause for surprise that Liszt himself was the most frequently performed contemporary composer at the event, and that members of his circle at Weimar were well represented.

The third day of the Tonkünstler-Versammlung, 3 June, was opened by Brendel with a speech "Zur Anbahnung einer Verständigung" (En: "To open the way to an agreement"). Brendel's speech is the origin of the term "New German School". It was published as printed version in the Neue Zeitschrift für Musik of 10 June 1859.

Brendel recalled Robert Schumann, who had founded the Neue Zeitschrift für Musik to open the way for a new kind of art, derived from Beethoven's works. While Schumann had taken an artist's view, his writings had been purely subjective. In many cases Schumann's view had been dependent on transient emotions evoked by music. Brendel had a loftier aim. He had evolved distinct musical principles and kept to them. The Neue Zeitschrift für Musik had become the voice for progressive attitudes in contemporary musical life. As consequence, there had been conflict with other parties, rising to a pitch reminiscent of religious fanaticism of former times.

Masters of recent years had proved to Brendel by their achievements that he had not been in error. Brendel mentioned by name only Wagner, who had wonderfully realized the ideal of the pure German opera, but he also mentioned two others. While Brendel did not explicitly cite their names, from the context it is clear that Berlioz and Liszt were intended. According to Brendel in his essay F. Liszt's symphonische Dichtungen of 1858, it was his conviction that Liszt's Symphonic Poems were the most perfect ideal of instrumental music of that time. They were what had to come if progress was to be gained. In contrast to this, the Symphonies of Schubert, Mendelssohn and Schumann, however magnificent and beautiful they were, could only be regarded as the works of epigones [disciples, i.e. after Beethoven].

=== Introduction of the term 'New German School' ===
See also Music of the Future for additional background.

To improve future debates, Brendel made several suggestions; in particular, that in future, use of the term Zukunftsmusik (En: Music of the Future) should be avoided. The term had been derived from Wagner's essay The Artwork of the Future, but none fully subscribed to the ideas Wagner set out there about his ideals for music drama. Wagner's exaggerated and combative style meant that many whom he had attacked had wanted to defend themselves. This had caused heated debates, not excluding pettiness and personal insults. Instead of continuing to use the term "Zukunftsmusik", with its connotations of past struggles, Brendel suggested using "Neudeutsche Schule". The new term should be understood as denoting the whole period since Beethoven's death. According to Brendel, it was common usage to call the period of J. S. Bach and Händel "alt deutsche Schule" ("Old German School"). The subsequent period was that of Viennese masters such as Haydn and Mozart who had been influenced by the Italian style. Beethoven had redirected interest to the German North (Saxony and Thuringia) again and with this had opened the "Neudeutsche Schule".

=== Berlioz and Liszt as 'German' masters ===
According to Brendel, there had been a further reason for the heated debates of the past. People had discussed new works without actually knowing them. For this reason Brendel had arranged the musical performances of the Tonkünstler-Versammlung. Those musicians present could judge for themselves by listening to the works. Since there was no doubt that – in Brendel's sense – the performed works should represent the "New German School", it could be considered as embarrassing that also works by the Frenchman Berlioz and by Liszt, born in Hungary and usually regarded as Hungarian (albeit of German ancestry), had been performed.

Brendel admitted the problem but tried to show that Berlioz and Liszt were to be viewed as German masters. For this purpose he recalled his own Geschichte der Musik ("History of music"). According to this, there had been two parallel lines of development. On the one hand, there had been a specific German line, represented by J. S. Bach, Beethoven and others. On the other hand, there had been a universal line, combining German, Italian and French influences, and represented by Händel, Gluck, Mozart and others.

According to Brendel, no one doubted that all these artists were Germans. But there had been masters such as Cherubini, Spontini, Méhul and many others. Although they were born in Italy or France, they had become great artists through German influence. For this reason they could be regarded as German masters. Both Berlioz and Liszt would not have become those artists they actually were, had they not early fed themselves with German spirit and had grown strong with it. The root of their works therefore had to be found in Germany.

=== Liszt's understanding of the "New German School" ===
While Brendel in his speech had said that the "New German School" was intended to unite different parties of musical life, the journal Grenzboten of 10 June 1859, wrote:

The anniversary of the Neue Zeitschrift für Musik, well known as voice of the "Zukunftsmusiker", who now have officially constituted themselves as "Weimarian School", was an occasion for a very voluminous demonstration, for which that school enfolded all of its forces.

This suggested that the advantage was very much on the side of the "Weimarian School". There is a parallel in Liszt's will of 14 September 1860. Liszt wrote:

I ask her [Princess Wittgenstein] also to send to several members of our brotherhood of the New German School, to whom I remain attached – Hans von Bronsart (Leipzig), Richard Pohl (Weimar), Alexander Ritter (Schwerin), Felix Draeseke (Dresden), Prof. Weitzmann (Berlin), Carl Tausig (from Warsaw), and a few others whom Carolyne will decide upon – perhaps one of my objects, or a ring with my monogram on it, or my portrait, or my coat-of-arms, in memory of me. May they continue the work we have begun! This cause cannot be lost, were it only to have rare defenders!

A somewhat more precise impression can be gained from Liszt's letter to the Prince of Hohenzollern-Hechingen, of 18 August 1858, regarding a stipend of 1,000 thaler offered by the latter to support Liszt's activities.

In order to fulfill its task of progress, the Neue Zeitschrift fur Musik has not spared its editor either in efforts or sacrifices. By the fact that it represents, in a talented and conscientious manner, the opinions and sympathies of my friends and myself, it is in the most advanced, and consequently the most perilous, position of our musical situation; therefore our adversaries lose no opportunity of raising difficulties for it. Our opinions and sympathies will be sustained, I doubt not, by their worth and conviction; but if Your Highness condescends to come to our aid, we shall be both proud and happy – and it is by spreading our ideas through the Press that we can best strengthen our position.

According to a document of 1858, written by Brendel and signed by Liszt, the 1,000 thaler stipend should be spent in part on "enlightening public opinion", for example with the help of the daily press, with regard to "modern tasks of musical art", i.e. for the purpose of permanent propaganda in favour of Liszt and his friends.

== Contemporary reactions ==
=== Consequences of the Tonkünstler-Versammlung ===
Richard Pohl reviewed the Tonkünstler-Versammlung in the Neue Zeitschrift für Musik, extensively praising Liszt and his works. In spite of Pohl's review, the question whether the musical part of the Tonkünstler-Versammlung was a victory or at least a success for Liszt remains open. Wagner had already taken a sceptical point of view regarding such events two years earlier, writing in a letter to Hans von Bülow,

Go to the devil, all of you, with your sow music festivals and musical horse-races: you let the one side throw flowers, and the other side throw mud at yourselves! Doing such things, where not even genuinely good performances can be obtained, what can possibly come from it? Nothing pure but much dirt! And for this, venturing the last rest of an entirely shattered health, – and at Liszt's age and with his experiences of the world!

After the Tonkünstler-Versammlung in Leipzig some of Liszt's letters show him in a bitter mood. An example is the letter to Weitzmann of 4 February 1860, stating that Liszt had advised several conductors not to perform his Symphonic Poems. His entire line of thought was incorrect, and all of his compositions were to be withdrawn. The opposition of the press meant that Liszt wanted to sever his connections with the public.

However Liszt had also himself to blame for such opposition. Throughout the 1850s, in a manner until then unparalleled in music history, Liszt himself and his friends had, in more than half a dozen journals, bombarded the contemporary public with huge quantities of articles, many of them in aggressive polemical style, in favour of their intended transformation of art. In addition there were books, such as Hans von Bronsart's Musikalische Pflichten ("Musical Duties"), (Leipzig 1858), where adversaries of Liszt and his circle were accused of ill-will, unfairness and slander. After this it should not have been surprising that similar reactions were evoked from the opposite side.

=== Conservative reaction ===
See article War of the Romantics for fuller discussion.

The ideals of Liszt prompted Johannes Brahms to publish in 1860 a Manifesto condemning the partisanship of the Neue Zeitschrift towards Liszt. Other signatories to the manifesto were to include Joseph Joachim and Ferdinand Hiller. This evoked a war of words named by music historians the War of the Romantics, and marked a decisive split in opinions which persisted throughout the century, and is still reflected to some extent today in the concepts of 'classical music' and 'modern music'.

=== Objections of Berlioz ===
If the "New German School" was to be imagined as a group of artists with similar aims, joining Liszt with Wagner was already problematic; but there was still a further problem, regarding Berlioz. Berlioz very decidedly declared in spring 1860, following the concerts given by Wagner at the Parisian Théâtre Italien, that he himself had nothing to do with Wagner's style and ideology. All those who had claimed that he was representative of a joint school together with Wagner were calumniators.

In contrast to Brahms and Joachim in their "Manifesto", Berlioz gave a detailed list of critical points as well as a list of principles he supported. He made use of the term "musique de l'avenir" (music of the future), as a poke against Wagner. Berlioz's polemic against Wagner is instanced by the following:

"Wagner maintains the motto of the witches in Macbeth: 'fair is foul and foul is fair.' "

Others of Berlioz' points were in congruence with Wagner's views. An example to which Berlioz agreed is:

"The composer has to search the inner uniformity of drama and music, has to transpose the emotion of the words, thereby has to have regard to the character of the presented person as well as to the accents of spoken language."

In several cases, however, Berlioz' critical points were aimed not at Wagner's own claims but at Brendel's claims in the Neue Zeitschrift für Musik. In his essay F. Liszt's symphonische Dichtungen and his speech Zur Anbahnung einer Verständigung, Brendel had explained that there was a difference between the beautiful and the characteristic. Strict rules being appropriate for the beautiful were only partly valid for the characteristic. Berlioz characterised this as saying that the composer had in principle to offend against the rules, had to avoid consonant harmonies as well as natural modulations, and had to take care that his music was by no means pleasing. Instead, listeners had to become acquainted with richness of dissonances, horrible modulations and a rhythmical chaos of the middle voices. (Of course, neither Liszt nor Wagner had in their writings claimed anything of the kind)

To calm down the debate, Wagner, in the Journal des Débats of 22 February 1860, published an open letter to Berlioz. He explained, he had written his essay The Artwork of the Future under the impression of the failed revolution of 1848. From the present perspective of 1860, he regretted that publication. Nevertheless, Berlioz remained hostile towards Wagner and also towards Liszt. In his Mémoirs, Liszt is only present as famous virtuoso. Of his works, not a single one is mentioned. The same is to be said regarding the volumes of Berlioz' "Literary works", collections of republished reviews and essays. While in the 1830s and early 1840s there had been reviews in which Berlioz had praised some of Liszt's compositions, especially the Rondeau fantastique El contrabandista and the Fantasies on melodies from the operas La Juive, I Puritani and Robert le diable, every single one of those reviews was excluded from the "Literary works."

Further development of the traditions of the New German School in the period following 1859 is covered in the article Allgemeine Deutsche Musikverein (q.v.)

== Bibliography ==
- Brendel, Franz (1858). "F. Liszt's symphonische Dichtungen". Neue Zeitschrift für Musik. 49: 73–76, 85–88, 97–100, 109–112, 121–123, 133–136 & 141–143.
- Brendel, Franz (1859). "Zur Anbahnung einer Verständigung". Neue Zeitschrift für Musik. 50 (24): 265–273.
- Deaville, James (2006). "Die neudeutsche Musikkritik". In Detlef Altenburg (ed.). Liszt und die Neudeutsche Schule. Weimarer Liszt-Studien. Vol. 3. Laaber, Germany: Laaber-Verlag. pp. 55–76. ISBN 978-3-89007-656-0.
- Lucke-Kaminiarz, Irina (2006). "Der Allgemeine Deutsche Musikverein und seine Tonkünstlerfeste 1859-1886". In Detlef Altenburg (ed.). Liszt und die Neudeutsche Schule. Weimarer Liszt-Studien. Vol. 3. Laaber, Germany: Laaber-Verlag. pp. 221–235. ISBN 978-3-89007-656-0.
- Kleinertz, Rainer (2006). "Zum Begriff "Neudeutsche Schule"". In Detlef Altenburg (ed.). Liszt und die Neudeutsche Schule. Weimarer Liszt-Studien. Vol. 3. Laaber, Germany: Laaber-Verlag. pp. 23–31. ISBN 978-3-89007-656-0.
- Schneider, Herbert (2006). "Wagner, Berlioz und die Zukunftsmusik". In Detlef Altenburg (ed.). Liszt und die Neudeutsche Schule. Weimarer Liszt-Studien. Vol. 3. Laaber, Germany: Laaber-Verlag. pp. 77–95. ISBN 978-3-89007-656-0.
