= Music of the Future =

1860 essay by Richard Wagner

"Music of the Future" ("German: Zukunftsmusik") is the title of an essay by Richard Wagner, first published in French translation in 1860 as "La musique de l'avenir" and published in the original German in 1861. It was intended to introduce the librettos of Wagner's operas to a French audience at the time when he was hoping to launch in Paris a production of Tannhäuser, and sets out a number of his desiderata for true opera, including the need for 'endless melody'. Wagner deliberately put the title in quotation marks to distance himself from the term; Zukunftsmusik had already been adopted, both by Wagner's enemies, in the 1850s, often as a deliberate misunderstanding of the ideas set out in Wagner's 1849 essay, The Artwork of the Future, and by his supporters, notably Franz Liszt. Wagner's essay seeks to explain why the term is inadequate, or inappropriate, for his approach.

== Background ==
=== Early use of the term, and its anti-Wagnerian overtones ===
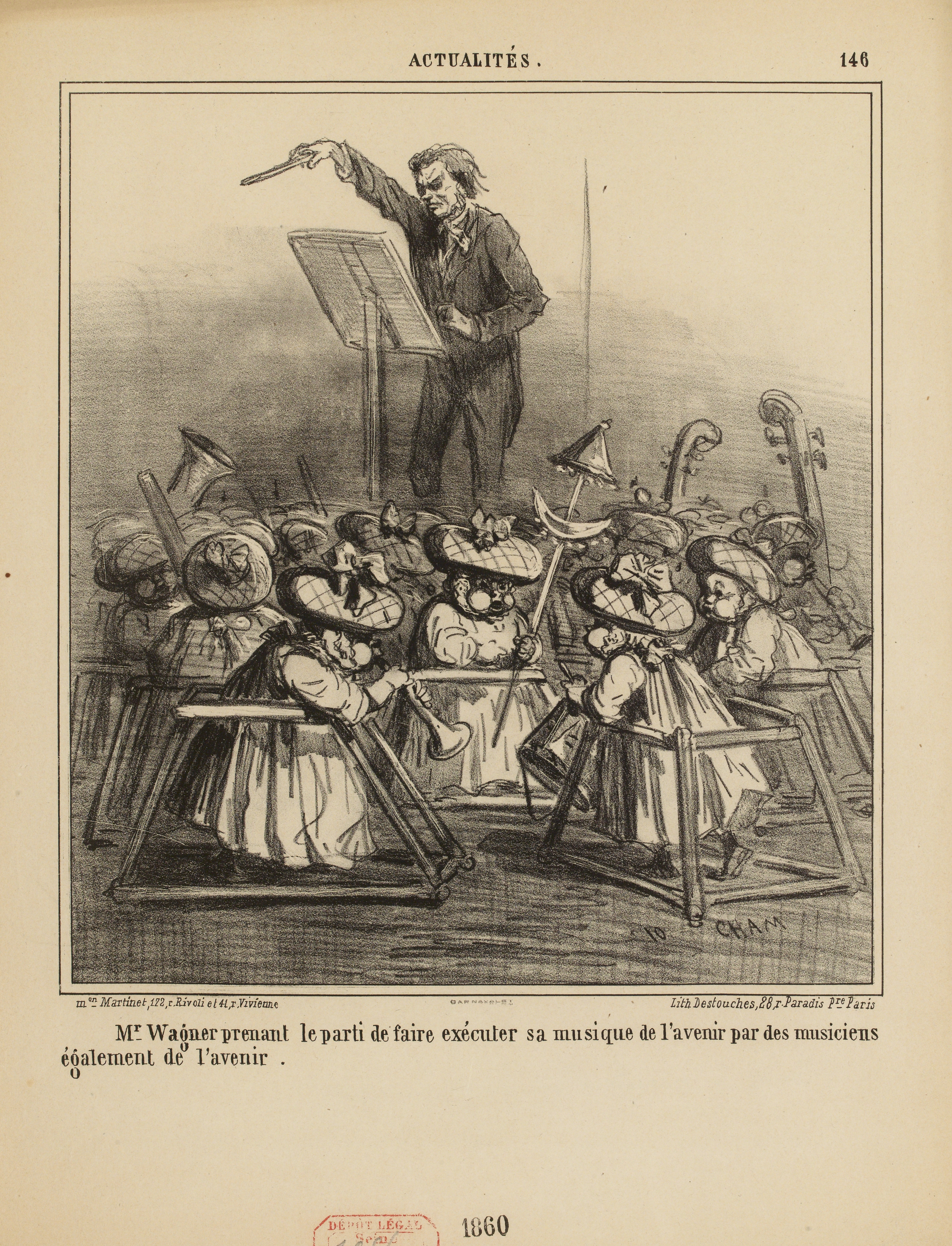
1860 caricature by Cham. The French-language caption says "Mr. Wagner decided to have his music from the future performed by musicians from the future as well".

The earliest public use of the pejorative German term Zukunftsmusik seems to date from 1853, when the music teacher and essayist Friedrich Wieck, Clara Schumann's father, used it in three new chapters (written in 1852) for his collection of essays Clavier und Gesang referring to Wagner, Franz Liszt and their followers. In 1854 a Viennese critic, L. A. Zellner, used it with respect to the music of both Wagner and Robert Schumann; it was also used that year by the composer Louis Spohr. It began to be used in a specifically pejorative sense against Wagner by the editor Ludwig Bischoff, an associate of the conservative Ferdinand Hiller. The term "Musique de l'avenir" was also used in France as an anti-Wagnerian slogan. This is demonstrated by some French caricatures of 1860 and 1861. They appeared in connection with Wagner's concerts on January 25, February 1 and February 8, 1860, at the Parisian Théâtre Italien and performances of his Tannhäuser in March 1861 in Paris, which ended in a debacle. In one of these caricatures an orchestra in front of a stage can be seen. The singers on the stage are two crying babies. The caption explains that the conductor Alphonse Royer had recruited "artistes de l'avenir" ("artists of the future") at an orphanage for a performance of Tannhäuser. In another caricature a conductor asks one of his musicians, to play his part, to which the musician replies (as it is "musique de l'avenir"), he will play it next week. "Musique de l'avenir" thus carried a meaning of musical nonsense.

=== Interpretation of the term by the Weimar school ===
By Wagner's supporters the word "Zukunftsmusik" was used in a larger, and more positive, scope. Typically, this term was used in connection with the aesthetic aims of the circle of artists around Franz Liszt in Weimar, among them Joachim Raff, Hans von Bülow, Peter Cornelius, Rudolph Viole, Felix Draeseke, Alexander Ritter and others. They regarded themselves as "Zukunftsmusiker" ("musicians of the future") with meaning of progressive artists. Since they were well known as propagandists in favour of Wagner's works, Wagner's style was considered as part of "Zukunftsmusik".

Much to Wagner's anger, however, Liszt did not concentrate solely on Wagner's works at Weimar. He also performed works by other contemporary composers, among them Robert Schumann, Ferdinand Hiller, Hector Berlioz, Giacomo Meyerbeer, Anton Rubinstein, Eduard Sobolewski and Giuseppe Verdi. The activities of the circle around Liszt were termed in France as "École anarchique" ("Anarchic School") or "École de Weimar" ("Weimarian School"). Occasionally, Schumann was regarded as a representative of that school, and there are even examples where Felix Mendelssohn Bartholdy was called its originator.

Schumann himself would not have liked to be taken as representative of Wagner's or Liszt's kind of "Zukunftsmusik". In a letter to Joseph Joachim of October 7, 1853, he referred to Liszt as "Judas Iscariot, who might quite well keep preaching at the Ilm"; and in a letter of February 6, 1854, to Richard Pohl, he wrote:

Those who in your view are "Zukunftsmusiker", in my view are "Gegenwartsmusiker"("musicians of the present"); and those who in your view are "Vergangenheitsmusiker" ("musicians of the past") (Bach, Handel, Beethoven), for me they seem to be the best "Zukunftsmusiker" ("musicians of (or for) the future"). I shall never be able to consider spiritual beauty in beautiful forms as an outmoded point of view. Does perhaps Wagner have them? And, after all, where are Liszt's ingenious achievements – where are they on display? Perhaps in his desk? does he perhaps want to wait for the future, since he fears he cannot be understood? right now?

Pohl was a member of Liszt's intimate circle at Weimar. Liszt therefore might have heard of Schumann's opinion, but despite this he shortly afterwards published his Piano Sonata in B Minor with a dedication to Schumann.

=== Divergences between Wagner and Liszt ===
Liszt admired Wagner as composer of genius, but he did not share Wagner's ideas on the "Music of the Future". Liszt's leading idea was to unite poetry and music in works of instrumental music, in symphonic poems and other symphonic works with a "program", subjects of non-musical nature; quite the opposite of Wagner's ideal to unite all the arts in staged music drama. In some of Liszt's essays, for example in that about Berlioz and Harold in Italy, he opposed some of Wagner's views. Wagner meanwhile had given lukewarm support to Liszt's ideas in his 1857 essay "On Franz Liszt's Symphonic Poems, ".

In the beginning of 1859 came a showdown between Liszt and Wagner, whose increasing success led him to feel more independent from his former mentor. Liszt had received in December 1858 the first act of Wagner's Tristan und Isolde with a dedication to him himself. In a letter to Wagner he announced that he would send scores of his Dante Symphony, dedicated to Wagner, and his Gran Mass. He received a letter from Wagner, written from Venice on December 31, 1858, stating that the Weimarians with their idealistic talk about art should leave him alone. They should send money instead, since this was all he needed and wanted to get from them. As answer, Liszt, in a letter of January 4, 1859, wrote, he would return the Tristan act. Besides, since the Dante Symphony and the Gran Mass could not be taken as stocks and bonds, it was superfluous to send such worthless scrip to Venice.

From this point onwards, Liszt sought to establish his musical ideals through the Allgemeiner Deutscher Musikverein (General German Music Union) (q.v.), which he founded with the editor and critic Franz Brendel.

== Origins of Wagner's essay ==
=== Open letter to Berlioz ===
The origins of the essay may be traced to an open letter which Wagner wrote to Berlioz in February 1860, in response to a printed article by Berlioz. Berlioz had poked fun at 'la musique de l'avenir'. In his letter Wagner disclaimed the use of this formulaic term, attributing it to his enemies Hiller and Bischoff, and asserted the principles he had set out in his essay The Artwork of the Future. He also took the opportunity in his letter to flatter Berlioz and to look forward to the premiere of his opera Les Troyens.

=== The essay "Zukunftsmusik" ===
Wagner's essay "Zukunftsmusik" is dated September 1860 and is in the form of a letter to a French admirer, Frédéric Villot. It was intended as a preface to a book of French translations of some of Wagner's libretti, including Tannhäuser and Tristan und Isolde. Wagner's intention was doubtless to familiarise the Parisian public with his ideas on music and opera in advance of performances there which he hoped would secure his fame and fortune; 'a lucid exposition of my thoughts would dispel such prejudice and error'.

== Contents of Wagner's essay ==
In the essay, Wagner recapitulates the ideas he had developed ten years previously in the essays Art and Revolution, The Artwork of the Future and Opera and Drama, placing them in the context of his own autobiographical experiences. He advances his opera libretti as practical examples of his theories. He condemns the artificiality of Italian opera, with its recitatives and repeated arias that break up dramatic flow; he continues his attack on Grand Opera; he denounces German opera as without any style of its own, with a few exceptions (notably Carl Maria von Weber). He takes Beethoven's symphonies as the furthest possible development of instrumental music.

Only Wagner's own vision of music drama, a fusion of poetry and music, can lead to a true development of art. 'Not a Programme can speak the meaning of the Symphony; no, nothing but a stage-performance of the Dramatic Action itself'. Obsession with florid operatic melody is trivial: 'The poet's greatness is mostly to be measured by what he leaves unsaid, letting us breathe in silence to ourselves the thing unspeakable; the musician it is who brings this untold mystery to clarion tongue, and the impeccable form of his sounding silence is endless melody '.

Wagner concedes that "even in the feebler works of frivolous composers [i.e. his former mentor Meyerbeer], I have met with isolated effects that made me marvel at the incomparable might of Music." But only Wagner's determination to ensure concentration of dramatic action and the subvention of music to this aim will produce dramatic art worthy of the name. "In these [...] points you might find the most valid definition of my 'innovations', but by no means in an absolute-musical caprice such as people have thought fit to foist upon me under the name of the 'Music of the Future'."

== Sources ==
- Altenburg, Detlev, ed. (2006). Liszt und die Neudeutsche Schule. Weimarer Liszt-Studien, im Auftrag der Franz-Liszt-Gesellschaft. Laaber.
- Joachim, Josef (1913). A. Moser (ed.). Briefe von und an Joseph Joachim. Berlin.
- Jung, Hans Rudolf, ed. (1988). Franz Liszt in seinen Briefen. Frankfurt am Main.
- Schneider, Herbert. "Wagner, Berlioz und die Zukunftsmusik" in: Altenburg 2006
- Wagner, Richard; Liszt, Franz (1910). Erich Kloss (ed.). Briefwechsel zwischen Wagner und Liszt (3rd expanded ed.). Leipzig.
- Wagner, Richard (1916). Briefe an Hans von Bülow. Jena.
- Wagner, Richard (1995). Judaism in Music, and other essays. Translated by W. Ashton Ellis. Lincoln and London. ISBN 0-8032-9766-1.
