= Liebe =

== People ==
Surname Liebe (German for "love") is a surname that may refer to:

- Carl Christian Vilhelm Liebe (1820–1900), Danish politician
- Christian Liebe (1654–1708), German composer
- Friederich Liebe (1862–1950), Australian building contractor and farmer in Western Australia
- Heinrich Liebe (1908–1997), German naval officer
- Karl Theodor Liebe (1828–1894), German geologist and ornithologist
- Louis Liebe (1819–1900), German conductor and composer
- Otto Liebe (1860–1929), Prime Minister of Denmark

Middle name

- David Liebe Hart (born 1957), American musician, puppeteer and actor

Given name

- Liebe Sokol Diamond (1931–2017), American pediatric orthopedic surgeon

== Film ==
- Love (1927 German film), German title Liebe, a German film
- Love (1956 film), German title Liebe, a West German drama film

== See also ==
- Lieb (disambiguation)
- Leeb, a surname
- Liebing, disambiguation
