= Liebs =

Liebs is a German language patronymic surname derived from Lieb, a nickname for a pleasant or agreeable person. Notable people with the name include:

- Annika Liebs (1979), German swimmer
- Frauke Liebs (1985–2006), German student nurse

== See also ==
- Lieb (disambiguation)
