= Richard Pohl =

German composer (1826–1896)

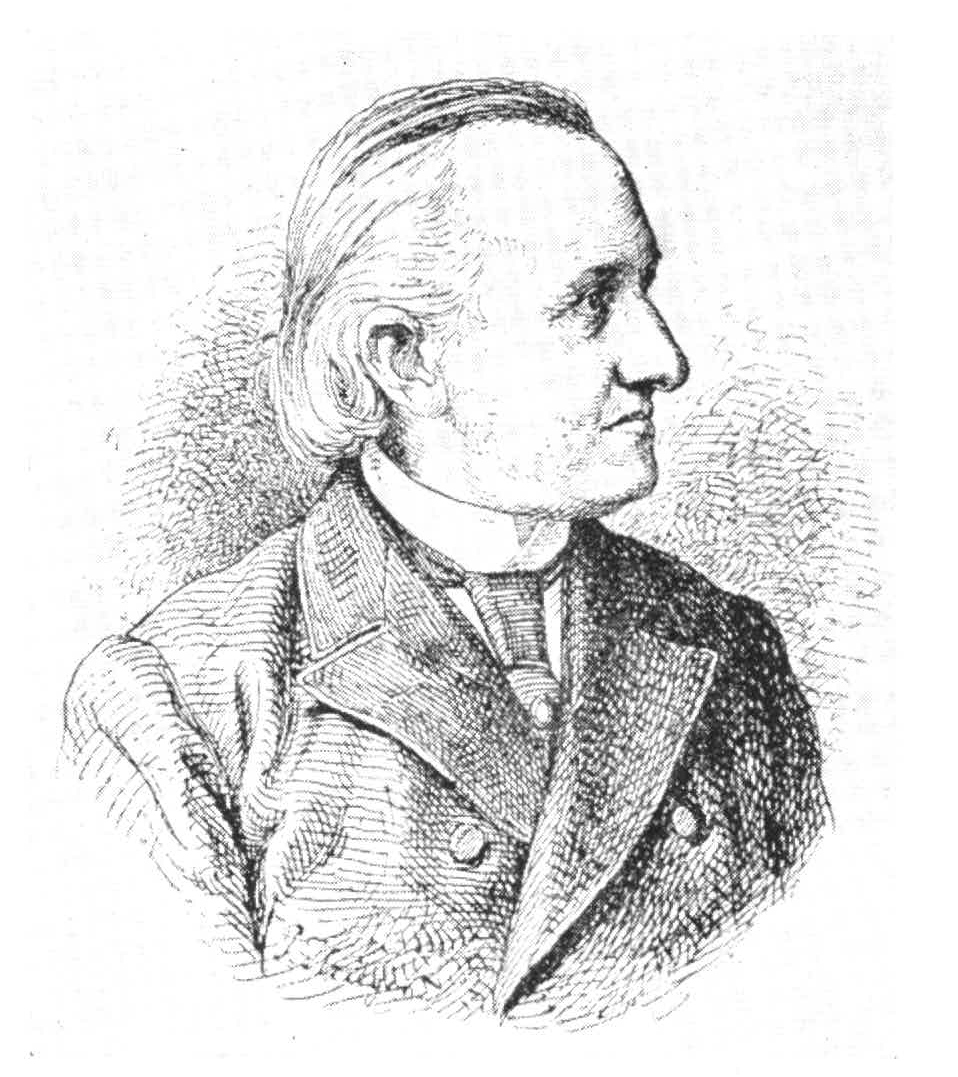
Richard Pohl

Richard Pohl (September 12, 1826 – December 17, 1896) was a German music critic, writer, poet, and amateur composer. He figured prominently in the mid-century War of the Romantics, taking the side opposite Eduard Hanslick, and championing the "Music of the Future" (the progressive Romantic style of Franz Liszt and Richard Wagner).

Pohl was born in Leipzig. He studied physical sciences and philosophy before taking up writing and music criticism; he also acquired some early musical training. While in Leipzig, he became friends with Robert Schumann. Later, after a brief stint teaching at Graz, he moved to Dresden; there he worked on the Neue Musikzeitung between 1852 and 1854. During this period he became involved in the "War of the Romantics," the vitriolic controversy between the relatively conservative branch of the Romantic movement, represented by Brahms, Mendelssohn and others, and the progressive "Music of the Future" trend exemplified by the music of Franz Liszt, Hector Berlioz and especially by the music dramas of Richard Wagner. Pohl was solidly on the side of Wagner. The much more famous critic, Eduard Hanslick, championed Brahms from his post in Vienna as the critic for the prestigious Neue freie Presse.

In 1854 Pohl moved to Weimar, where he became an editor at the Neue Zeitschrift für Musik. He wrote invective-laden articles under the pseudonym "Hoplit" (from the Greek term hoplite, the foot-soldier of ancient Greece) in support of Liszt and Wagner, and critical of music of the more conservative Romantic composers.

While both Liszt and Wagner thanked him for his support, Wagner in particular cooled to Pohl in later years, especially after Pohl's assertion that Wagner borrowed his chromatic harmonies in Tristan und Isolde directly from Liszt.

Among Pohl's other works was a novel based on the life of Richard Wagner.

He retired to Baden-Baden in 1864, and died there.
