= Felix Arndt =

American pianist and composer (1889–1918)

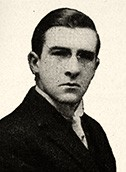
Portrait of Felix Arndt from the Library of Congress

Felix Arndt (May 20, 1889 – October 16, 1918) was an American pianist and composer of popular music. His mother was the Countess Fevrier, who was related to Napoleon III. His father, Hugo Arndt, was Swiss-born.

Educated in New York – his music teachers included Carl Lachmund – Arndt composed songs for vaudevillians Gus Edwards and the team of Jack Norworth and Nora Bayes, and recorded over 3000 piano rolls for Duo-Art and QRS Records.

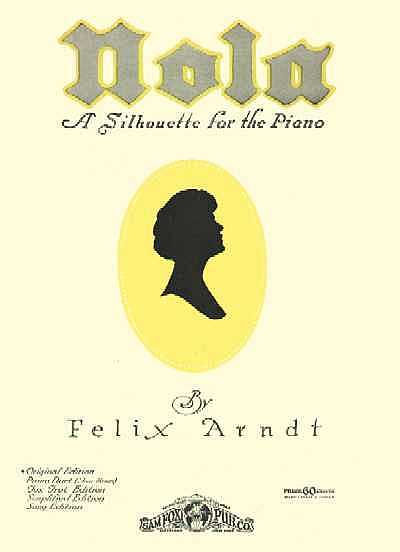
"Nola" sheet music cover

Arndt is best remembered for his 1915 composition "Nola," written as an engagement gift to his fiancée (and later wife), Nola Locke. It is sometimes considered to be the first example of the novelty piano or "novelty ragtime" genre, published by Sam Fox Publishing Company. It was the signature theme of the Vincent Lopez orchestra, and a top ten hit for Les Paul in 1950. A vocal recording by Billy Williams, featuring lyrics by Sunny Skylar, became a minor hit in 1959.

His piano rolls reveal Arndt to be a fine pianist, and he is known to have been an influence on the young George Gershwin, who would visit him at his studio in the Aeolian Building on 42nd Street in Manhattan.

Arndt died in New York City from the 1918 influenza epidemic. He is interred at Sleepy Hollow Cemetery, Sleepy Hollow, New York.

== Piano solos ==
- 71st Regiment – Waltz (1908)
- A Symphonic Nightmare – Desecration Rag No. 1 (1914)
- From Soup to Nuts – One Step Turkey Trot (1914)
- Kakuda – One Step Turkey Trot (1914)
- Marionette (1914)
- Nola (1915)
- Toots – Rag One Step (1915)
- An Operatic Nightmare – Desecration Rag No. 2 (1916)
- Clover Club – Fox Trot (1918)

== Songs ==
- As Long As the Band Will Play – 1911 (with Harold Atteridge)
- Snow Time – 1911 (with Bert Fitzgibbon)
- If That is Not Love Wot? - 1911 (with Louis Weslyn)
- When Sunday Rolls Around – 1911 (with Louis Weslyn)
- Night Time – 1911 (with Louis Weslyn)
- When You Know Why – 1913 (with Louis Weslyn)
- Evr'y Rose Reminds Me of You – 1913 (with Louis Weslyn)
- In the Shade of the Mango Tree – 1918 (with Louis Weslyn)
- My Gal's Another Gal Like Galli-Curci – 1918 (with Louis Weslyn)
- Nola (song) – 1922 (with James F. Burns) (posthumous)
