= Lieb =

Lieb is a surname. Notable people with the surname include:

- Eli Lieb (born 1979), American singer songwriter
- Elliott H. Lieb (born 1932), American mathematical physicist
- R. Eric Lieb, American writer and book editor
- Ernst Lieb, American business executive
- Fred Lieb (1888–1980), American sportswriter and baseball historian
- Marc Lieb (born 1980), German motor-racing driver
- Oliver Lieb (born 1969), German electronic music producer and DJ
- Thorsten Lieb (born 1973), German politician

== Other uses ==
- Lieb is a character from The Lingo Show, a kids' TV show

== See also ==
- Mihály Munkácsy (1844–1900), Hungarian painter, born Michael von Lieb
- Liebe, a surname
- Leeb, a surname
