= Leeb =

Leeb is a surname. It may refer to:

== People ==
- Anton Joseph Leeb (1769–1837), a mayor of Vienna
- Bill Leeb (born 1966), Austrian-Canadian electronic musician and record producer
- Brad Leeb (born 1979), Canadian ice hockey player
- Carlos Leeb (born 1968), Argentine football player and manager
- Emil Leeb (1881–1969), German general during World War II
- Greg Leeb (born 1977), Canadian ice hockey player
- Stephen Leeb (born 1946), American economist and author
- Thomas Leeb (born 1977), Austrian fingerstyle guitarist
- Tom Leeb (born 1989), French actor, singer and comedian
- Wilhelm Ritter von Leeb (1876–1956), German field marshal in World War II

== See also ==
- Leeb rebound hardness test
- Lieb (disambiguation)
- Liebe, a surname
