= Isidor Seiss =

German musician

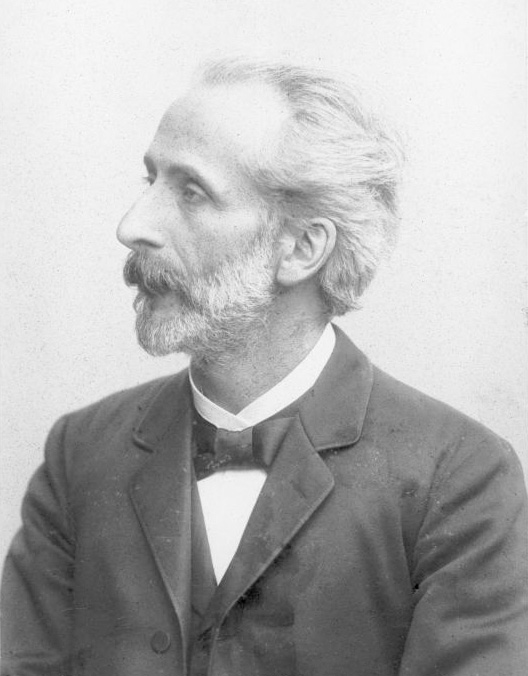
Isidor Seiss

Isidor Wilhelm Seiss (23 December 1840 – 25 September 1905) was a German composer, conductor, pianist, piano pedagogue and philanthropist. His surname also appears as Seiß, and his first name also appears as Isidore.

== Biography ==
Isidor Wilhelm Seiss was born in Dresden in 1840. His first musical studies were under Friedrich Wieck (piano) and Julius Otto (theory), before going to Moritz Hauptmann in Leipzig from 1858 to 1860. He did some performing in Germany and Belgium, then became a piano teacher at the Cologne Conservatory in 1871, where he had a long career. He conducted the Cologne Musical Society.

His notable students included Engelbert Humperdinck, Elly Ney (for nine years before she moved on to Leschetizky and Sauer), Willem Mengelberg, Carl Lachmund, Frederick Corder, Volkmar Andreae, Maurits Leefson, Henri Weil, Karl Krill and others. See: List of music students by teacher: R to S#Isidor Seiss.

Dedications to Isidor Seiss included:

- Edvard Grieg: Book III (Op. 43) of the Lyric Pieces
- Josef Rheinberger: Toccata in C minor, Op. 115
- August Winding: Preludes in All the Keys, Op. 26.

He wrote some educational pieces for piano and other minor works. He also arranged some of Beethoven's Contredanses and German Dances for piano. He also revised Weber's Piano Concerto No. 2 in E-flat, and published editions of Mendelssohn's Capriccio brillante in B minor, and other works.

Isidor Seiss died by his own hand in Cologne in 1905, having suffered increasing blindness that had forced him to retire from his teaching position. Although aged only 64, he had outlived his entire family, and in his will he endowed the Conservatory with a pension and cash grants for the four oldest teachers. He also bequeathed over half a million marks to the city of Cologne.
