= Friedrich Gernsheim =

German composer, conductor, pianist and teacher (1839–1916)

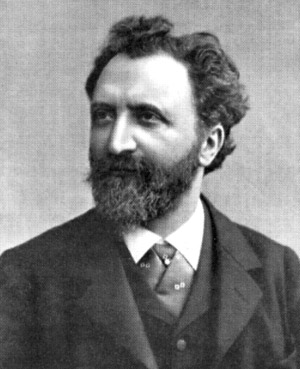
Friedrich Gernsheim

Friedrich Gernsheim (July 17, 1839 – September 11, 1916) was a German composer, conductor, and pianist.

== Early life ==
Gernsheim was born in Worms to a prominent Jewish physician. He was given his first musical training at home by his mother, and then from age seven Gernsheim studied under Worms' musical director, Louis Liebe, a former pupil of Louis Spohr's.

Gernsheim's doctor father moved the family to Frankfurt am Main in the aftermath of the 1848's year of revolutions. In Frankfurt, Gernsheim studied with Jakob Rosenhain's brother, Edward Rosenhain. Gernsheim made his first public appearance as a concert pianist in 1850 and toured for two seasons. His family then settled in Leipzig, where he studied piano with Ignaz Moscheles from 1852. He spent 1855 to 1860 in Paris, meeting Gioachino Rossini, Théodore Gouvy, Édouard Lalo, and Camille Saint-Saëns.

== Career ==
His travels afterwards took him to Saarbrücken, where in 1861 he took the conductor post vacated by Hermann Levi, then to Cologne, where in 1865 Ferdinand Hiller appointed him to the staff of the Conservatory where pupils included Engelbert Humperdinck and Carl Lachmund. He then served as musical director of the Philharmonic Society of Rotterdam from 1874 until 1890. In the later years, he became a teacher at the Stern Conservatory in Berlin, and in 1897 moved there to teach at the Prussian Academy of Arts, where he was elected to the senate in 1897. In 1877, he married Helene Hernsheim from Karlsruhe.

Gernsheim was a prolific composer, especially of orchestral, chamber, and instrumental music as well as songs. Some of his works implied Jewish subject matter, but Gernsheim rarely made explicit references in his music to Jewish heritage. His third symphony, for example, was based on the legend of the Song of Miriam, but directly inspired by a performance of Handel’s Israel in Egypt. His earlier works show the influence of Robert Schumann, and from 1868, when he first became friendly with Johannes Brahms, his compositions demonstrate a Brahmsian influence.

Gernsheim's four symphonies, the first of which was written before the publication of Brahms' First Symphony, are an interesting example of the application of Brahms' style by a contemporary. Gernsheim's last works, most notably his Zu einem Drama (1902), show him moving away from that reliance on influence and into a more personal style. He died in Berlin.

Because he was Jewish, Gernsheim's work was banned in Nazi Germany, and his papers and a biography written about him by Karl Holl were removed from music libraries.

== Style ==
Those who have studied Friedrich Gernsheim’s music categorize him as a Romantic composer heavily influenced by Johannes Brahms. However, while he did learn from his contemporary, Gernsheim began his career before hearing Brahms' work and this influence was only discovered later. Christopher Fifield suggests that Gernsheim owes his “instrumentation, thematic shapes, accompaniments, and orchestral textures” to both Brahms and Max Bruch. Some believe Gernsheim’s symphonic work to resemble Bruch's more than Brahms', but homages to both are present in his music. Unlike Bruch, who was largely inspired by folk songs, Gernsheim is described as having his own “personal melodic language” and is considered more daring in his harmonies.

Gernsheim’s first symphony premiered before Brahms’, and his themes were praised for possessing an “abundance of beautiful details,” many of which pass by the listener unnoticed in the first hearing, as Fifield describes. Fifield also claims that his treatment of instrumentation “reveals a very talented hand,” and many listeners of the time preferred Gernsheim’s symphonies to those by Brahms. Bruch considered Gernsheim’s first symphony a work that “ranks without question among the best that has been written in this genre in our time.” He even called Brahms’s symphonies overrated and agreed with critics in that Gernsheim demonstrated a great advantage over those of his contemporaries: “its excellent orchestration.”

Some of Gernsheim’s critics—including his teacher, Ignaz Moscheles—said he fell into the same trap Anton Bruckner did by composing short melodies or themes that were too complicated to develop further. However, Moscheles was quoted, after playing Gernsheim’s first piano quartet, that he did compose “with great agility in the manner of Schumann” and in the Romantic style of the time, but thought his clear motives were often sacrificed to “artificial counterpoint.” Many theorists and music critics today agree with this evaluation, saying his symphonies and other works tend to be discursive, while praising his talent in orchestration and achievements in chamber music.

In chamber settings, he wrote particularly well for strings and presented his most focused ideas and logical developments. His late orchestral works, such as his fourth symphony and the tone poem Zu einem Drama, demonstrate the maturity reached in his chamber music on a larger scale.

Throughout his career, Gernsheim proved himself a somewhat conservative composer and a faithful student of classical form. He composed under the belief that every measure should be “essential and inevitable,” which is present in his later works. Some argue that his discursive ideas, with their small-scale developments, that brought him criticism were often used intentionally to add variety within traditional structures. His music that follows the sonata-allegro form, for example, usually include at least three expositional themes that establish structural patterns while also allowing him to undermine them.

Common threads and relationships can be traced through his many themes, however, and Gernsheim uses them to achieve a certain balance in his music. Alexander Ringer calls this virtue “Gediegenheit,” or “decency and solidarity,” a principle that served as a constant guide in Gernsheim’s musical and personal life.

== Selected works (excerpted from worklist) ==
Of Gernsheim's music, the symphonies, the cello concerto, the first cello sonata, the piano trios, two of the piano quartets, the two piano quintets, the violin sonatas, and the second string quartet have been recorded.

=== Orchestral works ===
==== Symphonies ====
- Kinder-Sinfonie for strings, piano and children's instruments (1851)
- Symphony in E♭ major (completed 1857, Paris. 291 pp. unpublished manuscript.)
- Symphony No. 1 in G minor, Op. 32, 1875
- Symphony No. 2 in E♭ major, Op. 46, 1882
- Symphony No. 3 in C minor ('Miriam' or 'Mirjam'), Op. 54, 1887
- Symphony No. 4 in B♭ major, Op. 62, 1895

==== Other orchestral pieces ====
- 2 Overtures for Orchestra (1849, 1854)
- Waldmeisters Brautfahrt, Overture, Op. 13 (pub. by 1873)
- Zu einem Drama, Op. 82

==== Concertante works ====
- Piano Concerto in C minor, Op. 16
- Fantasy Piece for violin with orchestra, Op. 33
- Violin Concerto No. 1 in D major, Op. 42
- Divertimento in E for flute and string orchestra (or chamber ensemble), Op. 53
- Cello Concerto in E minor, Op. 78 (fairly popular in the early 20th century, with many mentions in the Neue Zeitschrift, and played on SWR2 radio on January 31, 2005 by cellist Alexander Hülshoff, the Staatsphilharmonie Rheinland-Pfalz, directed by Ari Rasilainen. Recorded and released by the British label Hyperion in its 'Romantic Cello Concerto' series, played by the Rundfunk-Sinfonieorchester Berlin, conducted by Hannu Lintu, with Alban Gerhardt as soloist)
- Violin Concerto No. 2 in F, Op. 86
- In Memoriam: ein Klagegesang für Streichorchester und Orgel, Op. 91 (1915)

=== Chamber music ===
- Introduction and Allegro appassionato, Op. 38
- String trio in G major, 1900 (first edition Amadeus Verlag, 2013)
- String Quartet No. 1 in C minor, Op. 25 (cpo 777 387-2, Diogenes Quartett, 2019)
- String Quartet No. 2 in A minor, Op. 31, 1875 (recorded on Audite)
- String Quartet No. 3 in F major, Op. 51, 1886 (cpo 777 387-2, Diogenes Quartett, 2019)
- String Quartet No. 4 in E minor, Op. 66
- String Quartet No. 5 in A major, Op. 83 (republished recently by Walter Wollenweber-Verlag, pub. originally circa 1911)
- Piano Quartet No. 1 in E♭, Op. 6
- Piano Quartet No. 2 in C minor, Op. 20 (performed in 2003, Pub. ca. 1870.)
- Piano Quartet No. 3 in F major, Op. 47, 1883
- Piano Quintet No. 1 in D minor, Op. 35
- Piano Quintet No. 2 in B minor, Op. 63, pub. ca. 1897 (definitely by 1898 – see review)
- String Quintet No. 1 in D major, Op. 9
- String Quintet No. 2 in E♭ major, Op. 89 (premiered in February 1916 and mentioned in the Neue Zeitschrift that year. Two-cello quintet. Given its modern premiere in 2003 along with his string trio op. 74.)
- Violin Sonata No. 1 in C minor, Op. 4, pub. ca. 1864
- Violin Sonata No. 2 in C, Op. 50, pub. ca. 1885
- Violin Sonata No. 3 in F, Op. 64, pub. ca. 1898
- Violin Sonata No. 4 in G, Op. 85
- Early violin sonata (E minor, 1857)
- Piano Trio No. 1 in F, Op. 28
- Piano Trio No. 2 in B, Op. 37
- Two other piano trios, in manuscript (search at the Altenberg Trio site. the Trio in B major, Op. 37 is in their repertoire.)
- Cello Sonata No. 1 in D minor, Op. 12
- Cello Sonata No. 2 in E minor, Op. 79
- Cello Sonata No. 3 in E minor, Op. 87 (1914)

=== Choral works ===
- Wächterlied, for chorus and orchestra, Op. 7
- Salamis, for men's chorus and orchestra, Op. 10
- Nibelungen Wiederfahrt, Op. 73
- Nornen Wiegenlied, Op. 65
- Agrippina, Op. 77

=== Piano pieces ===
- Piano Sonata in F minor, Op. 1 (published 1860)
- Piano Sonatas in D minor, D minor and E♭ (1854, 1858, 1859)

=== Organ pieces ===
- Fantasy and Fugue for Organ, Op. 76
