= Carl Lachmund =

American musician, conductor, and diarist

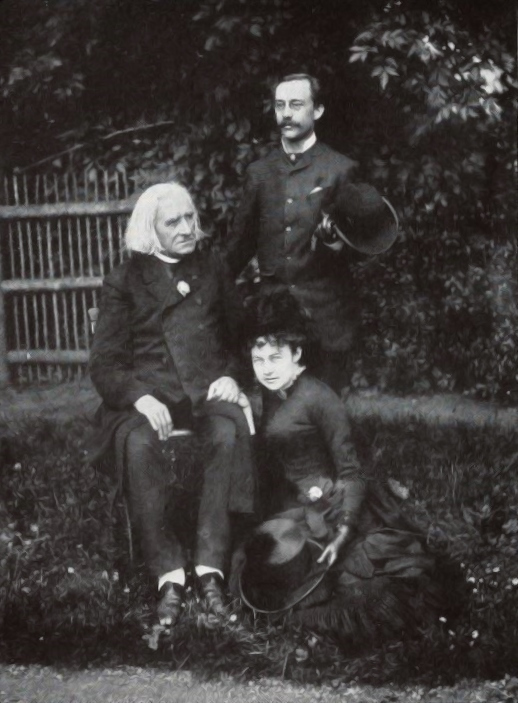
Franz Liszt with Carl and Caroline Lachmund

Carl V. Lachmund (27 March 1853 – 20 February 1928) was an American classical pianist, teacher, conductor, composer, and diarist. He was a student of Franz Liszt for three years, and his detailed diaries of his time with Liszt provide an invaluable insight into that composer’s teaching methods and some aspects of his character. He founded the Lachmund Conservatory in New York and ran it for 22 years, and he founded the Women's String Orchestra, conducting it for 12 seasons.

== Biography ==
Carl Valentine Lachmund was born in Boonville, Missouri in 1853, but spent most of his early life in Iowa. His parents Gustav Otto Lachmund and Sophia née Schmidt were immigrants from Germany.

His musical talent was recognised early. He went to Europe at the age of 16 and studied for six years, graduating in 1875 from the Cologne Conservatory, where his teachers were Ferdinand Hiller, Adolf Jensen, Friedrich Gernsheim and Isidor Seiss. He continued his studies in Berlin with Moritz Moszkowski, Friedrich Kiel (Paderewski was a fellow student), and Xaver and Philipp Scharwenka.

In 1877 he founded the German Conservatory of Music in Clinton, Iowa. He accompanied the violinist August Wilhelmj on his 1880 European tour.

In 1882 Lachmund went to Weimar to study under Franz Liszt, with whom he remained until 1884. His wife Carrie studied the harp in Weimar during this time. Lachmund kept a diary that eventually ran to some 750 pages, and it gives one of the most exhaustive accounts of Liszt's keyboard instruction. It is the single most valuable English-language source of information on Liszt's pedagogical style. After World War I, Lachmund decided to turn his diary into a book. He approached more than 200 people who had been in contact with Liszt to share their memories, to obtain more background information. Many did so, but the book was not published in Lachmund's lifetime. On his death, all of these and other papers were deposited in the New York Public Library. The Liszt scholar Alan Walker has edited, annotated and drawn extensively on the Lachmund papers in his research for his 3-volume biography of Liszt.

Carl Lachmund seems to have been held in special favour by Liszt. He was the only American student to ever have a testimonial letter from the composer. He was also given Liszt's diary for 1876, and the manuscript of the 2nd Mephisto Waltz. In addition, he retained various of Liszt's personal items, such as a box of strands of his shoulder-length hair, five of his cigar stubs, a cognac glass, two pencils Liszt used for correcting and annotating manuscripts, and a linen handkerchief embossed with his initials. Liszt had a habit of writing out two copies of his letters longhand, signing both copies, mailing one and keeping the other. Lachmund owned a number of these letters. There was also a sliver of wood from Schiller's deathbed and some leaves from Goethe's grave.

Lachmund was present at the premiere of Parsifal by Liszt's son-in-law Richard Wagner in 1882, and was invited by Wagner's wife Cosima to attend a reception in her husband's honour.

After leaving Liszt, Lachmund taught at the Klindworth-Scharwenka Conservatory, then toured in Germany and the United States on his return. He was based in Minneapolis between 1885 and 1891. He accompanied the contralto Marianne Brandt on her 1887 American tour. He then settled in New York City, where he set up the Lachmund Conservatory, of which he was the director for 22 years. By 1912 it had become largely devoted to the training of voices for opera.

In 1896 he founded the Women's String Orchestra, and conducted it for twelve seasons. Their concerts included one at the request of President William McKinley for the survivors of the battleship USS Maine, whose sinking in Havana Harbour in 1898 was instrumental in the fomenting of the Spanish–American War.

He was an Instructor of Piano and Theory and Acting Director at the University of Oregon in Eugene from 1912 to 1913. He had moved there because of bronchial problems. He set up his own private teaching practice in Portland in 1914 but continued teaching at the university for a further year. He returned to New York later in 1914 and had a studio in Steinway Hall.

He died in 1928 in Yonkers, New York, aged 74.

== Students ==
Carl Lachmund's students included:

- Felix Arndt
- J. Bodewalt Lampe
- Charles Gilbert Spross (1874–1961), and
- Homer Czar Nearing.

== Compositions ==
- Italian Suite (orchestra)
- Japanese Overture (conducted by Theodore Thomas in 1887, and by Anton Seidl in New York, and by the Boston Philharmonic Orchestra)
- several other overtures
- Trio for Harp, Violin and Cello (played in the Berlin Philharmonic Concert in 1884)
- Valse Impromptu, Op. 12
- Woodland Lullaby
- Concert Étude (ed. Adolf von Henselt)
- Concert Prelude (this was highly praised by Liszt, and was played by Martha Remmert in her German tour).

== Personal life ==
Carl Lachmund's first wife was Caroline (Carrie) Josephine Culbertson (23 April 1854 – 28 March 1889), a harpist. They married on 8 May 1877. Their children were Helen Reed (August 1878 – 2 February 1922), Franz Culbertson (26 July 1885 – ??), and Otto C.

A year after Carrie's death, in 1890 Lachmund married Mathilde Filbert, with whom he had three more children: Arnaud Filbert, Marjorie (sometimes seen as Marjoire) Gleyre, and Thalia.

Arnaud (later known as Arno) Lachmund was employed by the Duo-Art Piano Roll company and worked with Felix Arndt, a student of his father's. He later worked for Ampico, and may have changed his name again to Arnold Lackman. Despite Arno's involvement in the recording industry, Carl Lachmund did not make any discs or piano rolls.

== Posthumous award ==
On 9 May 2012, Carl Lachmund was awarded a posthumous Liszt Medal, the highest award presented by the American Liszt Society. The award was presented at the 2012 Festival of the American Liszt Society on 19 May.

== Writings ==
- Retrospections of Three Years' Study with Liszt
- Living With Liszt: From The Diary Of Carl Lachmund, An American Pupil of Liszt, 1882–1884, ed. Alan Walker
