= Ludwig Bischoff =

German publisher

Ludwig Bischoff (27 November 1794 – 24 February 1867) was a German educator, musician, critic and publisher.

== Life ==
He was born in Dessau as the son of a cellist from a family of musicians with a long tradition. Thus, he received his first musical education from his father.

From 1812, Bischoff studied philology in Berlin. But already in 1813 he joined the Prussian Cavalry Regiment and took part in the Battle of Leipzig. In 1814, he resumed his studies in Berlin and finished them in 1817.

In spring 1818, he moved to Switzerland, where he found employment as a pedagogue. After his return, he became a teacher at a grammar school in Berlin in 1821 and in 1823 director of the grammar school in Wesel, where Konrad Duden took his Abitur with him.

Bischoff actively participated in the musical life in Wesel and founded a singing and orchestra association. Because of his liberal attitude and his behaviour during the 1848 revolution he had to say goodbye and moved to Bonn in 1849. There, he founded the Rheinische Musikzeitung (1850-59, later Niederrheinische Musikzeitung), which was published in Cologne and whose declared aim was to defend the traditions of classical art against the unreasonable demands of contemporaries. In 1850 he founded the music society "Beethoven Verein" together with others. Only a short time later, this association, consisting of professional musicians and dilettantes, gave subscription concerts.

Bischoff spent the last years in Cologne, where he died of a stroke in 1867 at the age of 72.

Bischoff was one of the main fighters against the "neudeutsche" Wagner direction and was wrongly accused by him (in his writing Judaism in Music) of having coined the term "Zukunftsmusik".
