= Ernst Lieb =

American business executive (born 1955)

Ernst H. Lieb
- Born: June 22, 1955 (age 70); Stuttgart, Germany
- Spouse: Petra Lieb
- Children: Katja Lieb, Daniel Lieb, and Christopher Lieb

Ernst Lieb is an American business executive who has assumed the roles of president and CEO of Mercedes-Benz USA on September 1, 2006, replacing Paul Halata. He returned to Australia and became a part owner of a company called Motorworld, which owns Jeep-Chrysler dealerships. He had previously been president and CEO of DaimlerChrysler's Australia & Pacific division. Prior to his role in Australia, he had been president and CEO of Mercedes-Benz Canada since July 1, 1995. He has a long history with Mercedes-Benz, starting in 1975 as a spare-parts specialist.

Mercedes-Benz placed third in the 2010 J.D. Power and Associates Sales Satisfaction Index (SSI) study and surpassed Lexus.

Lieb has been a resident of Mahwah, New Jersey.
