= Franz Brendel =

German music critic

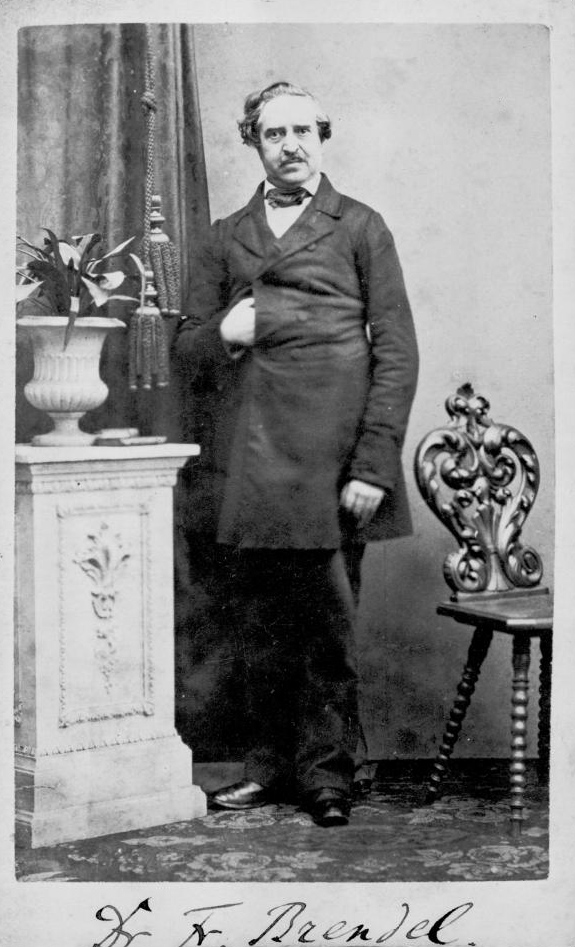
Franz Brendel profile.

Karl Franz Brendel (26 November 1811 – 25 November 1868) was a German music critic, journalist and musicologist born in Stolberg, the son of a successful mining engineer named Christian Friedrich Brendel.

== Biography ==
He was a student at the University of Leipzig, University of Berlin, and University of Freiburg up until the year 1840. In 1846, he began teaching music history at the Leipzig Conservatory, and in 1852, he published a well-regarded general history of European music. Brendel also published a book on Franz Liszt.

He was the editor of the Neue Zeitschrift für Musik, taking over in 1845 the position relinquished by Robert Schumann (in 1844) and remaining in post until he died in 1868. Brendel coined the phrase Neudeutsche Schule (New German School) to describe the progressive musical movement in Germany headed by Richard Wagner and Franz Liszt in the middle of the nineteenth century. He died in Leipzig.

== Literature ==
- Johannes Besser: Musikgeschichtler, Musikästhetiker und Musikpolitiker Carl Franz Brendel in: Sächsische Heimatblätter Issue 1/1971, pp. 415–419
- Golan Gur: Music and ‘Weltanschauung’: Franz Brendel and the Claims of Universal History in: Music & Letters Issue 93(3)/2012, pp. 350–373
- Wendelin Weißheimer: Erlebnisse mit Richard Wagner, Franz Liszt und vielen anderen Zeitgenossen, Stuttgart/Leipzig 1898
- Don Randel: The Harvard Biographical Dictionary of Music. Harvard 1996, p. 106.

== See also ==
- Allgemeiner Deutscher Musikverein
- War of the Romantics
