= Louis Liebe =

German conductor and composer

Friedrich Eduard Ludwig (Louis) Liebe (26 November 1819 – 4 July 1900) was a German composer and musical teacher. By 1863, he had published more than 50 works as a composer, including pieces for piano, violin, voice, and male choirs, many of which appeared in France and England. His most popular works included Harmony (words by Adaien Linden of Metz) and a cantata for mixed choir with orchestral accompaniment (words by Emile Drescher). He won a prize in Mannheim for Muttersprache for male choirs, as well as prizes in Paris for several a capella pieces and a fugue for organ, among other compositions.

== Early life and education ==
Liebe was born in Magdeburg, where his father worked for the higher regional court. He studied music in Kassel and was a pupil of Louis Spohr.

== Career ==
From 1842 to 1844, Liebe taught at the Sallmann'schen Schule in Kassel. In 1844, he lived in Koblenz briefly and moved to Mainz later that year.

From 1845 or 1846 to 1850, Liebe was the musical director at Worms. While at Worms, one of his pupils was Friedrich Gernsheim, who went on to become a composer and musical director at Saarbrücken.

From 1850 to 1867, Liebe lived in Strasbourg. He was director of the Association of Choral Societies of Alsace and was a music teacher. During this period, he toured Paris, Zürich, Chur, and London.

From 1883 to 1886, Liebe was based in Kostanz, where he conducted the Bodan singing society.

== Personal life and death ==
Liebe married in Mainz in October 1847. He died in 1900 in Chur.
