= Alan Walker (musicologist) =

English-Canadian musicologist (born 1930)

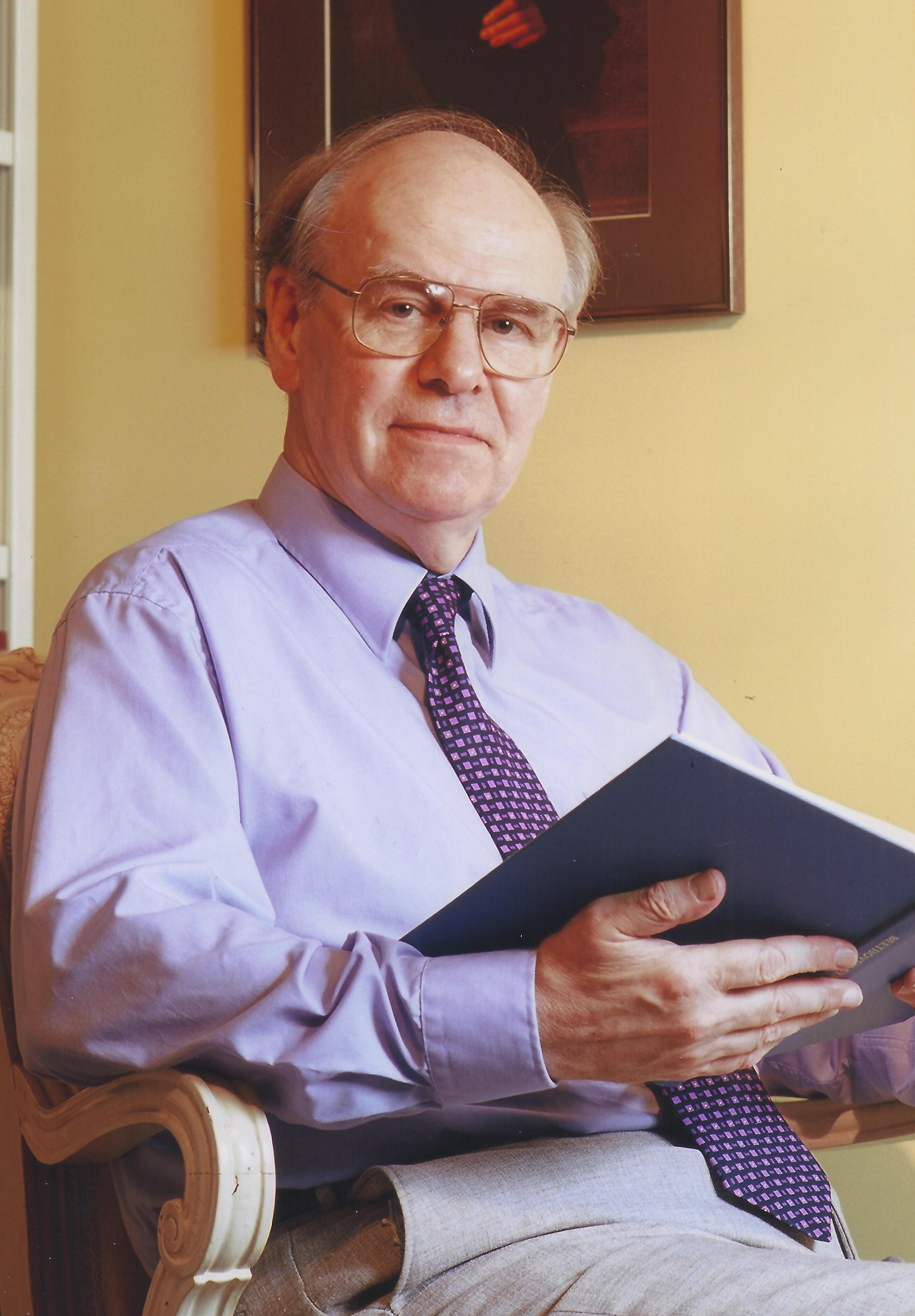
- Born: 6 April 1930 (age 96); Scunthorpe, England
- Education: University of Durham
- Occupation: Musicologist

Alan Walker FRSC (born 6 April 1930) is an English-Canadian musicologist and university professor best known as a biographer and scholar of composer Franz Liszt. Walker has also written on composers Robert Schumann and Frédéric Chopin, as well as conductor Hans von Bülow. He has held posts at a variety of institutions, including the Guildhall School of Music, the University of London, McMaster University, and City, University of London.

== Biography ==
Walker was born in Scunthorpe, Lincolnshire, on 6 April 1930. He received an LGSM diploma in 1949, ARCM in 1950, a Bachelor of Music from University of Durham in 1956, and a Doctor of Music in 1965. Between 1957 and 1960 he studied privately with Hans Keller, an association which he has always acknowledged as formative. These lessons were resumed, albeit irregularly, once Walker joined Keller at the BBC in 1961.

From 1958 to 1961 Walker lectured at the Guildhall School of Music, having studied piano there with Alfred Nieman, noted for teaching improvisational techniques. He also taught at the University of London from 1954 to 1960. Walker worked at the BBC Radio Music Division as a producer between 1961 and 1971. Seeking to return to his "first love", teaching, he gave up radio production and took an appointment as Professor of Music at McMaster University in Hamilton, Ontario, where he chaired the department of music from 1971 to 1980, and from 1989 to 1995. In 1981, he was responsible for the establishment at McMaster of the first graduate program in music criticism in Canada. Since 1995, he has been professor emeritus at McMaster. From 1984 to 1987, he was a distinguished visiting professor of music at City University in London.

Walker lives in Ancaster, Ontario.

== Franz Liszt ==
His three-volume biography of Franz Liszt, which took him 25 years to complete, has been very influential. Common adjectives attached to the work include "monumental" and "magisterial", and it is said to have "unearthed much new material and provided a strong stimulus for further research". Walker himself says that when he found, as a BBC producer compiling notes for program announcers, that "there wasn't a decent book in English on Liszt", he eventually decided to write one himself, but was determined "not to make a major statement that couldn't be supported by documents ... and because Liszt himself was a traveller the archives were everywhere."

The first volume won the James Tait Black Memorial Prize in biography for 1983 and best book on music from the Yorkshire Post Newspapers in 1984. The three-book series was given the Royal Philharmonic Society Book Award in 1998.

Time magazine praised the biography as "a textured portrait of Liszt and his times without rival", saying that Walker's work was "equally strong on the music and the life", and discussed Liszt's corpus "with greater understanding and clarity than any previous biographer". The New York Times, reviewing the second volume, said of Walker's passion for his subject, "Mr. Walker can see only the good, and will stand for no criticism of his hero", but still called Walker's extensive research "incredible.... Mr. Walker seems to know everything about Liszt, and anything connected with Liszt, during every single day of the long life of that genius." The Washington Post music critic Tim Page, including the third volume in his best books of the year list, called it "unquestionably a landmark" and "meticulously detailed, passionately argued and sometimes wrenchingly moving".

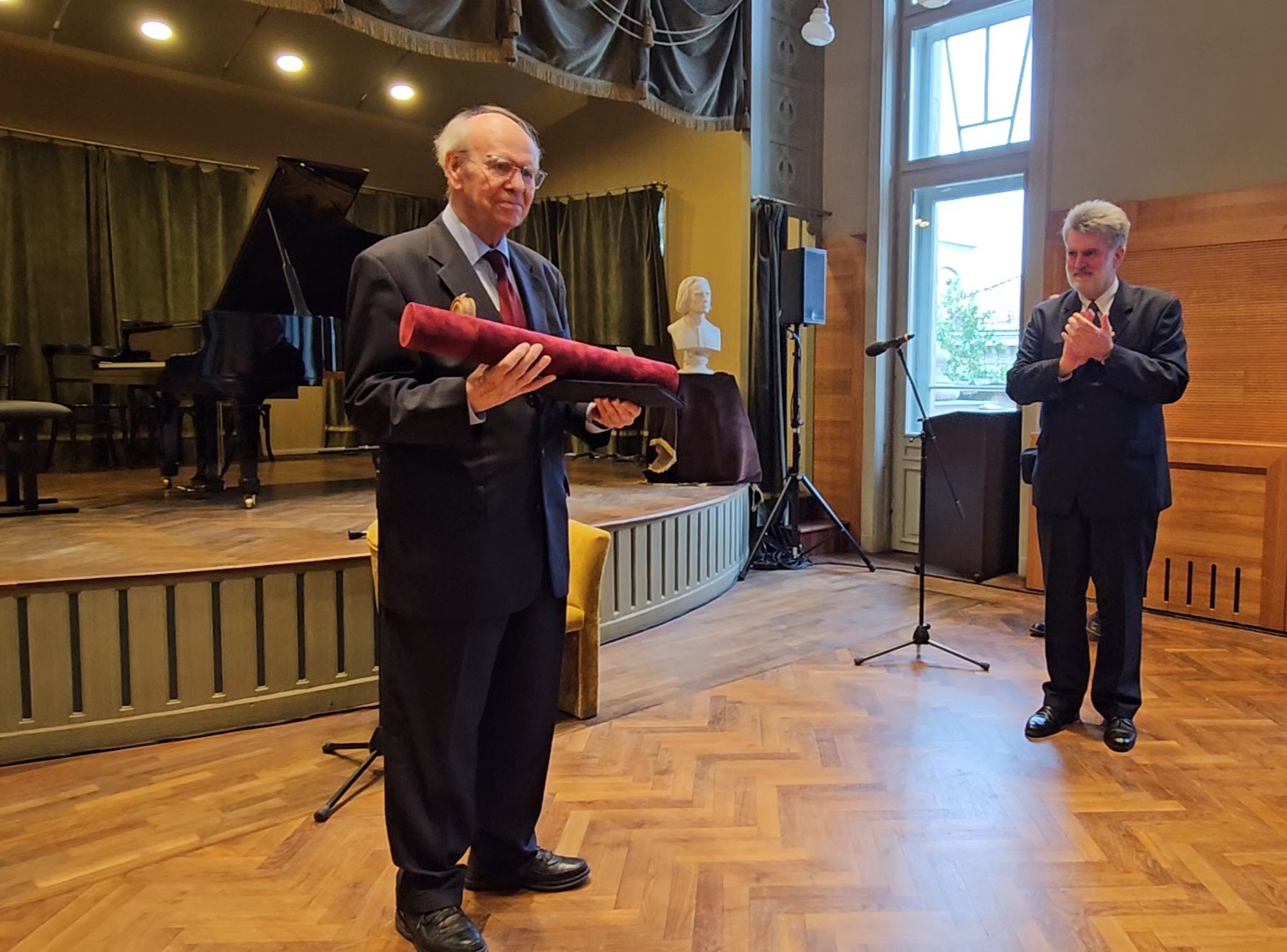
Walker receiving an honorary doctorate from the Franz Liszt Academy of Music, Budapest, presented by the Rector Dr. Csaba Kutnyánszky.

The technique of biography, and how it differs from other literary genres, has always been of interest to Walker and he has written about it. When asked about the genesis of his Liszt biography he wrote: "I had always been immensely attracted to Liszt's magnetic personality, and in my childhood I was drawn to the legend of his piano playing as to few other topics. They say that in every biography is an autobiography trying to get out. The idea would be diverting if it were not so sobering. I have come to believe that the best biographies choose their biographers, not vice versa. The lucky biographers write their work not because they have a choice but because they have no choice at all."

In recognition of the influence that the biography has had on subsequent research into the composer's life and work, the Franz Liszt Academy of Music conferred on Walker the degree of Doctor of Music (honoris causa) in a ceremony held in Budapest on May 7, 2025. In his acceptance speech, Walker said that he was "totally surprised and immensely privileged to receive this distinction". He remarked that it was one he particularly valued because it came from the institution founded by Liszt himself.

== Other work ==
In two earlier books — A Study in Musical Analysis (1962) and An Anatomy of Musical Criticism (1966) — Walker had attempted to define a theory of musical criticism, influenced by Freud. Eric Sams summarised his argument:

Music is 'autonomous' and its principles are 'unconscious'....conceived, received, and perceived unconsciously by composer, listener and critic. But they are part of a musical communication, so only the critic who 'gets the message' can be right; his sole conscious function is then to explain how the creative principles work.

Walker has also written substantially about Robert Schumann and Frédéric Chopin, and continues to lecture in Canada, the US, and UK on all three musicians. In October 2018 he brought to completion a large-scale biography of Fryderyk Chopin, a book on which he worked for ten years. It has been described as "a biographical masterpiece", and was named Classical Music Book of the Year by the Sunday Times of London. James Penrose in The New Criterion wrote: “With Liszt, and now Fryderyk Chopin so well cared for, one can but hope that Walker will try for the hat trick.” On the other hand, he was also criticised for downplaying or idiosyncratically interpreting private aspects of Chopin's life, such as the erotic letters to men.

== Honours ==
- Honorary Fellow of the Guildhall School of Music, 1974.
- Hungarian Liszt Society Medal, 1980
- The James Tait Black Memorial Prize for Biography, 1983.
- American Liszt Society Medal, 1984
- Fellow of the Royal Society of Canada, 1986
- Pro Cultura Hungaria Medal (Government of Hungary), 1995
- Honorary D.Litt. (honoris causa) from McMaster University, 2002
- Lifetime Achievement Award from the Music Teachers National Association (MTNA), 2010
- Knight's Cross of the Order of Merit of the Republic of Hungary, 2012
- Honorary Mus. Doc. (honoris causa) from the Franz Liszt Academy of Music, Hungary, 2025

== Books ==
- A Study in Musical Analysis, 1962.
- An Anatomy of Musical Criticism, 1966.
- Symposium on Chopin (editor), 1967.
- Symposium on Liszt (editor), 1970.
- Franz Liszt: The Man and His Music. New York: Taplinger Publishing, 1970. ISBN 0-8008-2990-5.
- Robert Schumann: The Man and His Music, 1972. ISBN 0-214-66805-3.
- Symposium on Schumann (editor), 1972.
- Franz Liszt: v. 1. The Virtuoso Years, 1811–1847. Hardcover publisher Knopf, 1983, Softcover publisher Ithaca: Cornell University Press and revised, 1987. ISBN 0-394-52540-X for all three hardcover. ISBN 0-8014-9421-4 for v. 1 revised.
- Franz Liszt: v. 2. The Weimar Years, 1848–1861. Knopf and Cornell University Press (no new material), 1989. Revised ISBN 0-8014-9721-3.
- Liszt, Carolyne, and the Vatican: The Story of a Thwarted Marriage, as it emerges from the original Church documents edited and translated by Gabriele Erasmi, 1991.
- The Diary of Carl Lachmund: An American Pupil of Liszt (editor), 1995.
- Franz Liszt: v. 3. The Final Years, 1861–1886. Knopf and Cornell University Press, 1996 and 1997. Cornell edition has ISBN 0-8014-8453-7.
- The Death of Franz Liszt: Based on the Unpublished Diary of his Pupil Lina Schmalhausen (editor). Cornell University Press, 2002. ISBN 0-8014-4076-9.
- Reflections on Liszt, 2005.
- Hans von Bülow: a Life and Times, OUP, 2009.
- Fryderyk Chopin: A Life and Times, 2018

== Articles ==
Walker has written over 100 articles for scholarly music journals, and provided the biographical entry on Liszt for Grove's Dictionary of Music and Musicians (2001). Journal articles include:

- 'Schoenberg's Classical Background', Music Review, xix (1958), 283–9.
- 'Aesthetics versus Acoustics', The Score, No.27, July 1960.
- 'Back to Schönberg', Music Review, xxi (1960), 140–47.
- 'Liszt and the Beethoven Symphonies', Music Review, xxxi (1970), 302–14.
- 'Liszt's Duo Sonata', Musical Times, cxvi (1975), 620–21.
- 'Schumann, Liszt, and the C major Fantasie, op. 17', Music and Letters, vol. 60, 1979.
- 'Music and the Unconscious', British Medical Journal, 22 December 1979.
- 'Personal View [Infant prodigies]', British Medical Journal, 13 September 1980.
- 'Liszt and Vienna', New Hungarian Quarterly, No.99 (1985), 253–9; repr. in Journal of the American Liszt Society, No.xix (1986), 10–20.
- 'A Boy Named Daniel', Hungarian Quarterly, vol. 27, Autumn 1986.
- 'Liszt and Agnes Street-Klindworth: A Spy in the Court of Weimar?', Studia Musicologica Academiae Scientiarum Hungarica, vol. 28, 1986.
- 'Schopenhauer and Music', The Piano Quarterly, vol. 144, Winter 1988–89.
- 'Liszt and the Schubert Song Transcriptions', Musical Quarterly, lxvii (1981), 50–63; lxxv (1991), 248–62.
- 'Joukowsky's Portraits of Liszt', Hungarian Quarterly, vol. 34, Summer 1993.
- 'Liszt and his Pupils', Hungarian Quarterly, vol. 36, Summer 1995.
- 'Tribute to Hans Keller', Canadian University Music Review, xvii (1996), 118–28.
- 'Liszt and the Lied'", Hungarian Quarterly, vol. 37, Winter 1996.
- "Ernst von Dohnányi (1877–1960): A Tribute", Hungarian Quarterly, vol. 43, Spring 2002.
- "Dohnányi Redeemed", Hungarian Quarterly, vol. 43, Autumn 2002.

== See also ==
- Music criticism
