= Allgemeiner Deutscher Musikverein =

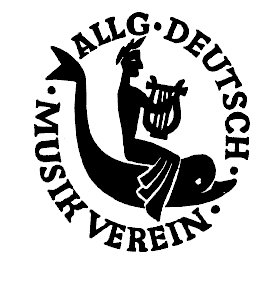

The Allgemeiner Deutscher Musikverein (ADMV, "General German Music Association") was a German musical association founded in 1861 by Franz Liszt and Franz Brendel, to embody the musical ideals of the New German School of music.

== Background ==
At the Tonkünstler-Versammlung (Musicians Assembly) of 1859 in Leipzig, the organisers, Liszt and Brendel, wanted to open the path for the foundation of a "Allgemeiner Deutscher Musikverein" (General German Music Association), to embody what they thought of as the core principles of the New German School (q.v.) of music. The proposal was introduced by Louis Köhler on the afternoon of 3 June 1861. It was supported in speeches by prominent persons, among them Liszt, and then accepted. On 7 August 1861, at the next Tonkünstler-Versammlung, for this time in Weimar, the foundation of the ADMV took place. The association started with 202 members, 37 of them from abroad.

== The ADMV ==
Liszt left Weimar on 18 August, travelling to Silesia, where, from 22 August until 19 September, in Löwenberg he was guest of the Prince of Hohenzollern-Hechingen. In a letter to Brendel of 16 September 1861, he wrote:

His Highness adheres always firmly and faithfully to the endeavors of the "New German School," and is desirous of supporting it still further. On this account I think it would be desirable to elect Seifriz as a member of the Committee of the Allgemeiner Deutscher Musikverein. I also vote especially for Stein (of Sondershausen), Eduard Liszt, Herbeck, Ambros, David – without a word against the rest of the names which you have proposed.

The letter shows that, according to Liszt's wishes, the endeavors of the "New German School" and those of the ADMV were to be very close, not to say identical. For the purpose of reaching this aim, the steering committee of the ADMV should consist solely of persons with his confidence.

The main initiatives which led to the foundation of the ADMV had nearly all been Liszt's. In 1835 he had published in the Parisian Gazette musicale an article series De la situation des artistes ("On the situation of artists"). In his first articles, he had taken a critical look at contemporary Parisian musical life which he found wanting in all aspects. In his last article he had made suggestions for a reorganisation of musical life.

In October 1842 Liszt had been nominated in Weimar as "Kapellmeister in außerordentlichen Diensten" ("Conductor in extraordinary services"). At that time he was travelling virtuoso, touring with concerts through Europe. In the beginning of 1848 he had settled in Weimar. Since 1849 he had tried to install a "Goethe-Stiftung" ("Goethe Foundation") for the purpose of supporting the arts as suggested in his article series of 1835. During the 1850s it became clear that the project could not be realized. The foundation of the ADMV was Liszt's next attempt, and this attempt was a success.

In their version of 1861, the statutes of the ADMV were formulated by Liszt together with Brendel. They resembled those of the projected "Goethe-Stiftung". In the early 20th century, there were attempts to rename the ADMV as "Liszt Verein" or "Neudeutscher Musikverein" ("New German Music Association").

Until the end of his life, Liszt was the intellectual rector of the ADMV, but did not want to be its president. The first president was Franz Brendel, until his death in 1868. Brendel's successors were Carl Riedel, until 1888, Hans Bronsart von Schellendorff, until 1898, Fritz Steinbach, until 1901, Richard Strauss, until 1909, Max von Schillings, until 1919, Friedrich Rösch, until 1925, Siegmund von Hausegger until 1935, and Peter Raabe. In 1937, the ADMV was closed on order of the German National Socialist regime.

== Aims of the ADMV ==
=== Supporting aims ===
The ADMV aimed at both musical performance and practical support. Absence of funds delayed support initiatives. In the course of time the ADMV became trustee of several foundations. The earliest was a "Beethoven-Stiftung" (Beethoven Foundation), (1871) funded by the assets of Sophie and Robert Pflughaupt, and enlarged by gifts of Liszt and Karl Alexander, Grand Duke of Saxe-Weimar-Eisenach. Artists supported by the "Beethoven-Stiftung" included Robert Franz, August Göllerich, Felix Draeseke, Max Reger, Hans Pfitzner and others.

After Liszt's death on 31 July 1886, Marie Hohenlohe-Schillingsfürst, daughter of Princess Wittgenstein, founded in 1887 a "Franz Liszt Stiftung" (Franz Liszt Foundation). The funds were destined for editing a complete edition of Liszt's musical works, as well as for stipends. Amongst artists supported by the "Franz Liszt Stiftung" were Robert Franz and Claudio Arrau. In 1903 and 1904, when Richard Strauss was president of the ADMV, Arnold Schoenberg was supported with an annual sum of 1,000 Marks, the maximum grant of the foundation.

Further foundations were a "Mansouroff-Stiftung", founded 1889, a "Hermann-Stiftung", founded 1893, and a "Richard-Wagner-Stiftung", founded 1915 and dedicated to supporting performances of music dramatic works. In 1937, when the ADMV was closed, the foundations still existed, although there had been losses of considerable amounts due to World War I and subsequent economic crisis. Traces of the foundations can be found until 1943, but are lost thereafter.

=== Artistic aims ===
As part of the artistic aims of the ADMV, annual Tonkünstler-Versammlungen at different locations were to be arranged, with performances of important, rarely heard, and especially new musical works of all kinds. However, older works that were only seldom or not at all heard, but of interest because of their importance, were also to be performed. In addition, new works, either musical or scholarly ones, were to be printed. The ADMV was to have an own library, and to edit an annual almanac. Of the almanac, only volumes for the years 1868, 1869 and 1870 were realized. Until 1892, the main organ of the ADMV was the Neue Zeitschrift für Musik. Afterwards, until 1933, members of the ADMV received "Mitteilungen" (Communications).

The ADMV had a literary and a musical department; the former decided about lectures to be given at the Tonkünstler-Versammlungen, the latter selected musical works to be performed. Until his death in 1886, Liszt was the head of the musical department. Other prominent members over the years were Hans von Bülow, Carl Friedrich von Weitzmann, Louis Köhler, Carl Riedel, Bronsart von Schellendorff, Felix Draeseke, Eduard Lassen, Eugen d'Albert, Richard Strauss, Engelbert Humperdinck, Felix Weingartner, Max von Schillings, Siegmund von Hausegger, Hans Pfitzner, Alexander von Zemlinsky, Peter Raabe, Jean Louis Nicodé, Emil von Reznicek, Heinz Tiessen, Joseph Haas, Paul Hindemith, Alban Berg, Ernst Toch and others.

The musical department also decided at which places the Tonkünstler-Versammlungen should be arranged. After the Tonkünstler-Versammlung of 1861 in Weimar, there was a break of three years. In 1864 a Tonkünstler-Versammlung in Karlsruhe took place. After that, with exception of the years 1866, 1875 and 1915–18 (World War I), annual Tonkünstler-Versammlungen were arranged. In several cases, 1903, 1910 and 1932, places in Switzerland, Basel, Zürich, and once again Zürich, were chosen. The Tonkünstler-Versammlung of 1905 took place in Graz.

== Concert repertoire of the ADMV until 1886 ==
During Liszt's lifetime, he was himself by a long way the most frequently performed composer at the concerts of the Tonkünstler-Versammlungen. In 135 performances 96 of his works were played. The second place was held by J. S. Bach with 30 performances of 24 works. Many of his works were new discoveries after they had for the first time been published in the complete edition of the "Bach-Gesellschaft" (Bach-Society). After Liszt the most frequently performed contemporary composer was Brahms with 25 performances of 16 works. Of Berlioz, 14 works were performed in 23 performances, and of Wagner 12 works in 22 performances. In places 6 to 12 were Raff, Cornelius, Lassen, Schumann, Draeseke, Beethoven and Bülow.

The strong position of Brahms in the concert programs of the ADMV may at first sight be surprising, as he had been often characterized by reference to the "Manifesto" he wrote with Joachim against the New German School. But an artist's career can hardly be reduced to a single event. Even in 1864, in connection with the Tonkünstler-Versammlung in Karlsruhe, it was Liszt who suggested a performance of Joachim's Violin Concerto in Hungarian style. After a dispute with Bülow, who vehemently voted against, Liszt's suggestion was accepted. After 1869, Brendel having died the previous year, works by Brahms were regularly performed; and 1887, after Liszt's death, Brahms became himself a member of the ADMV. Shortly afterwards he was elected as member of the steering committee.

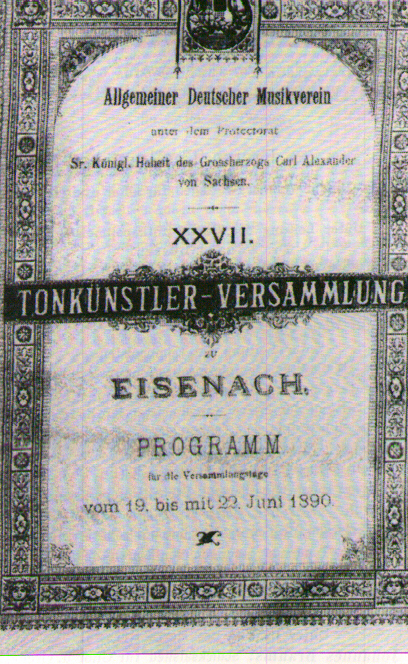
Tonkünstler-Versammlung 19–22 June 1890 in Eisenach

During 1861–1886, among the works on Liszt's suggestions were:

- Felix Draeseke – Germania-Marsch (1861) as well as songs and the Requiem in B minor (1883)
- Hans von Bülow – song cycle Die Entsagende op.8 (1861)
- Bronsart von Schellendorff – Piano Concerto, Op. 10
- Peter Cornelius – Terzet from the opera Der Barbier von Bagdad (1861)
- Leopold Damrosch – Serenade for violin and orchestra (1861)
- Eduard Lassen – Symphony in four movements (1867) and the music to Hebbel's Nibelungen-Trilogy (1872)
- Heinrich Herzogenberg – Deutsche Liederspiel (1879)
- Carl Müller-Hartung – Psalm 42 for solo, chorus and orchestra (1872), Psalm 84 for baritone, solo-quartet and threesome male chorus (1878), a Fest-Ouverture in C major (1884), and soprano songs (1886)
- Xaver Scharwenka – 2nd Piano Concerto (1881)
- Heinrich Schulze-Beuthen – Psalms 42 and 43 (1870),
- Carl Stöhr – Pastoral-Ouverture (1861),
- Camille Saint-Saëns – Die Hochzeit des Prometheus (1870) as well as a Cello Sonata (1874).

Frequently Liszt also suggested works by Russian composers such as César Cui, Alexander Borodin, Alexander Glazunov, Nikolai Rimsky-Korsakov and Pyotr Ilyich Tchaikovsky, all of them members of the ADMV. In 1876, 1880 and 1883, the Symphony in E♭ major of Borodin was played. However, not all of Liszt's suggestions regarding Russian composers found acceptance. For example, in 1885 it was Liszt's suggestion to perform the Symphony in C major by Mily Balakirev, dedicated to him himself. Instead, Balakirev's Overture King Lear and some of his piano pieces were played.

Due to the close connection between Liszt himself, the "New German School" and the ADMV, the above listed works can be taken as examples of music of the "New German School". Estimating their artistic value, or even getting knowledge of them, is however a difficult task. Nearly all of the works have disappeared from the regularly played concert repertoire, and the scores can only be accessed in archives. The music of the "New German School" up to 1886, including most of Liszt's works, was neglected or ignored even by scholarly research for a long period, with the exception of that of Wagner. Only relatively late in the 20th century did interest revive.

== The ADMV after Liszt's death ==
=== The ADMV up to World War I ===
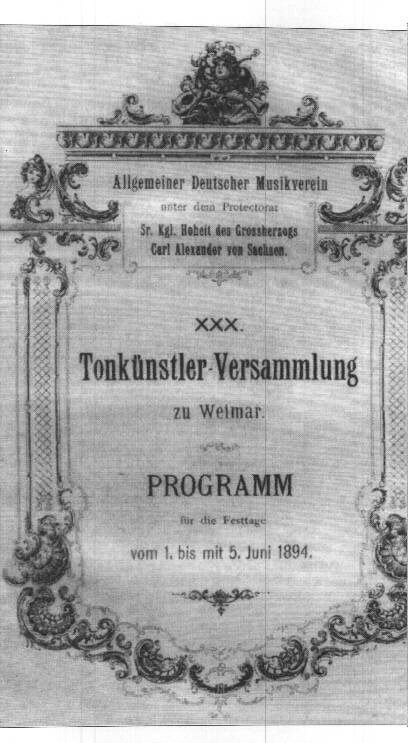
Tonkünstler-Versammlung 1–5 June 1894 in Weimar

The development of the ADMV after Liszt's death is linked with the career of Richard Strauss. He was a member from 1887. In the same year, at the Tonkünstler-Versammlung in Cologne, his Piano Quartet, Op. 13, for was performed. During 1890–98 Strauss was member of the "musikalische Sektion". As such he supported Gustav Mahler, whose Symphony no. 1 was performed in June 1894 at the Tonkünstler-Versammlung in Weimar.

In 1898 a new president was to be elected, since Bronsart von Schellendorff wanted to resign. Strauss, at that time regarded as avant-garde composer, and a successful one, was an ideal candidate. However, there were severe divergences between him and the rest of the leading committee concerning his activities in favour of a change of the legal rights of composers of instrumental music, regarding royalties from performances of their works. For these reasons, after Fritz Steinbach had been elected as new president, Strauss was on 24 September 1898 excluded from the steering committee. He founded own organisations, but 1901 returned to the ADMV. In a so-called "revolution of Heidelberg" the old steering committee was removed, and Strauss was elected as president. The subsequent presidents Max von Schillings and Friedrich Rösch were close friends of Strauss, who in 1909 was nominated as Honorary President. Until World War I he dominated the ADMV as has Liszt in former times.

During the last years of Bronsart's time as president discontent arose over the repertoire of the concerts at the Tonkünstler-Versammlungen. In 1896, in Leipzig, for example, works by Alessandro Scarlatti, Pietro Antonio Locatelli, Johann Sebastian Bach, Georg Friedrich Händel and Friedrich II of Prussia as well as works by Brahms, Berlioz, Liszt and Wagner were performed. The works of historical styles met an increasing interest of that time in music of the Baroque or even earlier periods of music history. Performing these works was in congruence with the statutes of the ADMV. Brahms, Berlioz, Liszt and Wagner, however, were more and more regarded as classics. While their works were still performed, works of the present generation of young composers, with exception of Strauss, were missing. The ADMV hence was accused of confusing an esprit de corps, as installed by Liszt, with interests of a diocese or the conceit of a regiment.

Strauss, who did not share the interest in music of historical times, changed the statutes of the ADMV. Its central aim was now cultivating and supporting German musical life in the sense of new developments. The literary department and the paragraphs concerning performances of older works were removed, the Tonkünstler-Versammlungen were renamed as Tonkünstler-Feste (Musicians Festivals), and performances of works of the older "New Germans" were reduced to exceptions. Until World War I, the most frequently performed contemporary composer at the Tonkünstler-Feste was Strauss himself, but there were also works such as Mahler's Symphonies Nos. III and VI, Pfitzner's Overture Das Christ-Elflein, Reger's Piano Quartet in D minor op.113, The Swan of Tuonela and Lemminkäinen's Return from the Lemminkäinen Suite, Op. 22, of Sibelius, Bartók's Rhapsody Op. 1 for piano and orchestra, and Kodály's String Quartet in C minor.

As president of the ADMV, Strauss was responsible for the complete edition of Liszt's musical works, as projected by the "Franz Liszt Stiftung". In this respect, due to legal difficulties, a delay occurred. The edition was to be undertaken by the publishing-house Breitkopf & Härtel, Leipzig, but the consent of original publishers of Liszt's works was needed. Most of them refused to take part. According to the legal situation of that time, Liszt's works were not free until 30 years after his death, i.e. in 1916. The edition commenced in 1907 with volumes containing works, such as the Symphonic Poems, originally published by Breitkopf & Härtel. Until 1936 further volumes appeared. In the following year 1937, when the ADMV was closed, the Liszt edition, although by far incomplete, was stopped.

=== The ADMV after World War I ===
After World War I, at the Tonkünstler-Fest of 1919 in Berlin, the ADMV restarted with a concert program consisting of Karl Prohaska's Oratorio Frühlingsfeier, Friedrich Klose's Oratorio Der Sonne Geist, Julius Weismann's Lieder auf indische Dichtungen with Trio accompaniment, Siegmund von Hausegger's Aufklänge, Symphonic variations on the nursery-rhyme "Schlaf, Kindchen, schlaf", Georg Schumann's Variationen über ein Thema von Bach, Op. 59, and his scene David und Absalom, Op.70, songs with orchestral accompaniment by Paul Stuiber, the String Quartet, Op.31, by August Reuß, a violin sonata by Julius Kopsch, Richard Strauss' Sechs Lieder, Op. 68, on poems by Clemens Brentano, a string trio by Erwin Lendvai, Paul Juon's tone poem Litania for piano, violin and violoncello, and songs by Heinz Tiessen.

The ADMV was attacked by critics from different sides. According to Bruno Schrader, an ultranationalist of an anti-Semitic inclination, most of the productions as performed at the Tonkünstler-Fest were hyper modern. The songs by Paul Stuiber were caterwauling, and with the songs by Strauss, not fit to be sung as they were, impotence and decadence had reached their height. After World War I had been lost by the "Deutsche Reich", according to Schrader, a cultural retaliatory battle against a French, Belgian and Polish invasion of art had to take place.

Other critics had opposite views. From their perspective, the ADMV was trying to reconstruct the cultural life of the "Deutsche Reich" of Wilhelm II. The "New Germans" thus were regarded as representatives of a misplaced traditionalism. Strauss’s Tone Poems, such as Also sprach Zarathustra, ten years earlier still regarded as avant-garde music, were now viewed as works of times of yore. His Sinfonia Domestica was old-fashioned and even scraping the borders of program music, which was no longer acceptable. His Elektra, premiered in 1909 and at that time attacked as ultra progressive, was old hat.

The ADMV elected new presidents, in 1919 Friedrich Rösch, and in 1925 Siegmund von Hausegger. Until the early 1930s, works of a large scope of different styles, among them works by Arnold Schoenberg, Anton Webern, Alban Berg, Paul Hindemith, Ernst Krenek, Heinz Tiessen and Karol Rathau, were performed. Unavoidably, among the members of the ADMV there were different opinions regarding these works. By some, Hindemith's dance pantomime Der Dämon was taken as evil prank, and Krenek's opera Der Sprung über den Schatten as music of an intellectually overfed brain. Rathau in his Second Symphony had created a dissonant soup. Nevertheless, the ADMV had once again proven itself to be the leading institution of musical progress.

== End of the ADMV ==
Since 1933, after Adolf Hitler had become Chancellor of the "Deutsche Reich", the ADMV was attacked by the National Socialists. During the Tonkünstler-Fest, now being called Tonkünstler-Versammlung again, of that year in Dortmund, the "Reichsministerium für Volksaufklärung und Propaganda" (Ministry for the Enlightening of the People and Propaganda) of Joseph Goebbels made known that a reorganization of cultural life had to take place. In November 1933, as part of Goebbels' Ministry, a Reichsmusikkammer ("Imperial Music Chamber"), directed by Richard Strauss, was installed, responsible for all parts of German musical life. In July 1935 Strauss had to resign due to his collaboration with Jewish artists, especially with Stefan Zweig, librettist of the opera Die schweigsame Frau. His successor, until his death on 12 April 1945, was Peter Raabe.

Siegmund von Hausegger, until then president of the ADMV, suggested his resignation in favour of Raabe, who should be elected instead. The suggestion was accepted, since leading members hoped, with Raabe's uniting both positions the ADMV could maintain independence; but this was an error. In 1936, at the Tonkünstler-Versammlung in Leipzig, Raabe read out a letter to the general assembly of the ADMV. It was a letter by some National Socialistic members to Paul Graener, rector of the composers department at the Reichsmusikkammer, with complaints about the steering committee of the ADMV. Suggestions by National Socialistic organisations had not sufficiently been taken into consideration. Besides, publishing-houses, such as Schott, were supported by the ADMV, although their catalogues were promoting the works of Jewish composers. The ADMV was also accused of being reigned by a "black-red coalition".

After a heated debate with further accusations against Joseph Haas, Siegmund von Hausegger, Hermann Abendroth and Richard Strauss, the authors of the letter apologized. The letter, however, together with two further ones in which the liquidation of the ADMV was demanded, had been sent to the Gestapo. In December 1936, Raabe told the leading committee, Goebbels had said to him that the ADMV should be dissolved. Raabe tried to convince his colleagues that the Reichsmusikkammer was the proper cultural advocate of musicians. He also assured them that future Tonkünstler-Feste would be as marvellous as the Nazi Rallies in Nuremberg. As Raabe found no support in decisions of two further general assemblies, in June and November 1937, the ADMV was closed.

In 1937, in Darmstadt and Frankfurt, a last Tonkünstler-Versammlung with concerts took place. As last pieces, Liszt's Symphonic Poem Orpheus, his Piano Concerto No. 1 in E♭ major, and the Faust Symphony were played. The Faust Symphony, in its final version, had for the first time been performed at the Tonkünstler-Versammlung of 1861 in Weimar, where the foundation of the ADMV had taken place. A circle had closed. With the sounds of the Chorus mysticus "Alles Vergängliche ist nur ein Gleichnis" (Anything perishable is only a symbol) the ADMV dismissed itself from history.

== Bibliography ==
- Kaminiarz, Irina (ed.): Richard Strauss, Briefe aus dem Archiv des Allgemeinen Deutschen Musikvereins 1888–1909, Weimar 1995.
- Lucke-Kaminiarz, Irina: Der Allgemeine Deutsche Musikverein und seine Tonkünstlerfeste 1859–1886, in: Altenburg (ed.): Neudeutsche Schule, pp. 221ff.
- Pohl, Richard: Die Leipziger Tonkünstler-Versammlung, Erster Artikel, in: Neue Zeitschrift für Musik, 50 (1859), pp.282ff and 289ff.
- Raabe, Peter: Liszts Schaffen, Cotta, Stuttgart und Berlin 1931.
- Wagner, Richard, and Liszt, Franz: Briefwechsel zwischen Wagner und Liszt, 3. erweiterte Auflage, ed. Erich Kloss, Leipzig 1910.
- Walker, Alan: Franz Liszt, The Weimar Years (1848–1861), Cornell University Press 1989.
- Walter, Michael: Richard Strauss und seine Zeit, Laaber-Verlag, Laaber 2000.
