= Detlef Altenburg =

German musicologist

- Born: January 9, 1947; Hersfeld, Germany
- Died: February 8, 2016; Regensburg, Germany
- Occupation: Musicologist
- Board member of: President of the Gesellschaft für Musikforschung (2001–2009); Presidency of the Deutscher Musikrat (2003–2009)

Academic background
- Education: University of Marburg; University of Cologne

Academic work
- Institutions: University of Cologne; University of Göttingen; New University of Lisbon; University of Paderborn; Hochschule für Musik Detmold; Musikwissenschaftliches Seminar Detmold/Paderborn [de] University of Regensburg; Hochschule für Musik Franz Liszt, Weimar; Friedrich-Schiller-Universität Jena
- Main interests: Music of the 17th and 18th centuries Music and musical views of the 19th century Franz Liszt
- Notable works: Numerous publications concerning Franz Liszt

Detlef Altenburg (9 January 1947 – 8 February 2016) was a German musicologist.

== Life and career ==
Born in Hersfeld, Altenburg studied musicology, Protestant theology, religious studies and philosophy in University of Marburg and University of Cologne, where he received his doctorate in 1973. He remained there as Wissenschaftlicher Assistent and habilitated in 1980. In 1980/81 he took over a substitute professorship at the University of Göttingen. In 1983 he held a visiting professorship at the New University of Lisbon. From 1983 to 1994 he taught at the University of Paderborn and at the Hochschule für Musik Detmold and the Musikwissenschaftliches Seminar Detmold/Paderborn. From 1994 to 1999 he was Lehrstuhl and director of the Institute for Musicology at the University of Regensburg. In 1999 he accepted an appointment at the Hochschule für Musik Franz Liszt, Weimar and was director of the joint institute for musicology of the HfM Weimar and the Friedrich-Schiller-Universität Jena from November 1999 until his retirement. His scientific work focused on music of the 17th and 18th centuries as well as music and musical views of the 19th century. Numerous publications by Altenburg concerned Franz Liszt.

From 2001 to 2009 Altenburg was president of the Gesellschaft für Musikforschung. Besides, he belonged to the presidency of the Deutscher Musikrat from 2003 to 2009. Furthermore, he was member of the Akademie gemeinnütziger Wissenschaften zu Erfurt since 2000 and since 2006 full member of the Sächsische Akademie der Wissenschaften. He was a member of the Academia Europaea.

Altenburg died in Regensburg at age 69.

== Publications ==
See Altenburg on WorldCat

== Honours and awards ==
- Bundesverdienstkreuz am Bande of the Order of Merit of the Federal Republic of Germany (2010)
