= Neue Zeitschrift für Musik =

German music magazine

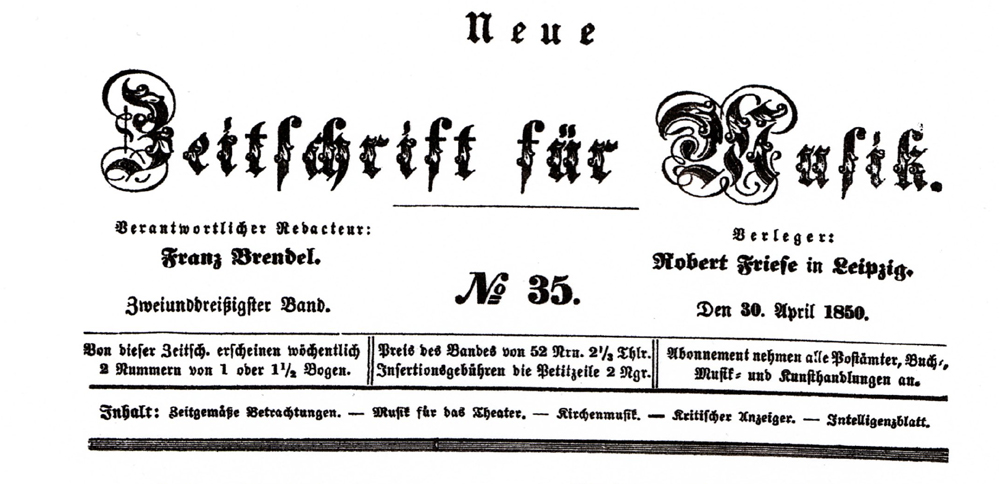
- Front page banner of NZM, issue of 30 April 1850.
- Categories: Music
- Frequency: Monthly
- Founder: Robert Schumann, Friedrich Wieck, Julius Knorr and; Ludwig Schuncke
- Company: Schott Music
- Country: Germany
- Language: German
- Website: musikderzeit.de
- ISSN: 0945-6945

The New Journal of Music (Neue Zeitschrift für Musik, pronounced [ˈnɔʏə ˈtsaɪt.ʃʁɪft fyːɐ̯ muˈziːk] and abbreviated to NZM) is a music magazine, co-founded in Leipzig by Robert Schumann, his teacher and future father-in law Friedrich Wieck, Julius Knorr and his close friend Ludwig Schuncke. Its first issue appeared on 3 April 1834. Its motto was a quotation from the prologue of William Shakespeare's Henry VIII, upholding the dignity of great art and scorning the inferior.

== History ==
Although the first editor was Julius Knorr, most of the work on the early issues of the Neue Zeitschrift (NZM) was done by Schumann; in 1835, when a new publisher was found, Schumann's name appeared as editor. In his reviews, he praised those of the new generation of musicians who deserved acclaim, including Frédéric Chopin and Hector Berlioz. Schuncke wrote some articles under the byline "Jonathan" but died at the age of 23 in December 1834.

In June 1843, Schumann's other commitments made him give up editorship of the magazine, and in 1844 Franz Brendel became owner and editor. Under his tenure, the most notable piece was Richard Wagner's anti-Jewish article "Das Judenthum in der Musik", published under the pseudonym K. Freigedank ('Freethought') in volume 33, no. 19 (3 September 1850). Ignaz Moscheles and other teachers at the Leipzig Conservatory were outraged and called for Brendel's resignation from its board. Wagner's article had insulted the memory of Felix Mendelssohn, the conservatory's founder—but had little further effect at the time. Later in the nineteenth century, it contributed to the rise in anti-semitism, including criticism of music by Jewish composers who differed in style from Wagner. Brendel continued to edit the magazine until his death in 1868.

== NZM today ==
The Neue Zeitschrift für Musik, under the aegis of Schott Music, continues as a vehicle for writing on music, including classical, jazz, rock, and sound art. Each issue focuses on a particular topic, and includes a variety of essays, CD and book reviews.
