= Aquilon =

Aquilon is a name derived from Aquilo, the Latin term for the north-east wind.

Aquilon may also refer to:

== Ships ==
- HMS Aquilon, several ships
- Spanish ship Aquilon, 68-gun ship of the line
- French ship Aquilon, several ships

== Other uses ==
- L'Aquilon, a Canadian weekly newspaper
- SNCASE Aquilon, a series of aircraft produced by the French manufacturer SNCASE.
- The trademark of KOSEKI Aquila Raphael, the Japanese theatre and film producer
- The poem Les Aquilons (The North Winds), by the French poet Joseph Autran.
- Les Aquilons, part 2 of the choral work Les quatre élémens by Franz Liszt, based on Autran's poem
- The character Aquilon in the mythological novels of Rick Riordan.
- The 3rd generation CMDB component of the Quattor project.
