= HMS Aquilon =

Three ships of the Royal Navy have been named HMS Aquilon, to commemorate the destruction of the French ship Aquilon by HMS Antelope in 1757. Aquilon was originally the Roman name for the North Wind.

- HMS Aquilon (1758) of 1758 was a sixth-rate frigate which served in the navy until 1776.
- HMS Aquilon (1786) of 1786 was a fifth-rate frigate during the French Revolutionary and Napoleonic Wars, broken up in 1815.
- HMS Aquilon was a small warship which was renamed HMS Conquerant before commissioning.

Another Aquilon was captured in Havana in 1762 and commissioned into the Royal Navy, serving until 1770.
