= Les Quatre Élémens =

Choral works by Franz Liszt

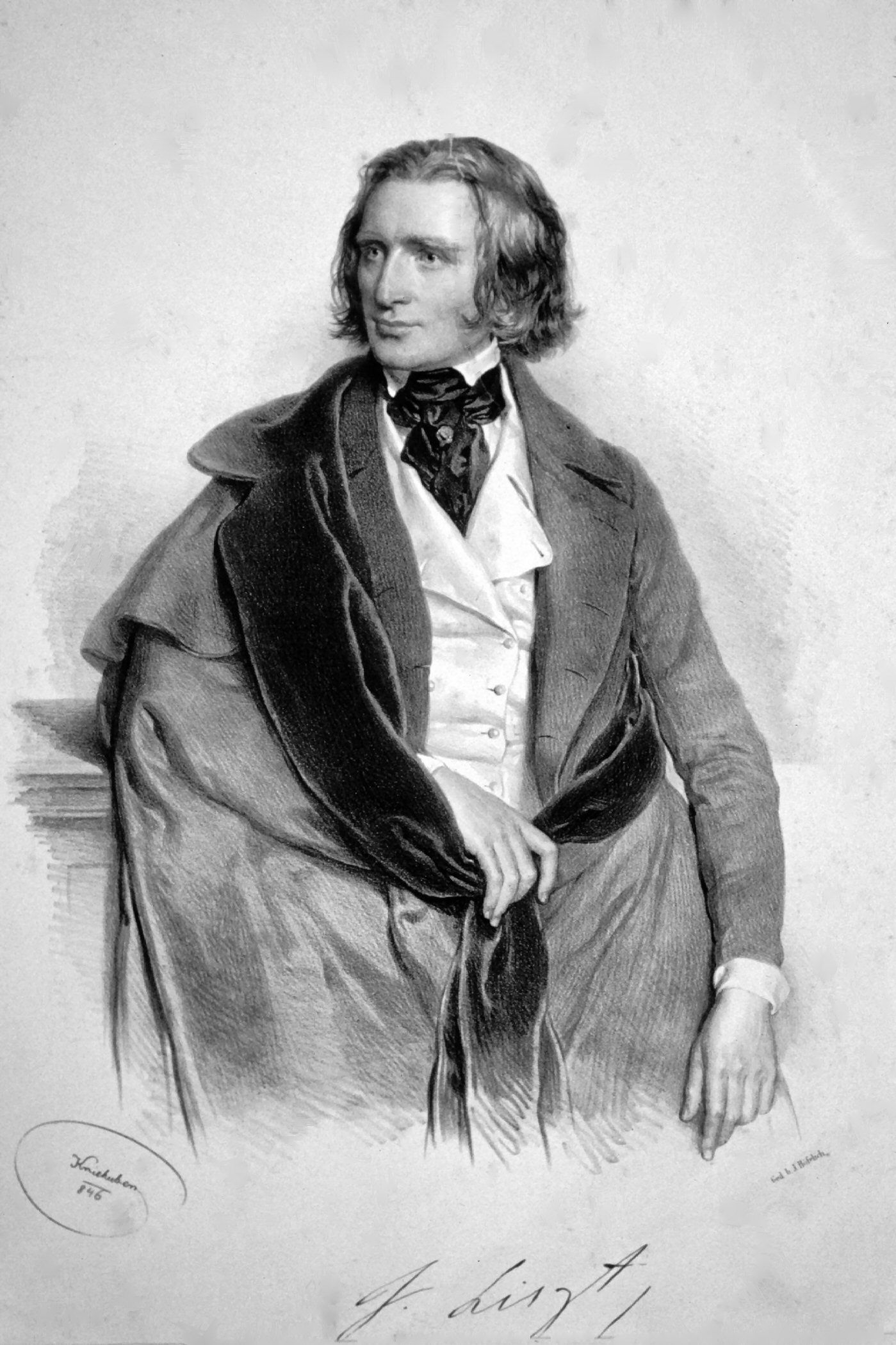
Franz Liszt, c. 1846

Les Quatre Élémens (The Four Elements), S.80, is a cycle of four choral pieces by Franz Liszt, to words by Joseph Autran. The cycle was composed in 1844–48, originally with piano accompaniment, later orchestrated. The title is an allusion to the Ancient Greek elements: earth, air, water, and fire. As an afterthought, Liszt composed an overture for the cycle in 1849–50, but this was instead revised to become his symphonic poem Les Préludes.

== Genesis ==
Liszt's starting-point for the cycle was Les Aquilons ("The North Winds"), a male chorus with piano accompaniment composed on 24 July 1844 in Marseille. Liszt had arrived in Marseille the day before and met with choristers of a German travelling company, who requested an original chorus piece of the composer. The poet Joseph Autran, whom Liszt had visited, offered him the poem Les Aquilons. In the afternoon of the 24th, Liszt composed the piece. The work was performed on 6 August at Liszt's fourth concert in Marseille. The accompaniment was on two pianos, one played by Liszt himself.

== The cycle ==
Besides Les Aquilons, Autran gave three further poems to Liszt: La Terre ("The Earth"), Les Flots ("The Floods") and Les Astres ("The Stars"), and Liszt also set these to music. As a series, La Terre, Les Aquilons, Les Flots and Les Astres formed a cycle Les Quatre Élémens ("The Four Elements"). The title of the cycle was an allusion to the Ancient Greek concept of the four elements, the four poems respectively being a reference to each of those elements: earth, air, water, and fire.

La Terre and Les Flots were composed in Spring 1845 during Liszt's tour through Spain and Portugal. However, the precise dates are still not clear. The four pieces of Les Quatre Élémens were never published, and the only performance given was that of Les Aquilons on 6 August 1844. The manuscripts are preserved in the Goethe- und Schiller-Archiv in Weimar. Their catalogue number is S.80. For the manuscripts of La Terre and Les Flots, Emil Haraszti and Theodor Müller-Reuter give the dates "Lisbon and Málaga, April 1845" and "Valencia, Easter Sunday 1845", respectively. Concerning the manuscript of Les astres, neither a place nor a date is available; Haraszti gives 14 April 1845, as the date.

In a letter to Autran of 7 August 1852, Liszt reminded the poet of the four texts that he had given him, and confirmed that he had long ago completed their settings. This was perhaps the first time that Autran received information concerning the whereabouts of his poems. The poems themselves were published in 1856.

== Orchestration and Overture ==
The earliest sources for attempts of orchestrating the cycle Les Quatre Élémens are written in the hand of Liszt's copyist, August Conradi, in early 1848. A score exists in the hand of Liszt's disciple and amanuensis Joachim Raff of an Ouvertüre des Quatre Élémens with a four-page correction in Liszt's hand, headed "4 Elements Seite 25", and datable to 1850.

The Overture was substantially reworked by Liszt a few years later to become the symphonic poem Les Préludes (The Beginnings).

== Selected recordings ==
- on Liszt: Choral Works for Male Voices, Gergely Boganyi (piano), Honved Ensemble Male Choir, Istvan Parkai Hungaroton

== Bibliography ==
- Bonner, Andrew: Liszt's Les Préludes and Les Quatre Élémens: A Reinvestigation, in 19th-Century Music, 10 (1986), p. 95ff.
- Eckhardt, Maria: Liszt à Marseille, in Studia Musicologica Academiae Scientarum Hungaricae 24 (1982), p. 163ff.
- Haraszti, Emile: Génèse des préludes de Liszt qui n'ont aucun rapport avec Lamartine, in Révue de musicologie 35 (1953), p. 111ff.
- Müller-Reuter, Theodor: Lexikon der deutschen Konzertliteratur, 1. Band, Leipzig 1909.
- Raabe, Peter: Liszts Schaffen, Cotta, Stuttgart, Berlin 1931.
