= The Shipwreck (Turner) =

Painting by J. M. W. Turner

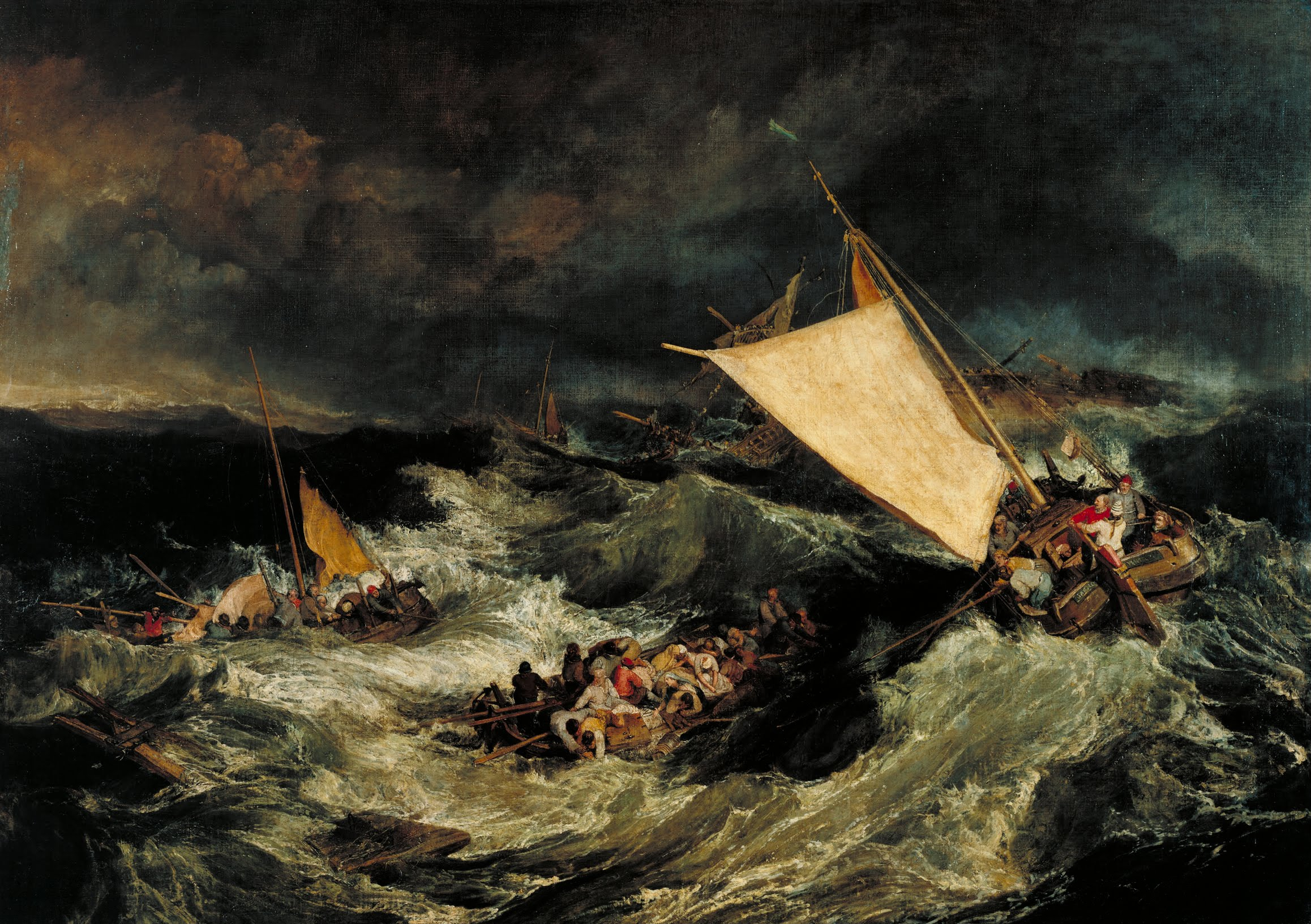
- Artist: J. M. W. Turner
- Year: 1805
- Medium: oil on canvas
- Dimensions: 170.5 cm × 241.5 cm (67.1 in × 95.1 in)
- Location: Tate Britain, London
- Website: www.tate.org.uk/...n00476

The Shipwreck is a landscape painting by J. M. W. Turner in the collection of the Tate. It was completed around 1805, when it was exhibited in Turner's own gallery in Queen Anne Street. The painting is an important example of the sublime in British art.

It is thought that the picture probably records the then recent sinking of the Earl of Abergavenny, which foundered off Weymouth in Dorset on 4 February 1805.

== See also ==
- List of paintings by J. M. W. Turner
