= French ship Aquilon =

At least three ships of the French Navy have been named Aquilon

- French frigate Aquilon (1733), a fifth-rate ship, sunk by HMS Antelope in 1757
- French ship Aquilon (1789), a Téméraire-class ship of the line.
- French ship Aquilon (1803), a Téméraire-class ship of the line.
