= Joseph Autran =

French poet (1813–1877)

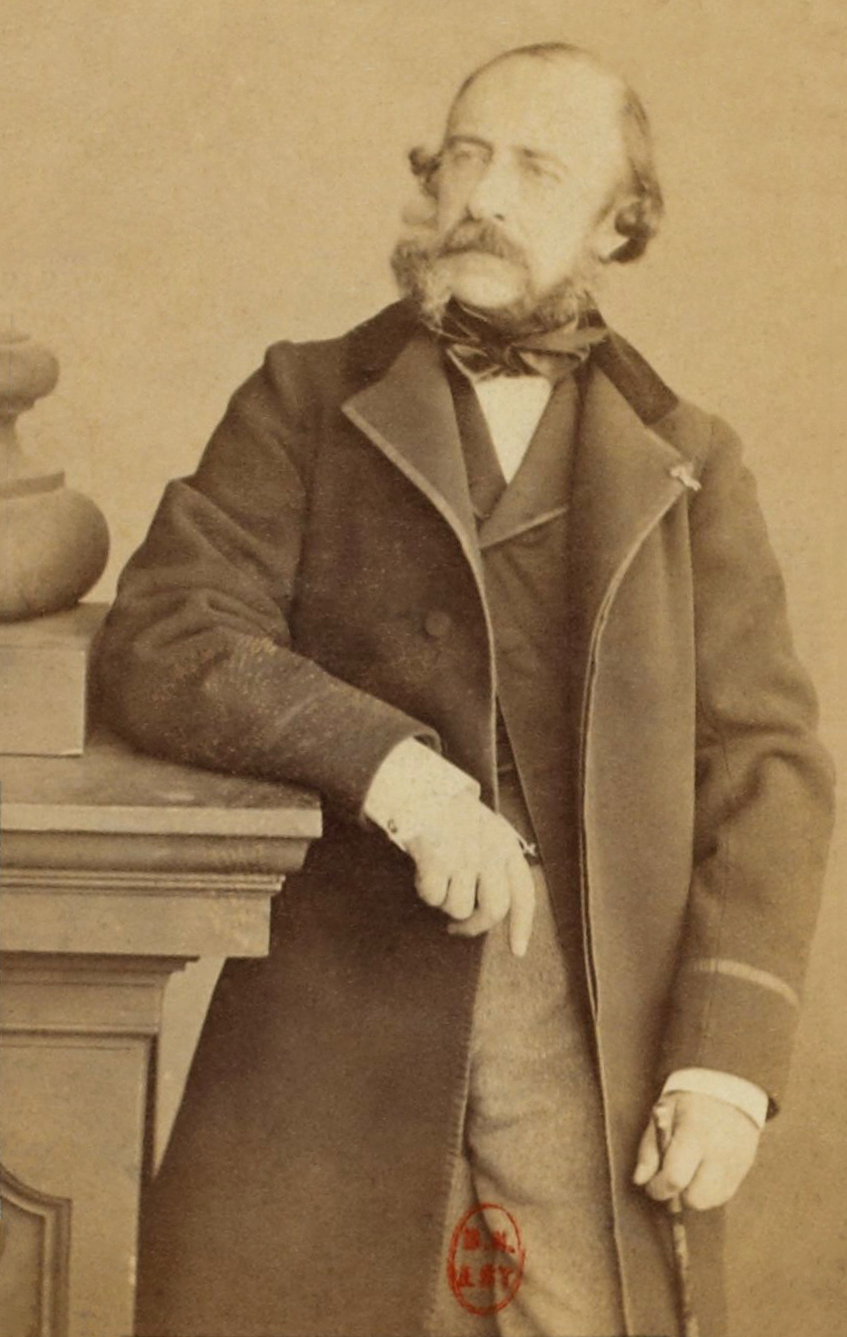
- circa 1860s
- Born: 20 June 1813; Marseille, France
- Died: 6 March 1877 (aged 63); Marseille, France
- Occupation: Poet

Joseph Autran (20 June 1813 – 6 March 1877) was a French poet.

== Biography ==
Autran was born in Marseille. In 1832 he addressed an ode to Alphonse de Lamartine, who was then at Marseille on his way to the East. Lamartine persuaded the young man's father to allow him to follow his poetic instinct, and Autran became Lamartine's faithful disciple from then on.

His best known work is La Mer (1835), remodelled in 1852 as Les Poèmes de la mer. Ludibria ventis (1838) followed, and the success of these two volumes gained for Autran the librarianship of his native town.

In 1844/5 Franz Liszt, who met Autran in Marseille in 1844, set four of his poems, La terre, Les aquilons, Les flots and Les astres, for choir and piano as a cycle, Les quatre élémens.

Autran's other important work is his Vie rurale (1856), a series of pictures of peasant life. The Algerian campaigns inspired him with verses in honour of the common soldier. Milianah (1842) describes the heroic defence of that town, and in the same vein is his Laboureurs et soldats (1854).

Among his other works are the Paroles de Salomon (1868), Épîtres rustiques (1861), Sonnets capricieux, and a tragedy played with great success at the Odéon in 1848, La Fille d'Eschyle. A definitive edition of his works was brought out between 1875 and 1881.

He became a member of the Académie française in 1868, and died at Marseille nine years later.

== Works ==
- Le Départ pour l'Orient : ode à M. Alphonse de Lamartine (1832)
- La Mer : poésies (1835)
- Ludibria ventis : poésies nouvelles (1838)
- L'An 40 : ballades et poésies musicales, suivies de Marseille (1840)
- Milianah : poème (1841)
- Italie et Semaine sainte à Rome (1841)
- La Fille d'Eschyle : étude antique en 5 actes, en vers, Paris, Théâtre de l'Odéon, 9 mars 1848
- Les Poëmes de la mer (1852)
- Laboureurs et soldats (1854)
- La Vie rurale : tableaux et récits (1856)
- Etienne et Clémentine (1858)
- Épîtres rustiques (1861)
- Le Poème des beaux jours (1862)
- Le Cyclope, d'après Euripide (1863)
- Paroles de Salomon (1869)
- Sonnets capricieux (1873)
- La Légende des paladins (1875)
- Œuvres complètes (1875–82)
