= Franz Liszt =

Hungarian composer and pianist (1811–1886)

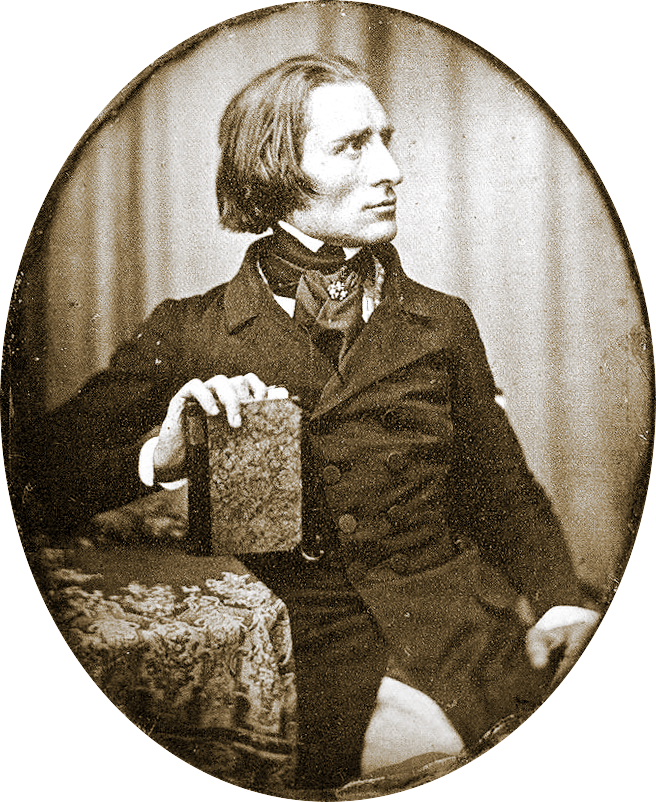
- Liszt in 1843
- Born: 22 October 1811; Doborján, Kingdom of Hungary
- Died: 31 July 1886 (aged 74); Bayreuth, German Empire
- Works: List of compositions
- Partners: Marie d'Agoult (1833–1839); Carolyne zu Sayn-Wittgenstein (1847)
- Children: 3, including Cosima Wagner

Signature
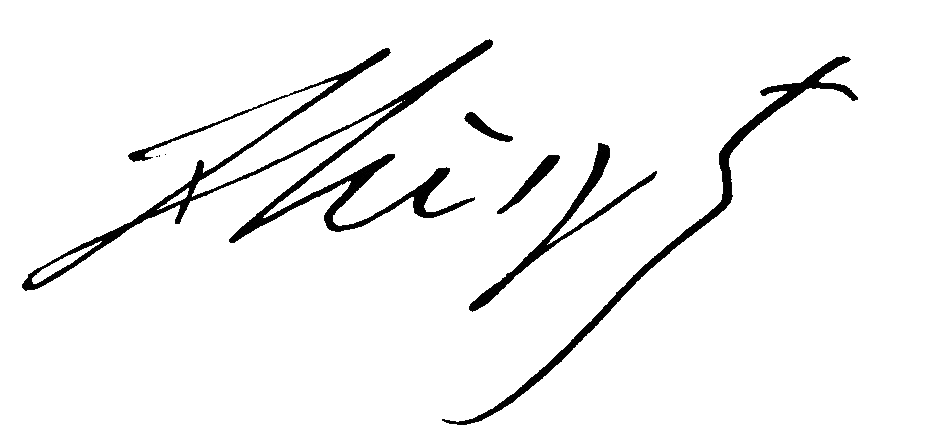

Franz Liszt (Note: /lɪst/; German: [ˈlɪst]; Hungarian: Liszt Ferencz, in modern usage Liszt Ferenc [ˈlist ˈfɛrɛnt͡s]. Liszt's Hungarian passport spelled his given name as "Ferencz". An orthographic reform of the Hungarian language in 1922 (which was 36 years after Liszt's death) changed the letter "cz" to simply "c" in all words except surnames; this has led to Liszt's given name being rendered in modern Hungarian usage as "Ferenc". From 1859 to 1867 he was officially Franz Ritter von Liszt; he was created a Ritter (knight) by Emperor Francis Joseph I in 1859, but never used this title of nobility in public. The title was necessary to marry the Princess Carolyne zu Sayn-Wittgenstein without her losing her privileges, but after the marriage fell through, Liszt transferred the title to his uncle Eduard in 1867. Eduard's son was Franz von Liszt.) (22 October 1811 – 31 July 1886) was a Hungarian composer, virtuoso pianist, conductor and teacher of the Romantic period. With a diverse body of work spanning more than six decades, he is considered to be one of the most prolific and influential composers of his era, and his piano works continue to be widely performed and recorded.

Liszt achieved success as a concert pianist from an early age and received lessons from the esteemed musicians Carl Czerny and Antonio Salieri. He gained further renown for his performances during tours of Europe in the 1830s and 1840s, developing a reputation for technical brilliance as well as physical attractiveness. In a phenomenon dubbed "Lisztomania", he rose to a degree of stardom and popularity among the public not experienced by the virtuosos who had preceded him.

During this period and into his later life, Liszt was a friend, musical promoter and benefactor to many composers of his time, including Hector Berlioz, Frédéric Chopin, Robert Schumann, Clara Schumann and Richard Wagner, among others. Liszt was the first to apply the terms "transcription" and "paraphrase" to music, and would perform arrangements of his contemporaries' music to popularise it. Alongside Wagner, Liszt was one of the most prominent representatives of the New German School, a progressive group of composers involved in the "War of the Romantics" who developed ideas of programmatic music and harmonic experimentation.

Liszt taught piano performance to hundreds of students throughout his life, many of whom went on to become notable performers. He left behind an extensive and diverse body of work that influenced his forward-looking contemporaries and anticipated 20th-century ideas and trends. Among Liszt's musical contributions are the concept of the symphonic poem, innovations in thematic transformation and Impressionism in music, and the invention of the masterclass as a method of teaching performance. In a radical departure from his earlier compositional styles, many of Liszt's later works also feature experiments in atonality, foreshadowing developments in 20th-century classical music. Today he is best known for his original piano works, such as the Hungarian Rhapsodies, Années de pèlerinage, Transcendental Études, "La campanella", and the Piano Sonata in B minor.

== Life ==
=== Early life ===
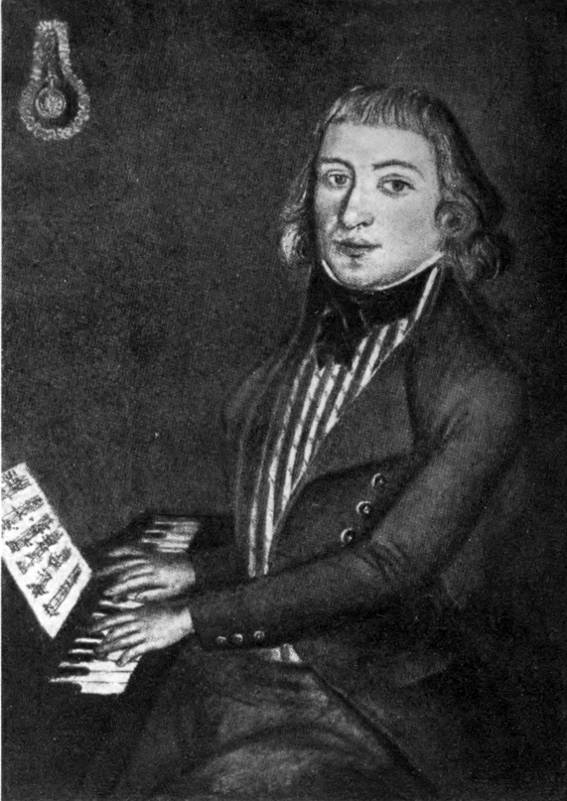
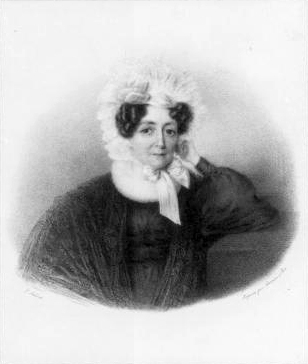
Franz Liszt's father Adam Liszt (left), and mother Anna Liszt (right)

Franz Liszt was born to Anna Liszt (née Maria Anna Lager) and Adam Liszt on 22 October 1811, in the village of Doborján (now Raiding, Austria) in Sopron County, Kingdom of Hungary, which was part of the Habsburg monarchy. (Note: His birthplace is now a museum. Throughout his life, he claimed to be Magyar, rather than German, and referred to Hungary as his homeland. When later in his life he gave charity concerts in Hungary, he sometimes appeared wearing national dress. (Walker 1987, p. 48)) Liszt's father was a land steward in the service of Prince Nikolaus II Esterházy; a keen amateur musician, he played the piano, guitar and flute, and knew Joseph Haydn and Johann Nepomuk Hummel personally. A renowned child prodigy, Franz began to improvise at the piano from before the age of five, and his father diligently encouraged his progress. Franz also found exposure to music through attending Mass, as well as travelling Romani bands that toured the Hungarian countryside. His first public concert was in Sopron in 1820 at the age of nine; its success led to further appearances in Pressburg and for Prince Nikolaus' court in Eisenstadt.

The publicity led to a group of wealthy sponsors offering to finance Franz's musical education in Vienna, where he received piano lessons from Carl Czerny, who in his own youth had been a student of Ludwig van Beethoven and Johann Nepomuk Hummel. Czerny, already extremely busy, had only grudgingly agreed to hear Liszt play and had initially refused to entertain the idea of regular lessons. Being so impressed by the initial audition, however, Czerny taught Liszt regularly, free of charge, for the next eighteen months, at which point he felt he had nothing more to teach. Liszt remained grateful to his former teacher, later dedicating to him the Transcendental Études on their 1830 republication. Liszt also received lessons in composition from Antonio Salieri, the accomplished music director of the Viennese court who had previously taught Beethoven and Franz Schubert. Like Czerny, Salieri was highly impressed by Liszt's improvisation and sight-reading abilities.

Liszt's public debut in Vienna on 1 December 1822 was a great success. He was greeted in Austrian and Hungarian aristocratic circles and met Beethoven and Schubert. To build on his son's success, Adam Liszt decided to take the family to Paris, the centre of the artistic world. At Liszt's final Viennese concert on 13 April 1823, Beethoven was reputed to have walked onstage and kissed Liszt on the forehead, to signify a kind of artistic christening. There is debate, however, on the extent to which this story is apocryphal. The family briefly returned to Hungary, and Liszt played a concert in traditional Hungarian dress, in order to emphasise his roots, in May 1823.

In 1824 a piece Liszt had written at the age of 11 – his Variation on a Waltz by Diabelli (S. 147) – appeared in Part II of Vaterländischer Künstlerverein as his first published composition. This volume, commissioned by Anton Diabelli, includes 50 variations on his waltz by 50 different composers (Part I being taken up by Beethoven's 33 variations on the same theme, which are now separately better known simply as his Diabelli Variations). Liszt was the youngest contributor to the project, described in it as "a boy of eleven years old"; Czerny was also a participant.

=== Paris ===
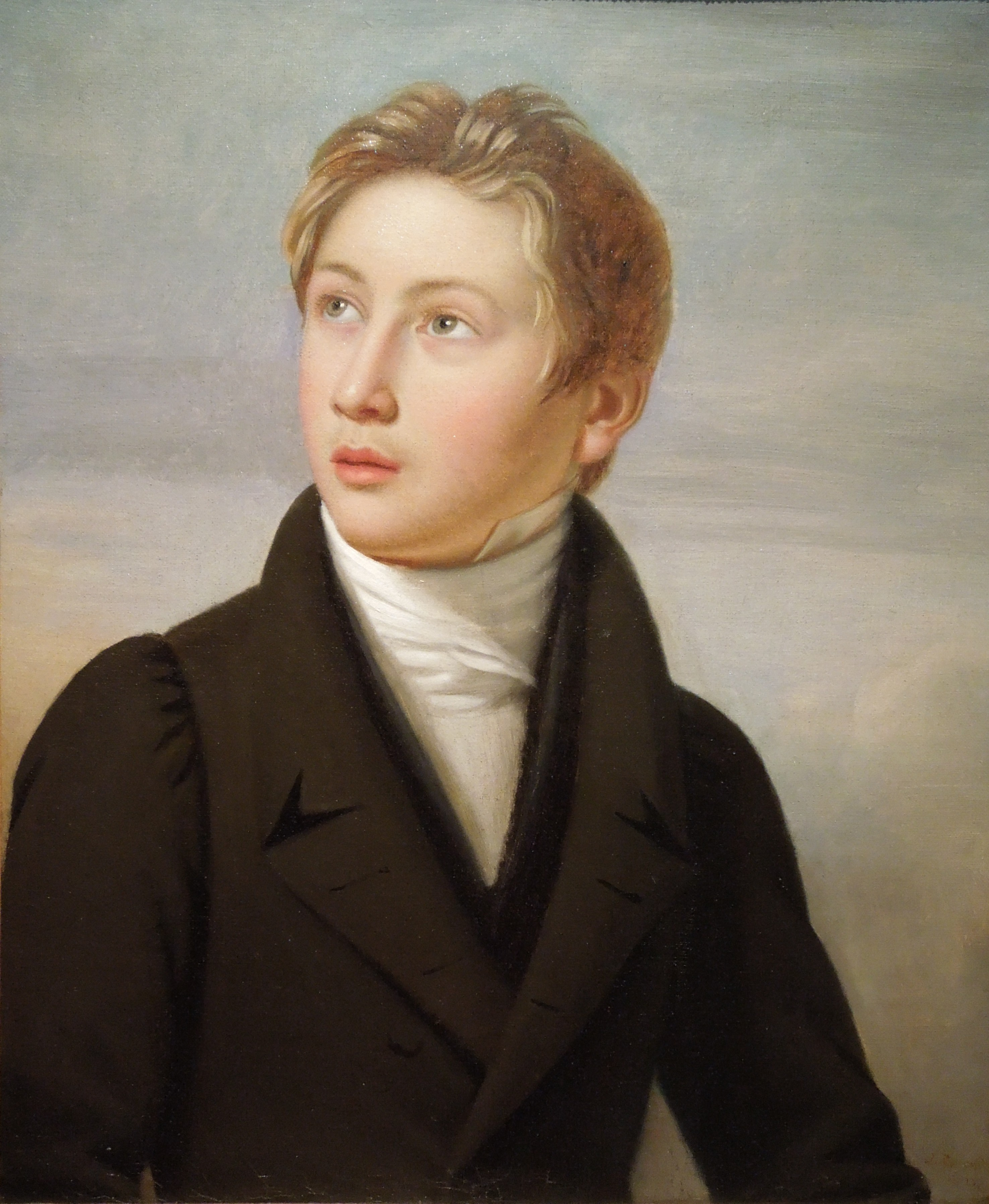
Franz Lizt, vers 14-15 ans, Jean Vignaud (1826)

Having made significant sums from his concerts, Liszt and his family moved to Paris in 1823, with the hope of his attending the Conservatoire de Paris. Even with a letter of recommendation from Chancellor Klemens von Metternich, director Luigi Cherubini refused his entry, however, as the Conservatoire did not accept foreigners. Nevertheless, Liszt studied under Anton Reicha and Ferdinando Paer, and gave a series of highly successful concerts debuting on 8 March 1824. Paer was involved in the Parisian theatrical and operatic scene, and through his connections Liszt staged his only opera, Don Sanche, which premiered shortly before his fourteenth birthday. The premiere was warmly received, but the opera ran for only four performances and is now obscure. Accompanied by his father, Liszt toured France and England, where he played for King George IV.

Adam Liszt died suddenly of typhoid fever in the summer of 1827, and for the next eight years Liszt continued to live in Paris with his mother. He gave up touring, and in order to earn money, he gave lessons on piano and composition, often from early morning until late at night. His students were scattered across the city, and he had to cover long distances. Because of this, he kept uncertain hours and also took up smoking and drinking, habits he would continue throughout his life. During this period Liszt fell in love with one of his pupils, Caroline de Saint-Cricq, the daughter of Charles X's minister of commerce, Pierre de Saint-Cricq. Her father, however, insisted that the affair be broken off.

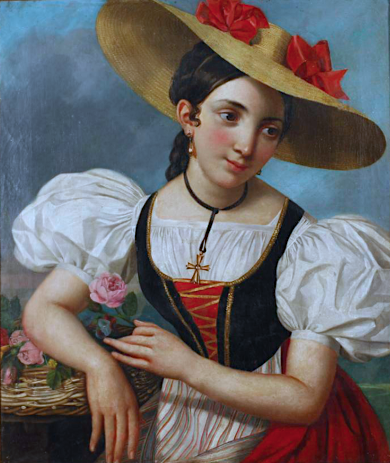
Caroline de Saint-Cricq, (unknown artist, 1828)

Liszt fell very ill, to the extent that an obituary notice was printed in a Paris newspaper, and he underwent a long period of religious doubts and introspection. He stopped playing the piano and giving lessons, and he developed an intense interest in religion, having many conversations with Abbé de Lamennais and Chrétien Urhan, a German-born violinist who introduced him to the Saint-Simonists. Lamennais dissuaded Liszt from becoming a monk or priest. Urhan was an early champion of Schubert, inspiring Liszt's own lifelong love of Schubert's songs. Much of Urhan's emotive music which moved beyond the Classical paradigm, such as Elle et moi, La Salvation angélique and Les Regrets, may have helped to develop Liszt's taste and style.

During this period Liszt came into contact with many of the leading authors and artists of his day, including Victor Hugo, Alphonse de Lamartine, George Sand and Alfred de Vigny. He composed practically nothing in the years between his father's death and the July Revolution of 1830, which inspired him to sketch a symphony based on the events of the "three glorious days" (this piece was left unfinished, and was later reworked as Héroïde funèbre). Liszt met Hector Berlioz on 4 December 1830, the day before the premiere of the Symphonie fantastique. Berlioz's music made a strong impression on Liszt, and the two quickly became friends. Liszt also befriended Frédéric Chopin around this time.

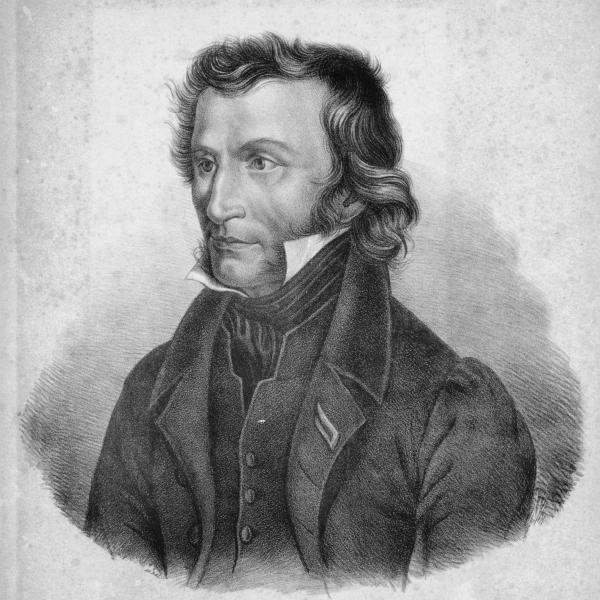
Niccolò Paganini (1828)

After attending a concert featuring Niccolò Paganini in April 1832, Liszt resolved to become as great a virtuoso on the piano as Paganini was on the violin. He dramatically increased his practice, sometimes practising for up to fourteen hours per day, and in 1838 he published the six Études d'exécution transcendante d'après Paganini (later revised as Grandes études de Paganini), aiming to represent Paganini's virtuosity on the keyboard. The process of Liszt completely redeveloping his technique is often described as a direct result of attending Paganini's concert, but it is likely that he had already begun this work previously, during the period 1828–1832.

=== Touring Europe ===
==== Affair with Countess Marie d'Agoult ====
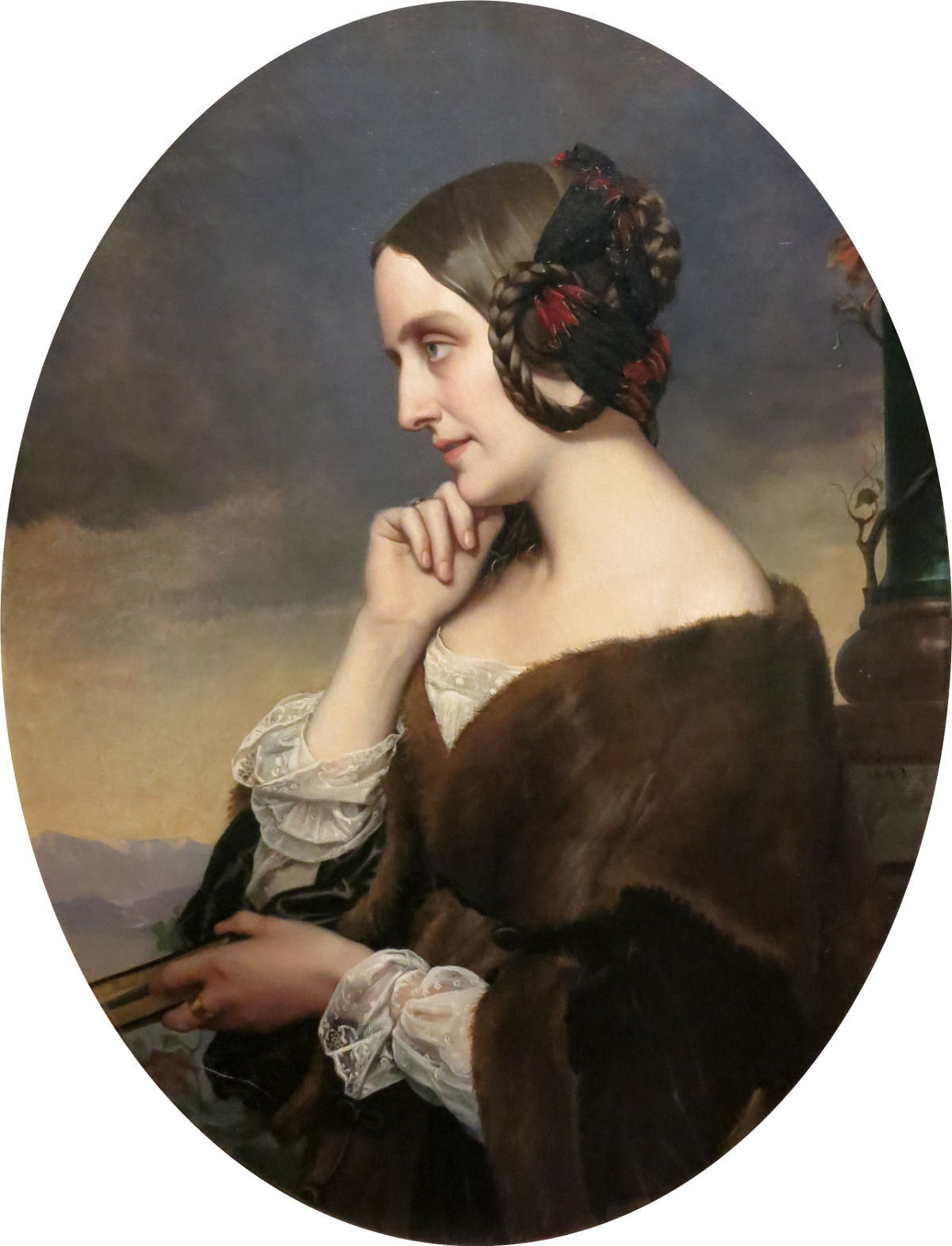
Marie d'Agoult, Henri Lehmann (1843)

In 1833, Liszt began a relationship with the Countess Marie d'Agoult, who was married to a French cavalry officer but living independently. In order to escape scandal they moved to Geneva in 1835; their daughter Blandine was born there on 18 December. Liszt taught at the newly founded Geneva Conservatoire and contributed essays for L'Artiste and the Revue et gazette musicale de Paris.

For the next four years, Liszt and the countess lived together. In 1835 and 1836 they travelled around Switzerland, and from August 1837 until November 1839 they toured Italy. It was these travels that later inspired the composer to write his cycle of piano collections entitled Années de pèlerinage (Years of Pilgrimage). Their daughter Cosima was born in Como on 24 December 1837, and their son Daniel on 9 May 1839 in Rome.

That autumn, relations between them became strained. Liszt heard that plans for a Beethoven Monument in Bonn were in danger of collapse for lack of funds, and he pledged support, raising funds through concerts. The countess returned to Paris with the children, while Liszt gave six concerts in Vienna, then toured Hungary. Liszt would later spend holidays with Marie and their children on the island of Nonnenwerth on the Rhine in the summers of 1841 and 1843. In May 1844, the couple finally separated.

==== The Ivory Duel ====
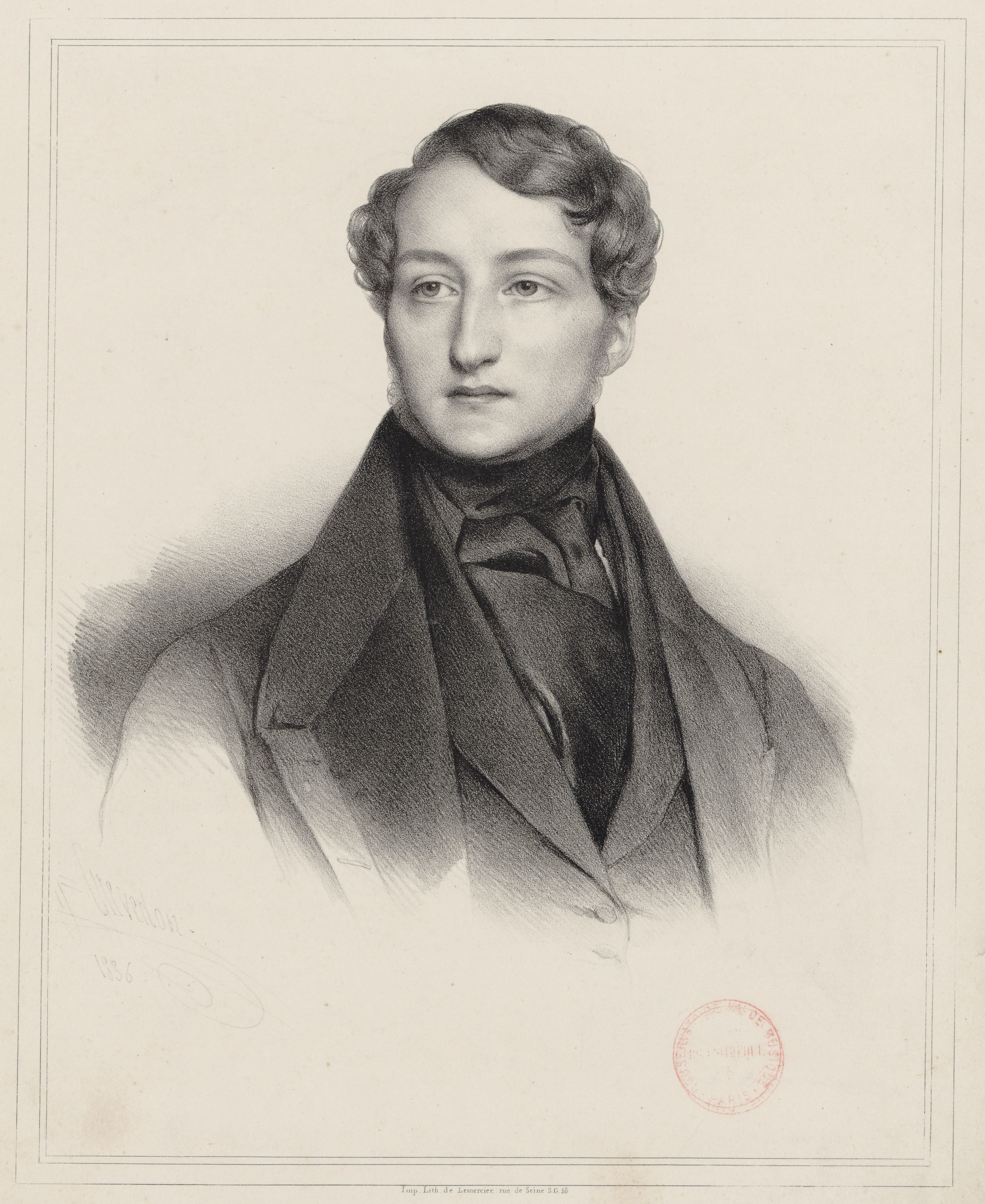
Sigismond Thalberg (1836)

Sigismond Thalberg moved to Paris in 1835 after several successful years of touring. His concerts there were extremely well received, and Liszt, at the time living in Geneva, received news of them from his friends in Paris. In the autumn of 1836 Liszt published an unfavourable review of several of Thalberg's compositions in the Gazette musicale, calling them "boring" and "mediocre". A published exchange of views ensued between Liszt and Thalberg's supporter, the critic François-Joseph Fétis.

Liszt heard Thalberg perform for the first time at the Paris Conservatoire in February 1837, and to settle the disagreement the two pianists each arranged a performance for the public to compare them the following month. Liszt performed his own Grande fantaisie sur des motifs de Niobe and Carl Maria von Weber's Konzertstück in F minor. This was considered to be inconclusive, so the two agreed to perform at the same concert for comparison on 31 March, at the salon of the Princess of Belgiojoso, in aid of Italian refugees. Thalberg opened with his Fantasia on Rossini's "Moses", then Liszt performed his Niobe fantasy.

The result of this "duel" is disputed. Critic Jules Janin's report in Journal des débats asserts that there was no clear winner: "Two victors and no vanquished; it is fitting to say with the poet, et adhuc sub iudice lis est." Belgiojoso declined to declare a winner, famously concluding that "Thalberg is the first pianist in the world – Liszt is unique." The biographer Alan Walker, however, believes that "Liszt received the ovation of the evening and all doubts about his supremacy were dispelled. As for Thalberg, his humiliation was complete. He virtually disappeared from the concert platform after this date."

==== Lisztomania ====
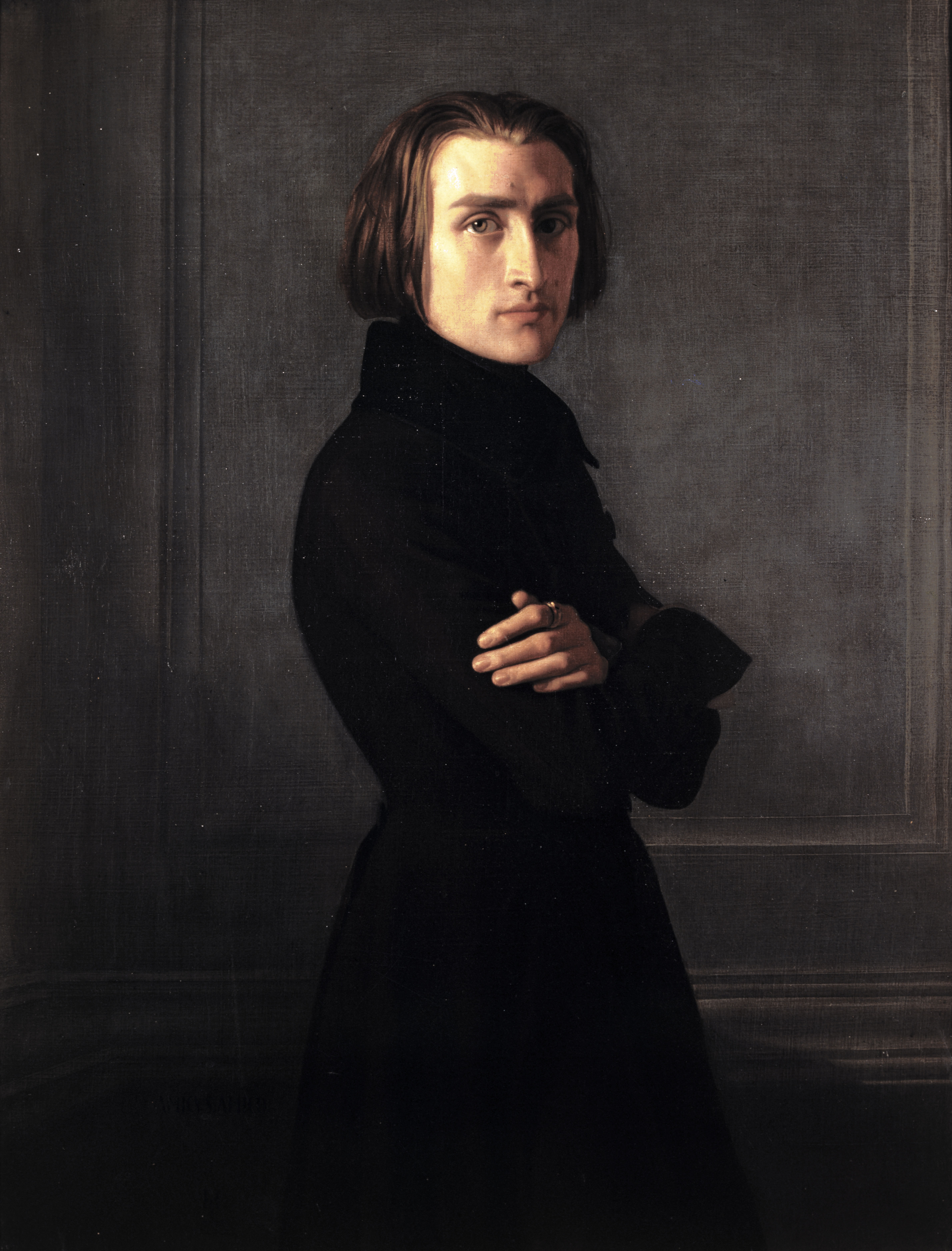
Portrait of Franz Liszt, Henri Lehmann (1839)

After his separation from Marie, Liszt continued to tour Europe. His concerts in Berlin in the winter of 1841–1842 marked the start of a period of immense public enthusiasm and popularity for his performances, dubbed "Lisztomania" by Heinrich Heine in 1844. Heine writes of "magnetism and electricity; of contation in a sultry hall filled with innumerable wax lights and some hundred perfumed and perspiring people; of histrionic epilepsy; of the phenomenon of tickling; of musical cantharides; and other unmentionable matters." In a fashion that has been described as similar to "the mass hysteria associated with revivalist meetings or 20th-century rock stars", women fought over his cigar stubs and coffee dregs, and his silk handkerchiefs and velvet gloves, which they ripped to shreds as souvenirs. This atmosphere was fuelled in great part by the artist's mesmeric personality and stage presence: he was regarded as handsome, and Heine writes of his showmanship during concerts: "How powerful, how shattering was his mere physical appearance".

It is estimated that Liszt appeared in public well over one thousand times during this eight-year period. Moreover, his great fame as a pianist, which he would continue to enjoy long after he had officially retired from the concert stage, was based mainly on his accomplishments during this time.

Adding to his reputation, Liszt gave away much of the proceeds of his work to charity and humanitarian causes. He donated large sums to the building fund of Cologne Cathedral and St. Stephen's Basilica in Pest and made private donations to public services such as hospitals and schools, as well as charitable organisations such as the Leipzig Musicians Pension Fund. After the Great Fire of Hamburg in May 1842, he gave concerts in aid of those left homeless.

During an 1847 tour of Ukraine, then part of the Russian Empire, Liszt played in Kiev, where he met the Polish Princess Carolyne zu Sayn-Wittgenstein. For some time he had been considering retiring from the life of a travelling virtuoso to concentrate on composition, and at this point he made the decision to take up a court position in Weimar. Having known Liszt for only a few weeks, Carolyne resolved to join him there. After a tour of Turkey and Russia that summer, Liszt gave the final paid concert of his career at Elizabetgrad in September, then spent the winter with the princess at her estate in Woronińce. By retiring from the concert platform at the age of 35, while still at the height of his powers, Liszt succeeded in keeping the legend of his playing untarnished.

=== Weimar ===
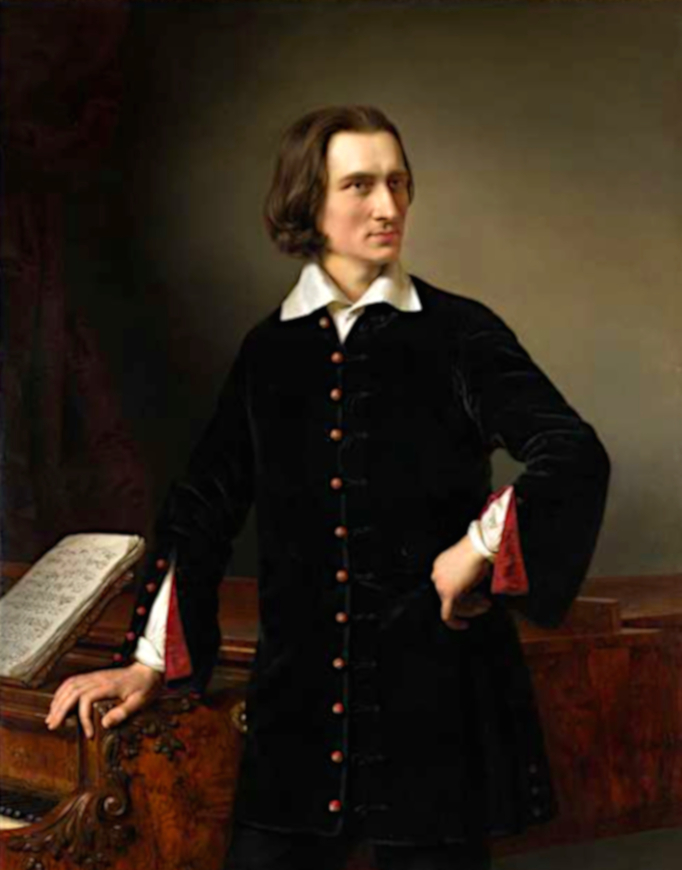
Franz Liszt, portrait by Hungarian painter Miklós Barabás, 1847

In July 1848 Liszt settled in Weimar, where he had been appointed the honorary title of "Kapellmeister Extraordinaire" six years previously. He acted as the official court kapellmeister at the expense of Grand Duchess Maria Pavlovna of Russia until 1859, jointly with Hippolyte André Jean Baptiste Chélard until his retirement in 1852. During this period Liszt acted as conductor at court concerts and on special occasions at the theatre, arranged several festivals celebrating the work of Berlioz and Wagner, and produced the premiere of Lohengrin. He gave lessons to a number of pianists, including the virtuoso Hans von Bülow, who married Liszt's daughter Cosima in 1857 (she would later marry Wagner). Liszt's work during this period made Weimar a nexus for modern music.

As kapellmeister Liszt was required to submit every programme to the court intendant for prior approval. This did not cause large problems until the appointment of Franz von Dingelstedt in 1857, who reduced the number of music productions, rejected Liszt's choices of repertoire, and even organised a demonstration against Liszt's 1858 premiere of Der Barbier von Bagdad. Faced with this opposition, Liszt resigned in 1858.

At first, after arriving in Weimar, Princess Carolyne lived apart from Liszt in order to avoid suspicions of impropriety. She wished eventually to marry Liszt, but since her husband, Russian military officer Prince Nicholas von Sayn-Wittgenstein, was still alive, she had to convince the Roman Catholic authorities that her marriage to him had been invalid. Her appeal to the Archbishop of St Petersburg for an annulment, lodged before leaving Russia, was ultimately unsuccessful, and the couple abandoned pretence and began to live together in the autumn of 1848.

Nicholas was aware that the couple's marriage had effectively ended, and Carolyne and Nicholas reached an agreement to annul in 1850 whereby the prince would receive some of Carolyne's estates. However, this arrangement was struck down in 1851 by the consistory court of Zhytomyr. Throughout the decade the couple would continue to negotiate through the complex situation.

==== The New German School and the War of the Romantics ====
In 1859 Franz Brendel coined the name "New German School" in his publication Neue Zeitschrift für Musik, to refer to the musicians associated with Liszt while he was in Weimar. The most prominent members other than Liszt were Wagner (though he rejected the label) and Berlioz. The group also included Peter Cornelius, Hans von Bülow and Joachim Raff. The school was a loose confederation of progressive composers, mainly grouped together as a challenge to supposed conservatives such as Mendelssohn and Brahms, and so the term is considered to be of limited use in describing a particular movement or set of unified principles. What commonalities the composers had were around the development of programmatic music, harmonic experimentation, wide-ranging modulation and formal innovations such as the use of leitmotifs and thematic transformation.

The disagreements between the two factions is often described as the "War of the Romantics". The "war" was largely carried out through articles, essays and reviews. Each side claimed Beethoven as its predecessor. A number of festivals were arranged to showcase the music of the New German School, notably in Leipzig in 1859 and Weimar in 1861. The Allgemeiner Deutscher Musikverein, intrinsically linked to the School, was founded at this time, with Liszt becoming its honorary president in 1873. However, as most of Liszt's work from the 1860s and 1870s received little attention, and Brendel and Berlioz died in the late 1860s, the focus of the progressive movement in music moved to Bayreuth with Wagner in the 1870s, who definitively moved on from the School and the Neue Zeitschrift.

=== Rome ===
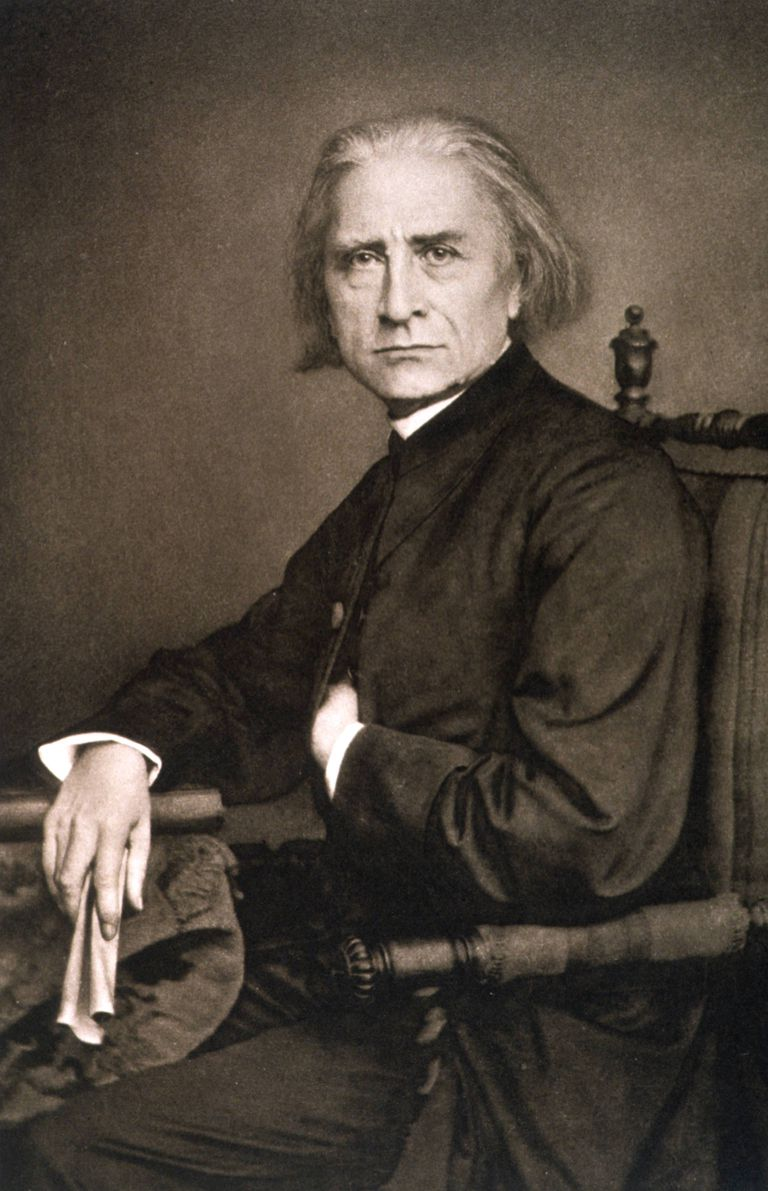
Liszt, photo (mirror-imaged) by Franz Hanfstaengl, June 1870

After a visit to Rome and an audience with Pope Pius IX in 1860, Carolyne finally secured an annulment. It was planned that she and Liszt would marry in Rome, on 22 October 1861, Liszt's 50th birthday. Liszt arrived in Rome on 21 October, but a Vatican official had arrived the previous day in order to stop the marriage. This was a result of the machinations of Cardinal Hohenlohe, who wanted to protect a complex inheritance agreement brokered by Tsar Alexander II. Carolyne subsequently gave up all attempts to marry Liszt, even after her husband's death in 1864; she became a recluse, working for the rest of her life on a long work critical of the Catholic Church.

The 1860s were a period of great sadness in Liszt's private life. On 13 December 1859, he lost his 20-year-old son Daniel to an unknown illness. On 11 September 1862 his 26-year-old daughter Blandine also died, having contracted sepsis after surgery on a breast growth which developed shortly after giving birth to a son she named in memory of Daniel. In letters to friends, Liszt announced that he would retreat to a solitary living.

He moved to the monastery Madonna del Rosario, just outside Rome, where on 20 June 1863 he took up quarters in a small, spartan apartment. He had a piano in his cell, and he continued to compose. He had already joined the Third Order of Saint Francis previously, on 23 June 1857. On 25 April 1865 he received the tonsure at the hands of Cardinal Hohenlohe, who had previously worked against Carolyne's efforts to secure an annulment; the two men became close friends. On 31 July 1865 Liszt received the four minor orders of porter, lector, exorcist and acolyte. After this ordination he was often called "Abbé Liszt". On 14 August 1879, he was made an honorary canon of Albano.

In 1867 Liszt was commissioned to write a piece for the coronation ceremony of Franz Joseph and Elisabeth of Bavaria, and he travelled to Budapest to conduct it. The Hungarian Coronation Mass was performed on 8 June 1867, at the coronation ceremony in the Matthias Church by Buda Castle in a six-section form. After the first performance, the Offertory was added and, two years later, the Gradual.

=== "Tripartite existence" ===
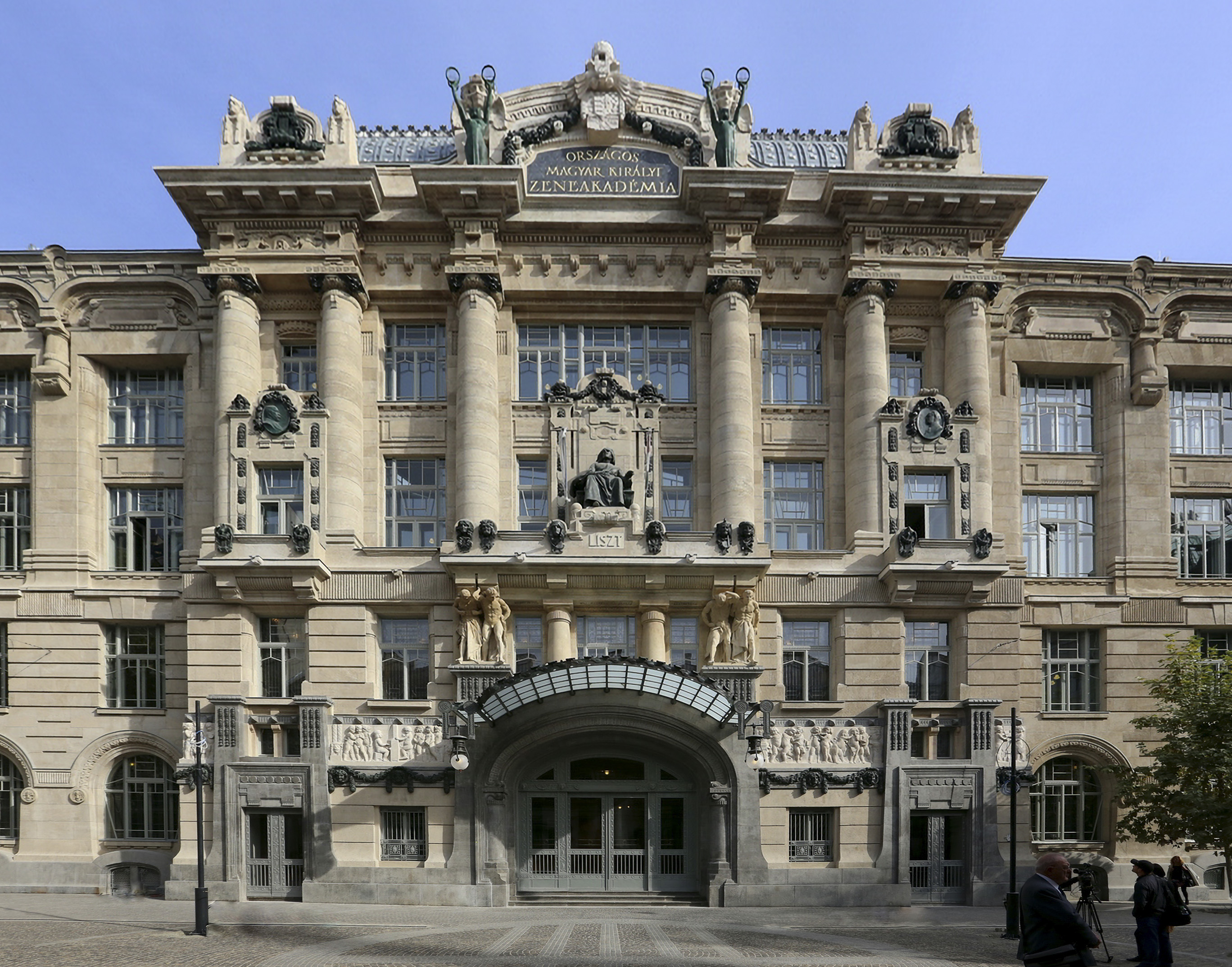
Liszt Ferenc Academy of Music in Budapest

Grand Duke Charles Alexander had been attempting to arrange Liszt's return to Weimar ever since he had left, and in January 1869 Liszt agreed to a residency to give masterclasses in piano playing. He was based in the Hofgärtnerei (court gardener's house), where he taught for the next seventeen years. From 1872 until the end of his life, Liszt made regular journeys between Rome, Weimar and Budapest, continuing what he called his vie trifurquée ("tripartite existence"). It is estimated that he travelled at least 6,400 km (4,000 mi) a year during this period in his life – an exceptional figure given his advancing age and the rigors of road and rail in the 1870s.

Liszt's time in Budapest was the result of efforts from the Hungarian government in attracting him to work there. The plan of the foundation of the Royal Academy of Music was agreed upon by the Hungarian Parliament in 1873, and in March 1875 Liszt was nominated its president. The academy was officially opened on 14 November 1875 with Liszt's colleague Ferenc Erkel as director and Kornél Ábrányi and Robert Volkmann on the staff. Liszt himself only arrived to deliver lessons in March 1876. From 1881 when in Budapest he would stay in an apartment in the Academy, where he taught pupils in much the same way as he did in Weimar. In 1925, the institution was renamed in honour of Liszt.

=== Final years ===
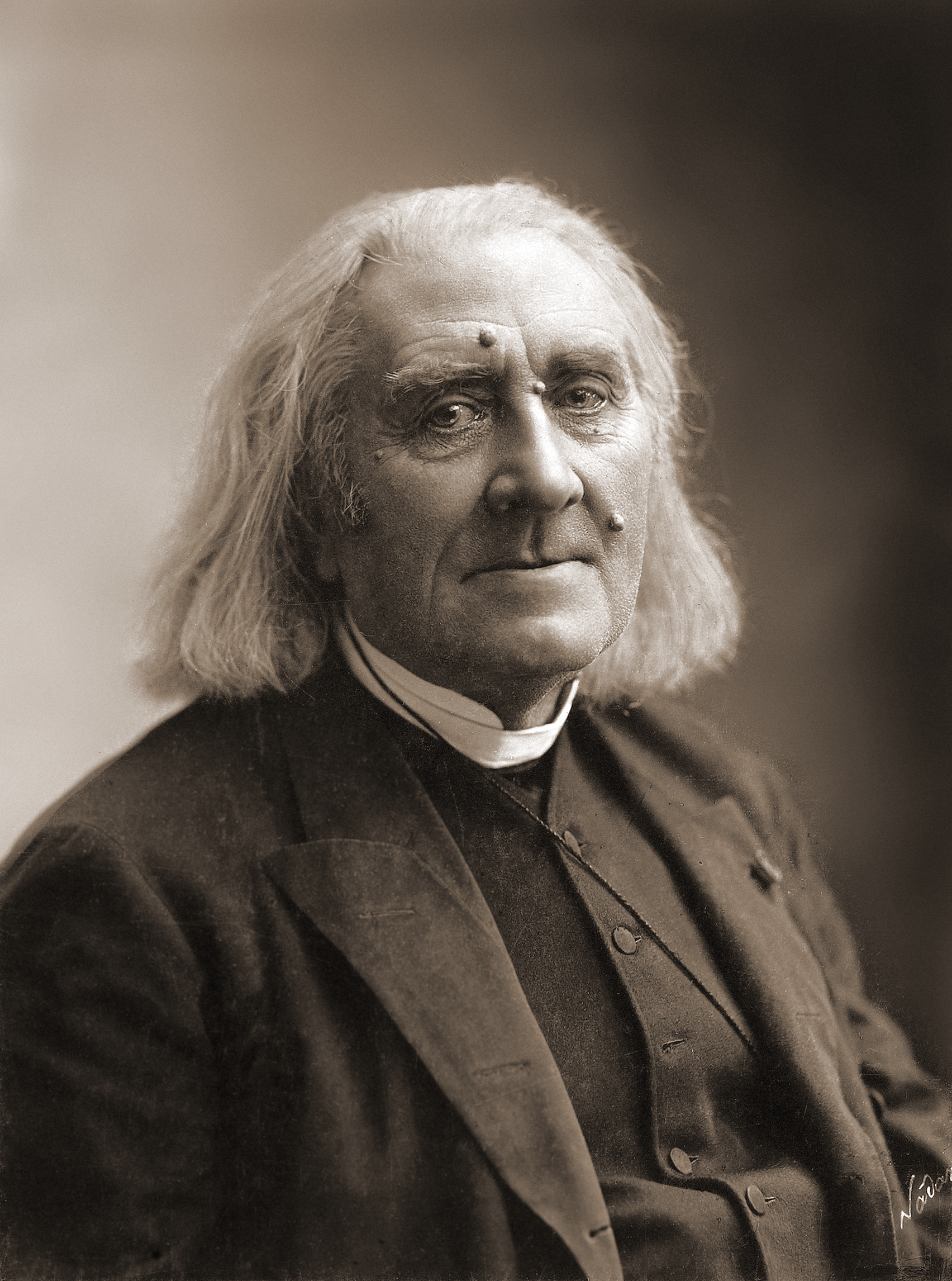
Liszt in March 1886, four months before his death, photographed by Nadar

In May of 1881 celebrations were held in Antwerp to honor Franz Liszt as a composer. The organizers set out to perform as many of his works as possible, culminating in an official signing of the Golden Book of Antwerp by Liszt and the performance of his first piano concerto by Anna Mehlig. The success of this festival inspired the organizers to repeat the event four years later during the world exposition in Antwerp. The main performance was – again – Anna Mehlig with Liszt's piano concerto under the direction of Franz Servais.

Liszt fell down a flight of stairs at the Hofgärtnerei in July 1881, and remained bedridden for several weeks after this accident. He had been in good health up to that point, but a number of ailments subsequently manifested, such as a cataract in the left eye, dental issues and fatigue. Since around 1877 he had become increasingly plagued by feelings of desolation, despair and preoccupation with death—feelings that he expressed in his works from this period. As he told Lina Ramann, "I carry a deep sadness of the heart which must now and then break out in sound."

On 13 January 1886, while Claude Debussy was staying at the Villa Medici in Rome, Liszt met him there with Paul Vidal and Ernest Hébert, director of the French Academy. Liszt played "Au bord d'une source" from Années de pèlerinage, as well as his arrangement of Schubert's Ave Maria for the musicians. Debussy in later years described Liszt's pedalling as "like a form of breathing."

Liszt travelled to Bayreuth in the summer of 1886. This was in order to support his daughter Cosima, who was running the festival but struggling to generate sufficient interest. The festival was dedicated to the works of her husband Richard Wagner, and had opened ten years previously; Wagner had died in 1883. Already frail, in his final week of life Liszt's health deteriorated further, as he experienced a fever, cough and delirium.

He died during the festival, near midnight on 31 July 1886, at the age of 74—officially as a result of pneumonia, which he had contracted prior to arriving in Bayreuth, although the true cause of death may have been a heart attack. He was buried on 3 August 1886, in the Municipal Cemetery of Bayreuth, according to Cosima's wishes; despite controversy over this as his final resting place, Liszt's body was never moved.

== Relationships with other composers ==
=== Hector Berlioz ===
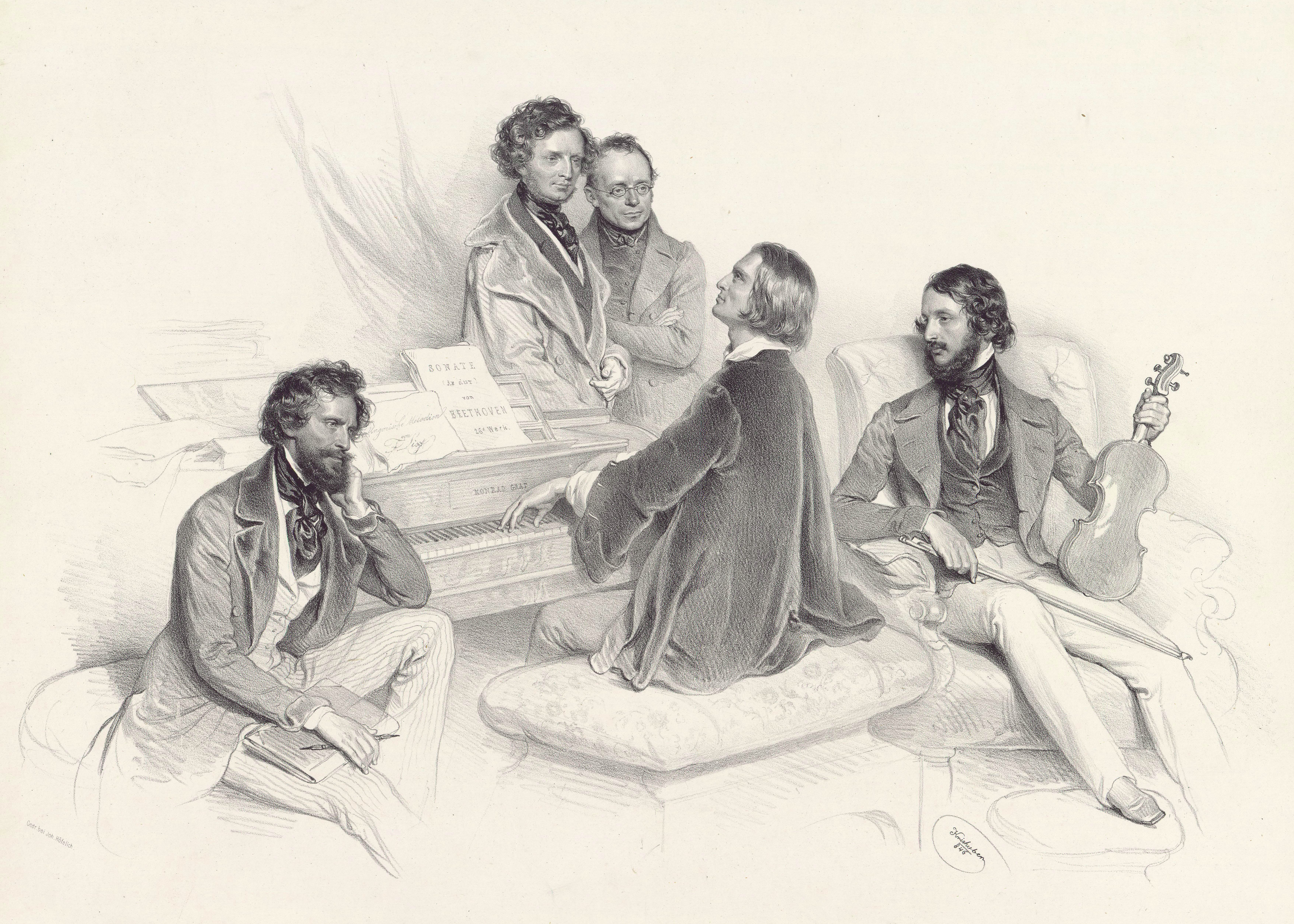
Berlioz (standing, left) listening to Liszt play the piano (1846)

Berlioz and Liszt first met on 4 December 1830, the day before the premiere of Berlioz's Symphonie fantastique. The two quickly became very close friends, exchanging intimate letters on their respective love lives, which also reveal that Liszt was aware of Berlioz's fixation on suicide. Liszt acted as a witness at Berlioz's wedding to Harriet Smithson in 1833, despite cautioning Berlioz against it, and they worked together at several concerts over the following three years, and again in 1841 and 1844. In Weimar, the two composers revised Benvenuto Cellini, and Liszt organised a "Berlioz Week". It included Roméo et Juliette and part of La damnation de Faust, which was later dedicated to Liszt. In return, Liszt dedicated his Faust Symphony to Berlioz.

The orchestration of Berlioz had an influence on Liszt, especially with regards to his symphonic poems. Berlioz saw orchestration as part of the compositional process, rather than a final task to undertake after the music had already been written. Berlioz joined Liszt and Wagner as a figurehead of the New German School, but an unwilling one, as he was unconvinced by Wagner's ideas about the "music of the future".

=== Frédéric Chopin ===
Chopin and Liszt first met in the early 1830s, both moving in the same circles of artists residing in Paris. Liszt attended Chopin's first Paris performance at the Salle Pleyel on 26 February 1832, which he admired greatly, and by mid-1833 the two had become close friends. They performed together a number of times, often for charity, and since Chopin only performed in public about 12 times, these events comprise a large proportion of his total appearances.

Their relationship cooled in the early 1840s, and several reasons have been suggested for this, including that Marie d'Agoult was infatuated with Chopin, or Liszt with Aurore Dupin (also known by her pen name George Sand), or that Liszt used Chopin's home for a rendezvous with Marie Pleyel, the wife of Chopin's friend Camille. The two musicians had very different personalities, with Liszt being extroverted and outgoing while Chopin was more introverted and reflective, so it is possible that the two never had an extremely close friendship to begin with, and the fact that they did not live physically close together would have been another barrier. On the topic, Liszt commented to Chopin's biographer Frederick Niecks that Marie d'Agoult and Aurore Dupin had frequently disagreed, and the musicians had felt obliged to side with their respective partners. Alex Szilasi suggests that Chopin took offence at an equivocal 1841 review by Liszt, and was perhaps jealous of Liszt's popularity, while Liszt in turn may have been jealous of Chopin's reputation as a serious composer.

Very shortly after Chopin's death in 1849, Liszt had a monument erected in his memory and began to write a biography. Chopin's relatives and friends found the timing of this insensitive, and many declined to help with Liszt's enquiries.

Scholars disagree on the extent to which Chopin and Liszt influenced each other's compositions. Charles Rosen identifies similarities between Chopin's Étude Op. 10, No. 9 and the early version of Liszt's Transcendental Étude No. 10, but Alan Walker argues that no such connection exists. Stylistic similarities between other studies, Chopin's Nocturnes and Liszt's Consolations, and even an influence on the ornamentation and fingering of Liszt's works, have been proposed.

=== Robert and Clara Schumann ===
In 1837 Liszt wrote a positive review of Robert Schumann's Impromptus and piano sonatas no. 1 and no. 3. The two began to correspond, and the following year he met Schumann's fiancée Clara Wieck, to whom he dedicated the early version of Grandes études de Paganini. Schumann in turn dedicated Fantasie in C to Liszt. The two met for the first time in Dresden in 1840.

Schumann resigned as editor of the music journal Neue Zeitschrift für Musik in 1844, ten years after founding it. The journal was taken over the following year by Franz Brendel, who used it to publicise and support Liszt's New German School, to Schumann's chagrin. In 1848 Liszt attended a performance of the Piano Trio No. 1 being held in his honour in the Schumanns' home. Liszt arrived two hours late with Wagner (who had not been invited), derided the piece, and spoke ill of the recently deceased Mendelssohn. This upset the Schumanns, and Robert physically assaulted Liszt.

The relationship between Liszt and the couple remained frosty. Liszt dedicated his 1854 piano sonata to Robert, who had by that point been committed to a mental institution in Endenich. Clara asked for Liszt's help that year in finding a performance venue in order to earn an income. Liszt arranged an all-Schumann concert with Clara as the star performer and published an extremely positive review, but Clara did not express any gratitude. In a posthumous edition of Robert's works, Clara changed the dedication of the Fantasie from Liszt to herself. After Liszt's death, she wrote in her diary "He was an eminent keyboard virtuoso but a dangerous example for the young. ... As a composer he was terrible."

=== Richard Wagner ===
Wagner first met Liszt in Paris in 1841, while living in poverty after fleeing Riga to escape creditors. Liszt was at this point a famous pianist, whereas Wagner was unknown; unlike Wagner, Liszt did not remember the meeting. In 1844 Liszt attended a performance of Wagner's first major success, the opera Rienzi, in Dresden. The two met in Berlin at the instigation of Wilhelmine Schröder-Devrient, and Wagner later sent Liszt the scores of Rienzi and Tannhäuser in an attempt to elicit approval. Liszt settled in Weimar in 1848, and the two grew close, Wagner still being located in Dresden. Wagner wrote to Liszt a number of times soliciting financial help.

In 1849 Liszt sheltered Wagner after the latter's involvement in the failed May Uprising in Dresden. Liszt arranged a false passport and lent Wagner money to allow him to escape Germany for Switzerland, and for the next ten years continued to send money and visit, as well as petition officials for a pardon which eventually came in 1860.

To publicise Wagner's music, Liszt staged Tannhäuser in 1849, for the first time outside Dresden, and published two transcriptions from it, writing to Wagner "Once and for all, number me in future among your most zealous and devoted admirers; near or far, count on me and make use of me." In 1850 he arranged the premiere of Lohengrin, which Wagner dedicated to Liszt, and he also mounted performances of Der fliegende Holländer. Liszt had intended to dedicate the 1857 Dante Symphony to Wagner, but upon being told this Wagner replied that, while a fine piece, he would prefer to receive money. Liszt was offended by this comment, and did not publish the dedication.

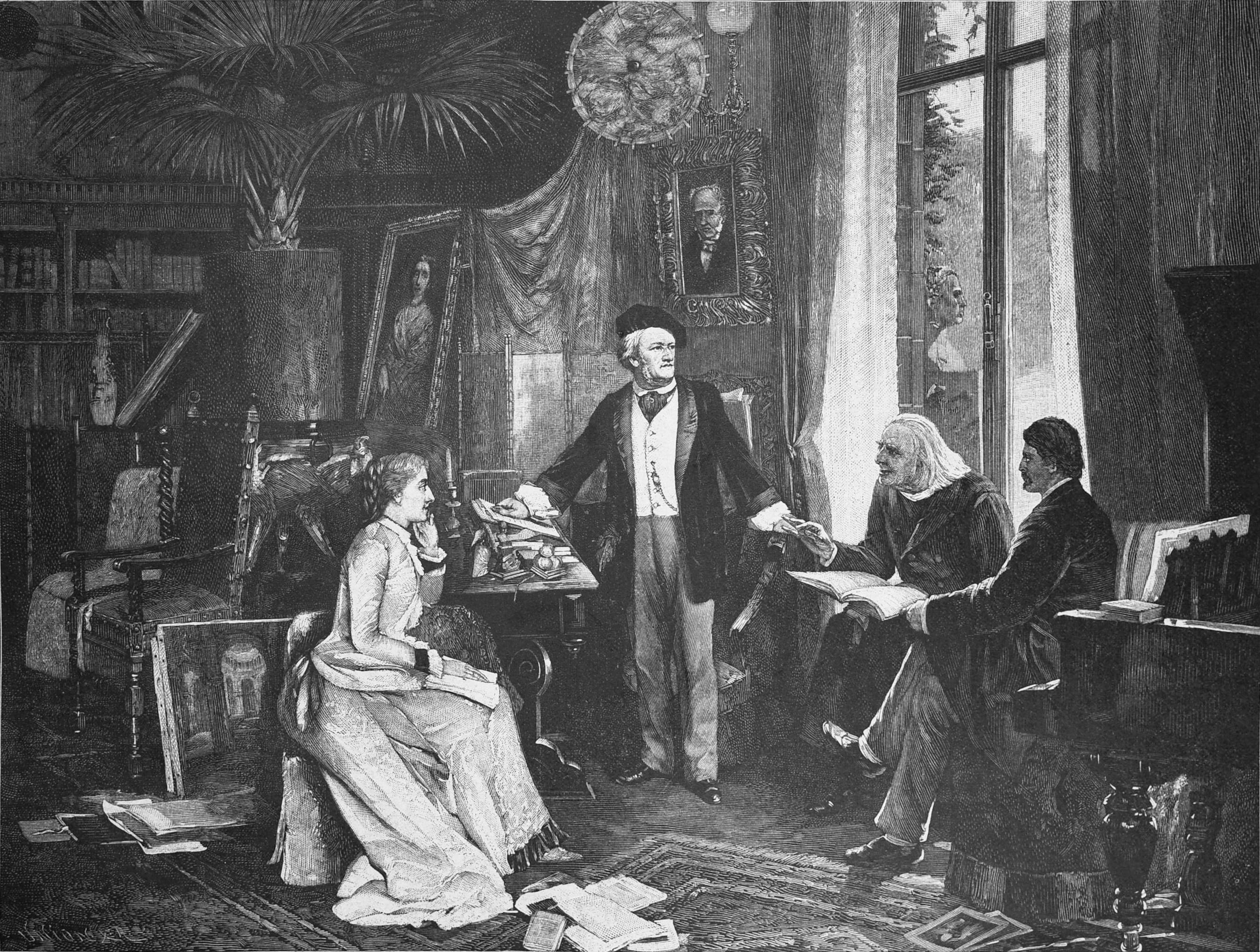
Cosima and Richard Wagner at their home Wahnfried, with Liszt and Hans von Wolzogen (1880)

By 1864 Wagner had begun an affair with Liszt's daughter Cosima, who was married to Liszt's erstwhile pupil Hans von Bülow. Liszt disapproved of the relationship and broke off contact with the couple for a number of years, only learning of their 1870 marriage from the newspapers. Nevertheless, the relationship recovered: Liszt contributed financially to the building of the Bayreuth Festspielhaus in 1871, and he began to correspond with Wagner and Cosima again, frequently visiting their home Wahnfried. Liszt died in 1886 while at the latest incarnation of the Bayreuth Festival, dedicated to Wagner's work, Wagner having died three years previously.

Similarities have been suggested between Wagner's Faust Overture and Liszt's Faust Symphony, but Liszt claimed that the likenesses of the themes were coincidental. Scholars also note a similarity between the opening of Liszt's song "Lorelei" and the famous "Tristan chord" from the opening of Wagner's later opera Tristan und Isolde, although there is no consensus on whether Wagner was influenced by the song. There are similarities in their musical languages, however, and Wagner once even commented to Cosima that he was looking at The Bells of the Strasbourg Cathedral to ensure he had not overtly plagiarised the work, the opening theme of Parsifal being very similar to that cantata. Both composers were also prominent members of the New German School.

== Pianist ==
At his performing peak Liszt was considered the greatest pianist of his time, and was perhaps one of the greatest who ever lived. His popularity during the "Lisztomania" period of the 1840s was unrivalled, and the critic Peter G. Davis has written that "Perhaps [Liszt] was not the most transcendent virtuoso who ever lived, but his audiences thought he was, and no pianist since has seriously challenged the legend."

=== Performing style ===
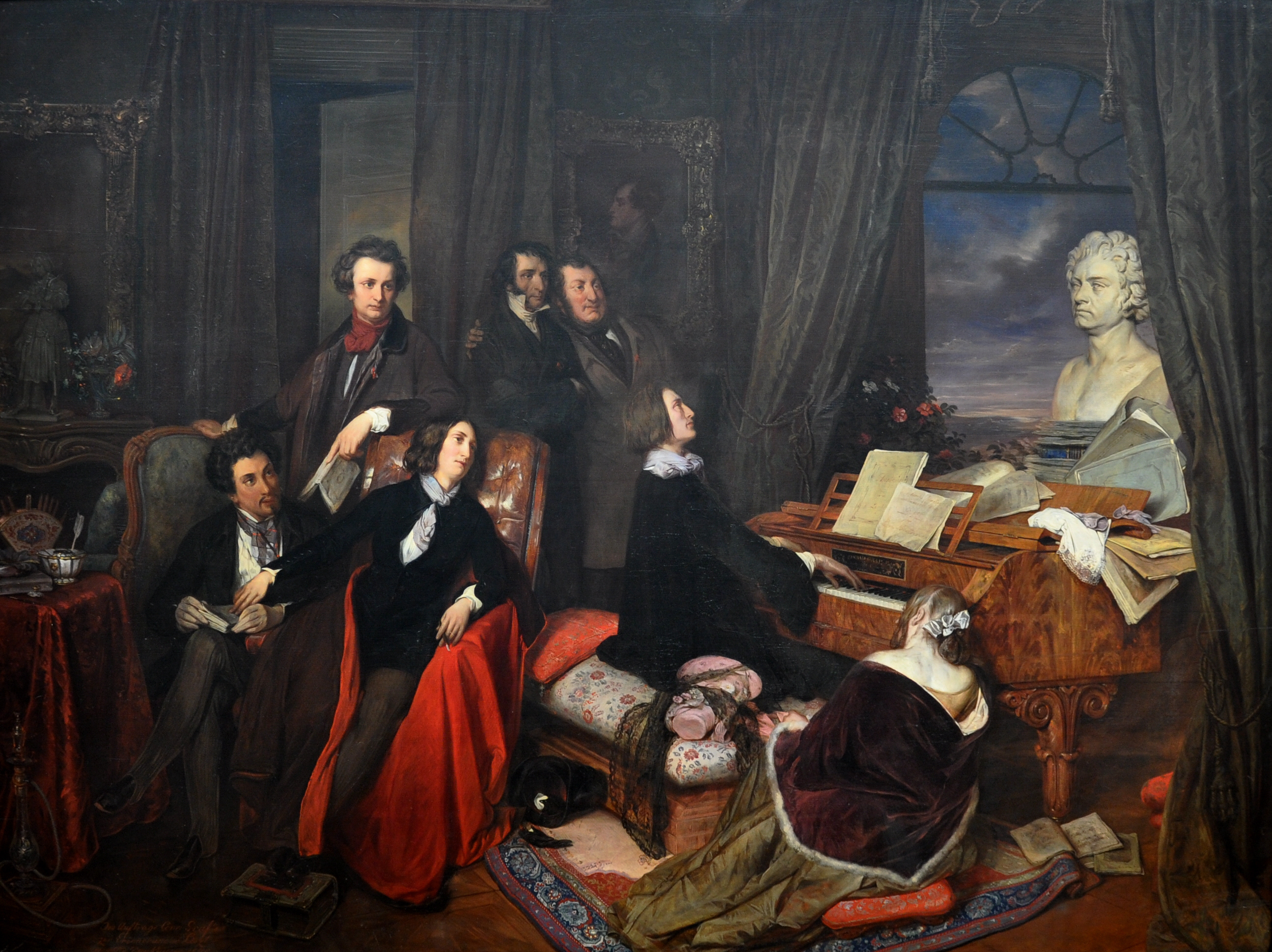
Liszt at the Piano (1840), by Danhauser. The imagined gathering shows seated Alexandre Dumas, George Sand, Liszt, and Marie d'Agoult; standing Victor Hugo, Niccolò Paganini, and Gioachino Rossini; with a bust of Beethoven looking on.

Liszt's performance style changed throughout his life, in his interpretive decisions as well as his physicality (the young Liszt was extremely animated at the keyboard, but in old age he was very still). No known recordings of Liszt exist, so to get an impression of his style scholars must go by contemporary writings and the output of his pupils, while allowing for a certain amount of mythologising around his extraordinary talent.

From a young age Liszt had displayed an aptitude for improvisation and sight reading. Czerny observed that Liszt was a natural who played according to feeling—"one saw that Nature herself had formed a pianist." Liszt's fourteen months under Czerny solidified his technical skills as he enthusiastically studied exercises and works. In later life, however, he would express the opinion that despite his work under Czerny his early training had been unfocused, and he had excelled mainly "by force of personality". Reviews of his early concerts especially praise the brilliance, strength, and precision in his playing. At least one also mentions his ability to keep absolute tempo.

One of the most detailed descriptions of his playing from that time comes from the diary entries of Caroline Boissier-Butini, whose daughter Valerie was a pupil of Liszt's from 1831 to 1832, when he was earning a living primarily as a teacher in Paris:

Boissier records that Liszt did not keep his hands 'in a rounded position' nor were they 'altogether flat', but rather his fingers were 'so flexible as to possess no fixed position'. ... Mme Boissier writes that Liszt's 'hand is never unwieldy, for he moves it with grace according to his fancy', then she stresses that 'he does not play with his arms or shoulders'. In a later lesson, Liszt instructed Valerie to play 'without exception, entirely with a wrist action' ... without any interference by the arm ... Crucially, Liszt emphasised the role of the wrist, not the arm, in producing a full tone for individual notes, and did so not just in relation to octaves or chords.

During his performance career Liszt took unusually bold liberties with the score, changing tempo and adding embellishment at will. In one instance he decided on "a sudden, drastic slowing down" while performing the Scherzo movement of Beethoven's Sixth Symphony. In a regretful letter to George Sand from 1837 Liszt admitted that he made such decisions to gain public acclaim:

[I]n order to wring bravos from the public that is always slow, in its awesome simplicity, to comprehend beautiful things, I had no qualms about changing the tempos of the pieces or the composers' intentions. In my arrogance I even went so far as to add a host of rapid runs and cadenzas, which, by securing ignorant applause for me, sent me off in the wrong direction—one that I fortunately knew enough to abandon quickly. ... Now I no longer divorce a composition from the era in which it was written, and any claim to embellish or modernize the works of earlier periods seems just as absurd for a musician to make as it would be for an architect, for example, to place a Corinthian capital on the columns of an Egyptian temple.

This view on the topic of virtuosity is highlighted in Alan Walker's Liszt biography The Virtuoso Years, citing Liszt's 1840 obituary for Paganini:

May the artist of the future gladly and readily decline to play the conceited and egotistical role which we hope has had in Paganini its last brilliant representative. May he set his goal within, and not outside, himself, and be the means of virtuosity, and not its end. May he constantly keep in mind that, though the saying is "Noblesse oblige!", in a far higher degree than nobility—génie oblige!

Despite his apparent contrition, however, Liszt did continue to make large interpretive changes while performing, although he would be more concerned with fidelity to the score and composer's intentions later in life. He would be more open to pupils revising his own compositions, and he himself often produced different versions of his works over the course of his lifetime. This attitude was in keeping with the shift in audience preferences that began in the 1830s, which started to favour a faithfully rendered memorised performance over the improvisation that Liszt employed in these years.

Certain information about Liszt's style can be inferred from the writings of his many pupils. Musicologist Kenneth Hamilton identifies several themes which occurred through Liszt's teachings, including avoiding excessive sentimentality, imagining the orchestration of the piece, flexibility of tempo, and the importance of a sense of music. Amy Fay studied with Liszt in his later life, 1869–1875, and her writings align with Boissier's four decades earlier. She also notes that Liszt kept his fingers close to the keyboard to achieve a better legato, and that Liszt discouraged unnecessary hand movements, in contrast to his flamboyant gestures during his prime. Notes by his pupil Pauline Fichtener in the 1870s again stress freedom and flexibility of the wrist.

=== Concert repertoire ===
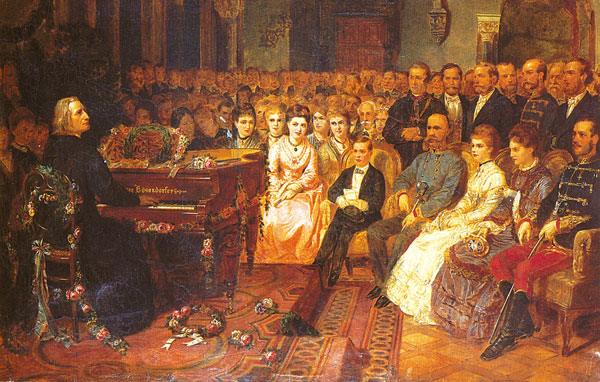
Liszt giving a concert for Emperor Franz Joseph I on a Bösendorfer piano

Up to 1840, most concerts featuring a solo pianist included other acts, such as an orchestra, singers and ballet. The increasing prominence of the solo piano virtuoso in the 1830s led to other acts on the bill being described as "assistant artists", with Liszt declaring his pre-eminence in a letter to a friend dated June 1839: "Le concert, c'est moi". Liszt is credited as the first pianist to give solo recitals in the modern sense of the word; the term was first applied to Liszt's concert at the Hanover Square Rooms in London on 9 June 1840.

During his years as a travelling virtuoso Liszt performed an enormous amount of music, usually from memory. He was the first to include the full range of repertoire, from J. S. Bach to Chopin. His concerts included original compositions such as Grand galop chromatique, Fantaisie romantique sur deux mélodies suisses and Grande Valse di Bravura; and his transcriptions of Schubert's Schwanengesang, Symphonie fantastique by Berlioz and Beethoven's sixth symphony. Liszt would champion Beethoven's work throughout his life, and his concerts helped popularise the Hammerklavier sonata and Diabelli Variations.

=== Instruments ===
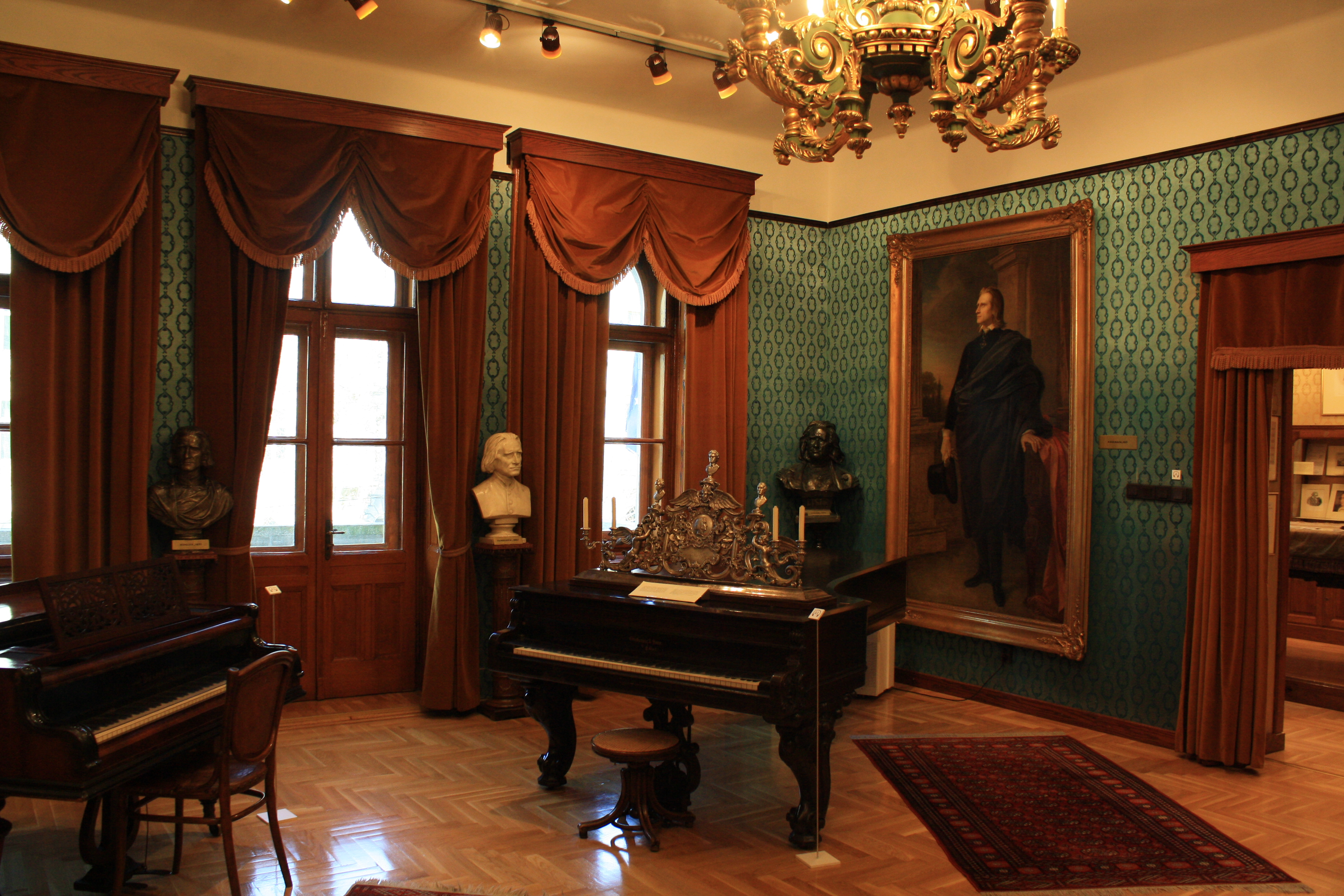
One of Franz Liszt's pianos from his apartment in Budapest

After arriving in Paris in 1823, Sébastien Érard presented Liszt with a grand piano featuring his newly patented double escapement mechanism, a key development in piano technology allowing for faster note repetition. Among the composer's pianos in Weimar were an Érard, a Bechstein, the Beethovens' Broadwood grand and a Boisselot. It is known that Liszt used Boisselot pianos in his Portugal tour and then later in 1847 in a tour to Kiev and Odessa. Liszt kept the piano at his Villa Altenburg residence in Weimar.

The earliest records of Liszt playing the organ date from 1836. He developed an interest in J. S. Bach's organ music in the early 1840s, probably due to Mendelssohn's influence. Later, Liszt commissioned a "piano-organ" from the Paris company Alexandre Père et Fils. The instrument was made in 1854 under Berlioz's supervision, using an 1853 Érard piano, and was a combination of piano and harmonium with three manuals and a pedal board. The company called it a "Liszt piano-harmonium" and installed it in Villa Altenburg in July 1854; the instrument is now exhibited in the Gesellschaft der Musikfreunde collection in Vienna.

Liszt owned two other organs which were installed later in his Budapest residence. The first was a "piano-orgue": this was a smaller version of Weimar's instrument, a combination of a 1864 Érard piano and a harmonium, with two independent manuals, the upper for the piano and lower for the harmonium, built again by Alexandre Père et Fils in 1865. The second was a "cabinet organ", a large concert harmonium built by the American company Mason & Hamlin and given to Liszt in 1877.

== Works ==
Liszt was a prolific composer. He is best known for his piano music, which forms the majority of his oeuvre, but he also wrote for orchestra and for other ensembles. His piano works are often marked by their difficulty. Some of his works are programmatic, based on extra-musical inspirations such as poetry or art. Liszt is credited with the creation of the symphonic poem.

=== Keyboard music ===
==== Piano ====
Hungarian Rhapsody No. 2
Performed by Martha Goldstein on an 1851 Érard piano

La Campanella

The best-known portion of Liszt's music is his original piano work. During the Weimar period he composed the first 15 Hungarian Rhapsodies, themselves revisions of his earlier Magyar Dalok/Rhapsódiák, which were influenced by the Romani bands he heard while visiting Hungary. Harmonies poétiques et religieuses, also the result of a long gestation, was published around the same time, and dedicated to Princess Carolyne. Likewise, the six Grandes Études de Paganini were revised from an earlier 1840 edition and published in 1851; these include the famous piece "La campanella". Other notable pieces include the thoroughly revised collections of Années de pèlerinage ("Years of Pilgrimage"), inspired by his travels around Europe; the Piano Sonata in B minor, which has been described as "one of the most original contributions to sonata form to come out of the 19th century"; and the Transcendental Études, which are stylistically varied, technically difficult, and have been described as "Liszt at his most Lisztian".

==== Organ ====
Liszt wrote his two largest organ works between 1850 and 1855 while he was living in Weimar, a city with a long tradition of organ music, most notably that of J. S. Bach. Humphrey Searle calls these works – the Fantasy and Fugue on the chorale "Ad nos, ad salutarem undam" and the Fantasy and Fugue on the Theme B-A-C-H – Liszt's "only important original organ works"; Derek Watson considered them among the most significant organ works of the nineteenth century, heralding the work of such key organist-musicians as Reger, Franck and Saint-Saëns, among others. Liszt also wrote the monumental set of variations on the first section of the second movement chorus from Bach's cantata Weinen, Klagen, Sorgen, Zagen, BWV 12 (which Bach later reworked as the Crucifixus in the Mass in B minor), which he composed after the death of his daughter in 1862. He also wrote a Requiem for organ solo, intended to be performed liturgically during the service of the spoken Requiem Mass.

==== Transcriptions and paraphrases ====
Totentanz
Totentanz: Paraphrase on Dies irae

Liszt coined the terms "transcription" and "paraphrase" with regards to music, the former being a faithful reproduction of the source material and the latter a more free reinterpretation. He wrote substantial quantities of both over the course of his life, and they form a large proportion of his total output—up to half of his solo piano output from the 1830s and 1840s is transcription and paraphrase, and of his total output only approximately a third is completely original. In the mid-19th century, orchestral performances were much less common than they are today and were not available at all outside major cities; thus, Liszt's transcriptions played a major role in popularising a wide array of music such as Beethoven's symphonies. Liszt's transcriptions of Italian opera, Schubert songs and Beethoven symphonies are also significant indicators of his artistic development, the opera allowing him to improvise in concert and the Schubert and Beethoven influence indicating his compositional development towards the Germanic tradition. He also transcribed his own orchestral and choral music for piano in an attempt to make it better known.

In addition to piano transcriptions, Liszt also transcribed about a dozen works for organ, such as Otto Nicolai's Ecclesiastical Festival Overture on the chorale "Ein feste Burg", Orlando di Lasso's motet Regina coeli and excerpts of Bach's Cantata No. 21 and Wagner's Tannhäuser.

=== Songs ===
Today, Liszt's songs are relatively obscure. There are 137 secular vocal pieces, 82 of which were original songs with piano accompaniment, mostly composed in the 1840s. In most cases the lyrics are in German, but there are also some in Italian and French, three in Hungarian and one in each of Russian and English. The influence of Italian opera can be seen in the songs' use of arioso and recitative styles. While in Weimar Liszt coached the Court Opera singers, and several prominent musicians sang his songs, including Rosa and Hans von Milde.

=== Program music ===
Liszt coined the term "program music" in an 1855 essay on Berlioz's Harold in Italy, referring to pieces which are "driven by an overarching poetic image or narrative" (in the case of Harold in Italy, the piece "describes" the scenes witnessed by the character Harold as he travels through Italy). This is presented in opposition to absolute music, which stands for itself and is intended to be appreciated without any particular reference to the outside world. This was not a new idea – such pieces had been written since the early 18th century, and Liszt himself had written works such as the early version of Années de pèlerinage which invoked his experiences travelling – but he presented the novel argument that program music was artistically superior, counter to the prevailing view that such work was unserious. This developed into the idea that the historical development of music as an art form was destined to move from absolute to representational: Beethoven's symphonies had mostly been non-representational, but his ninth symphony had included some extramusical elements, and Berlioz had taken this further with Harold in Italy and Symphonie fantastique. Wagner saw these developments as a stepping stone to the all-encompassing Gesamtkunstwerk, and in this sense Liszt's programmatic works were part of his vision of the "Music of the Future".

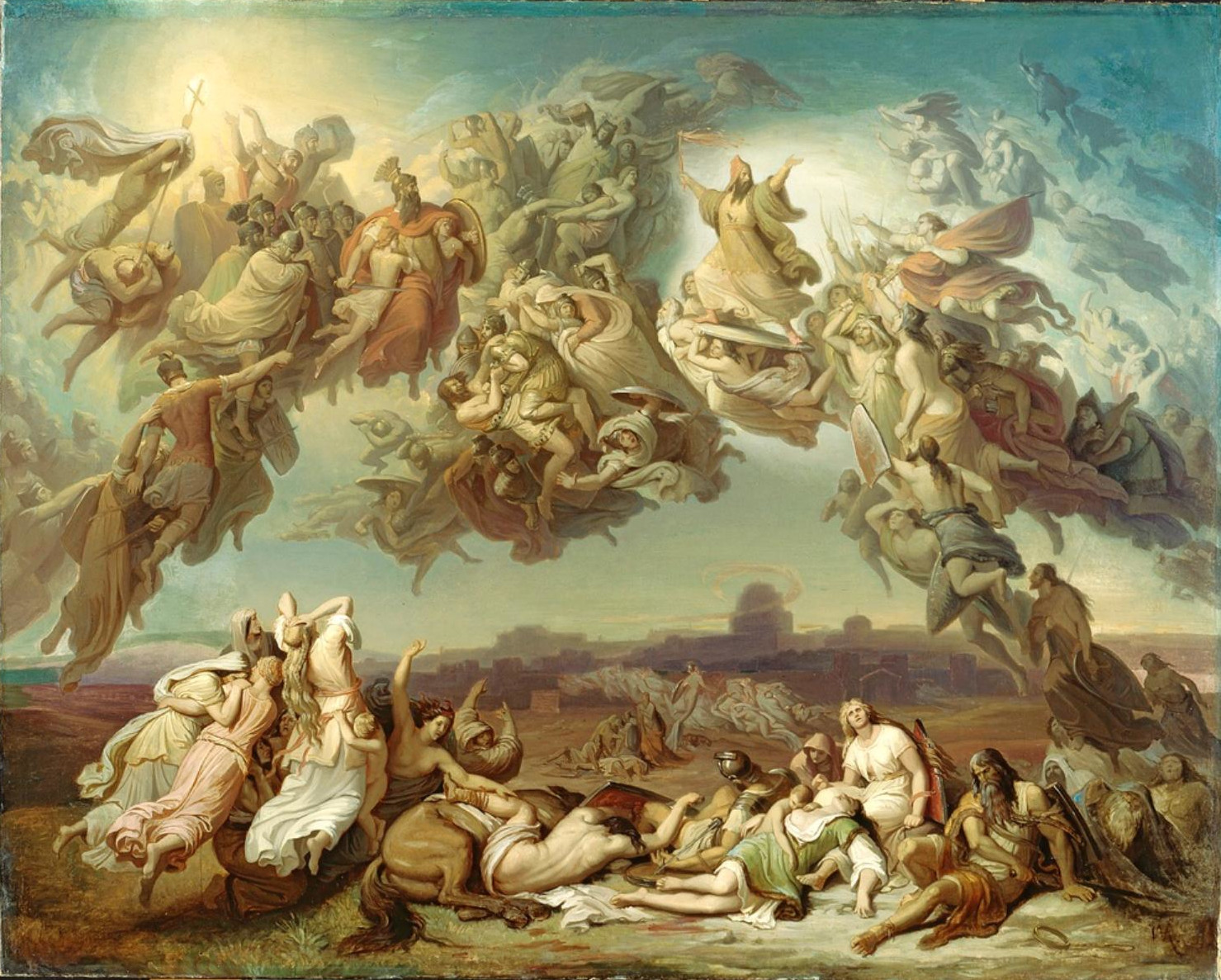
Die Hunnenschlacht, as painted by Wilhelm von Kaulbach, that in turn inspired one of Liszt's symphonic poems

Liszt's main contribution to program music was his thirteen symphonic poems, one-movement orchestral works in which some extramusical program or idea provides a narrative or illustrative element. The first twelve of these were written between 1848 and 1858, and the most well-known are Les préludes and Mazeppa. The symphonic poems were poorly received by critics, especially in Weimar, where Liszt was residing at the time—they criticised Liszt's compositional style as well as the whole idea of program music as the future of music.

Believing in the power of music to transcend people's typical quotidian existence, with his program music Liszt attempted to "elevate listeners to a higher realm of consciousness". He argued that its purpose was less to do with depicting a specific scene or experience, and more about allowing the listener to reach a higher state of existence. Such music would act as a more direct method of communication than language, allowing people to share exactly their own experiences. This view was endorsed by Franz Brendel, Wagner and Friedrich Theodor Vischer.

=== Late works ===
Liszt's final period is considered to have started from about 1869, during which he wrote a number of short and independent works, such as the collection Weihnachtsbaum and a piano version of Via crucis, although he did continue to write transcriptions and paraphrases as well as sacred vocal music. Studies of his output from this period typically focus on pieces which display a willingness to push the boundaries of tonality and have an association with death and mourning, such as La lugubre gondola and Unstern!. The morbid focus on loss may be ascribed to Liszt's mental state in his final decade, when he suffered episodes of depression. Many of these pieces remained unpublished in Liszt's lifetime.

Liszt's experimentation can be seen in his 1881 piece Nuages gris. Its key signature is G minor, but ends in an ambiguous tonality; its texture is generated by a collection of fragments rather than a distinct melody and harmony; and it uses chromaticism and dissonance such as the tritone. Additional examples include Czardas macabre, which repeatedly uses a single melodic motif and rhythm accompanied dissonantly or with open fifths, and "Csárdás obstinée", which makes extensive use of false relations. Some of his sacred vocal music also shows this type of experimentation, such as Via crucis, which contains some movements without key signatures and with ambiguous tonality.

=== Writings ===
Liszt published a number of prose works and letters over the course of his life, including his 1863 Life of Chopin. Many scholars have doubted that he was their sole author, suggesting that the writings ascribed to Liszt were written partly or solely by Countess Marie d'Agoult or Princess Carolyne, but there is no consensus on this matter. It is known that the programs for some of his symphonic poems were ghost-written.

One of Liszt's notable written works was his biography of Chopin, started less than a month after Chopin's funeral. F. Chopin was serialised in the journal La France musicale in 1851 and published in book form the following year, having been edited by Carolyne. The book was poorly received. Liszt had approached Chopin's sister Ludwika and pupil Jane Stirling for information, but they had been uncooperative, finding the timing of his enquiries so soon after Chopin's death to be insensitive. As a result, the work contained several factual inaccuracies. Nevertheless George Sand, who features prominently in one of the chapters, admired the book. English translations garnered attention in the US and UK over the subsequent two decades, leading to a second edition in 1879. Once again Liszt asked Carolyne to help, but her contribution was so extensive that Liszt considered it over-involvement, going so far as to describe the book as having been "written by Carolyne".

One significant essay by Liszt is "De la situation des artistes" ("On the situation of artists"), which was serialised in the Parisian Gazette musicale in 1835. This work calls for the reform of theatres: Liszt perceived the physical buildings to be unsafe and unpleasant, and their managers to be incompetent. He argues that they would book the cheapest variety of acts without concern for artistic merit, leading to subpar concert experiences. Furthermore, owners would blacklist performers who had appeared at a rival venue. Liszt was also concerned about the lack of professionalism of educational institutions, which were run by unqualified teachers and charged high tuition. In his view, their courses lacked rigour, and had an undue preference for older music over that of living composers.

During his Weimar years, Liszt wrote essays for audiences on Harold in Italy, Lohengrin and Alfonso und Estrella. In addition he wrote the book Des Bohémiens et de leur musique en Hongrie (translated as The Gypsy in Music) about the Romani and their influence on Hungarian folk music. This work proved controversial in the country, with Hungarians disputing Liszt's assertion that Romani communities were responsible for a large contribution to the native music. The second edition, published in 1881, contains antisemitic passages included by Princess Carolyne.

Liszt also worked until at least 1885 on a treatise on modern harmony entitled Sketches for a Harmony of the Future. Arthur Friedheim, a pupil of Liszt's at the time, remembered seeing it among Liszt's papers at Weimar. Liszt told Friedheim that the time was not yet ripe to publish the manuscript. This treatise has since been lost.

== Legacy ==
=== Compositions ===
Romantic music generally fell out of favour during the first half of the 20th century, as composers such as Stravinsky, Schoenberg and Bartók took the art form in new directions. Liszt's music seemed "flamboyant and excessive" in contrast with their leaner styles, and his work had neither become part of the established canon nor received credit for being avant-garde. His piano music received attention from few pianists during this period, and only a few select popular pieces such as the Liebesträume and Hungarian Rhapsodies were published in collections. Two notable champions were Ferruccio Busoni, who delivered all-Liszt recitals in Berlin in 1904–1905 and 1911, and Humphrey Searle, who organised concerts of Liszt's chamber and orchestral music in the 1930s and 1940s. Of his orchestral works, only Les préludes and the Faust Symphony were performed regularly.

During the Romantic Revival of the 1950s Liszt's works and writings received greater attention, and scholars now appreciate the wide range and originality of his compositions. In the decades since, recordings of the vast majority of his output have become available, and a complete edition of scores is being published, to modernise the previous such collection published by Breitkopf & Härtel in 1907–1936. Liszt competitions occur across the world, and Liszt societies promote his work.

The great artist's true significance was revealed to me at last. I came to recognize that, for the continued development of musical art, his compositions were more important than either Wagner's or Strauss's.

— Béla Bartók on Liszt

Scholar James Deaville writes that "few composers of the nineteenth century, except possibly Wagner, had the same influence upon succeeding generations as Liszt did. Indeed, one is hard-pressed to think of an innovative composer of the early twentieth century who was not influenced by Liszt's music, especially in its departures from traditional harmonies and novel approaches to form and formal unity". Prokofiev admired Liszt's concertos, which influenced his own, and Stravinsky remarked that he had "admiration for the great Liszt whose immense talent in composition is underrated." Liszt's piano music had a strong influence on the Impressionistic music of Debussy and Ravel; one example is Debussy's L'isle joyeuse, which has clear similarities with Les jeux d'eaux à la villa d'Este, a piece he heard Liszt perform in 1884. Liszt also had a marked influence on early 20th-century Hungarian composers, especially Kodály with his Psalmus Hungaricus, Dohnányi in his second string quartet, and Bartók, who admired Liszt's works greatly. Liszt's method of using Hungarian folk music in his compositions was developed further by these composers and their successors, who integrated such themes more subtly and valued the authenticity of the source material to a greater extent.

It is now held that many of Liszt's late compositions, such as Nuages gris, Les jeux d'eaux à la villa d'Este and Czardas macabre, anticipated future developments. Liszt often used symmetrical pitch collections, which equally divide octaves, such as tritones, whole tone and octatonic scales. These collections, as well as the use of parallel fifths, unresolved dissonances, and parallel diminished and augmented triads, predate similar compositional techniques used by Ravel and Bartók. Liszt helped develop chromatic tonality in many ways. He pioneered a tonal language of building chords in fourths, which was a technique later used by Schoenberg. But, tonality was not the only area that he experimented with, as he was also creative with forms. For example, he combined sonata and four-movement symphonic forms in his Sonata in B Minor. However, many of Liszt's late works were not available until the publication of José Vianna da Motta's final volume of Liszt's solo pieces in 1927, so much of his more radical experimentation cannot have influenced composers before then.

Liszt's invention of the symphonic poem had an impact across Europe from the last years of his life through to the 1920s. His friend Saint-Saëns wrote Le Rouet d'Omphale in 1869 and La jeunesse d'Hercule in 1877; Smetana, another friend, wrote Má vlast in the 1870s. Franck, d'Indy, Dvořák and Debussy all wrote symphonic poems in the 1880s and 1890s. Sibelius was introduced to the music of Liszt through his teacher Martin Wegelius, and the influence of Liszt's symphonic poems is seen in Sibelius' Kullervo and En saga. Richard Strauss also wrote his notable collection of tone poems around this time, and these are similarly indebted to Liszt.

Liszt is also credited with several proto-cinematic innovations which anticipate Wagner's more widely recognised status as the 'father of cinema', such as audio-visual performance practices and cinematic listening.

=== Teaching ===
From 1827 until the last month of his life, Liszt gave lessons in composition and piano playing. He wrote in 1829 that his schedule was "so full of lessons that each day, from half-past eight in the morning till 10 at night, I have scarcely breathing time". Estimates of the total number of pupils he taught range as high as over 400, although some of these may only have had one lesson, or perhaps even none at all.

In Weimar Liszt pioneered the concept of the masterclass, in which he would instruct each pupil in turn while the others observed. Students from this time included Karl Tausig, Hans von Bülow, Karl Klindworth and Hans Bronsart von Schellendorff as well as Sophie Menter, Anna Mehlig, Amy Fay, Adele aus der Ohe, Lina Schmalhausen und Ingeborg von Bonsart. Members of these classes would also accompany Liszt to concerts and other events. In later years some in Weimar would criticise the masterclasses as a vanity club more interested in praising Liszt than in learning pianistic excellence, although Carl Lachmund commented that the success of many of its pupils, such as Arthur Friedheim, Moriz Rosenthal, Frederic Lamond and Alexander Siloti, proved the groups' effectiveness.

One of the sources about Liszt's teaching methods are the letters and the book of Amy Fay, which she wrote and compiled during her years in Germany from 1869 to 1875. In 1873 she observes:

Liszt generally walks about, and smokes, and mutters (he can never be said to talk), and calls upon one or the other of us to play. From time to time he will sit down and play himself where a passage does not suit him, and when he is in good spirits he makes little jests all the time.

Liszt offered his students little technical advice, expecting them to "wash their dirty linen at home", as he phrased it. Instead, he focused on musical interpretation with a combination of anecdote, metaphor, and wit. He advised one student tapping out the opening chords of Beethoven's Waldstein Sonata, "Do not chop beefsteak for us." To another who blurred the rhythm in Liszt's Gnomenreigen: "There you go, mixing salad again." Liszt also wanted to avoid creating carbon copies of himself, believing instead in preserving his pupils' artistic individuality. This was in contrast to his contemporaries, who focused on drilling students in a uniform approach.

The students were expected to follow certain rules of conduct. This included that they could not ask Liszt to play a piece they wanted to hear. They also could not put themselves forward to present a piece they had rehearsed for the meeting. Amy Fay describes the process to her sister in America as follows:

You lay your notes on the table, so he can see that you want to play, and sit down. He takes a turn up and down the room, looks at the music, and if the piece interests him, he will call upon you. We bring the same piece to him but once.

She also reports home that lessons last for around four hours, in which 20 students would assemble to play for Liszt. Additionally a whole array of personalities from the musical world would come in into the room to observe the interaction between Liszt and his students. As Fay describes the situation, it must have been quite a crowd that squeezed itself into the little rooms in Weimar.

Liszt did not charge for lessons. He was troubled when German newspapers revealed that pedagogue Theodor Kullak had earned more than one million marks from teaching: "As an artist, you do not rake in a million marks without performing some sacrifice on the altar of Art". He wrote an open letter to Kullak's sons, published in the Allgemeine musikalische Zeitung, urging them to create an endowment for needy musicians, as Liszt himself frequently did.

Amy Fay who was a student of Tausig, Kullak and Liszt compared Liszts teaching with her previous teacher as:

When I think what a little savage Tausig often was, and how cuttingly sarcastic Kullak could be at times, I am astonished that Liszt so rarely loses his temper.

=== Hungary ===
In 2011, Budapest Ferenc Liszt International Airport officially adopted its name in honour of Liszt.
