= Nuages gris =

Composition for piano by Franz Liszt

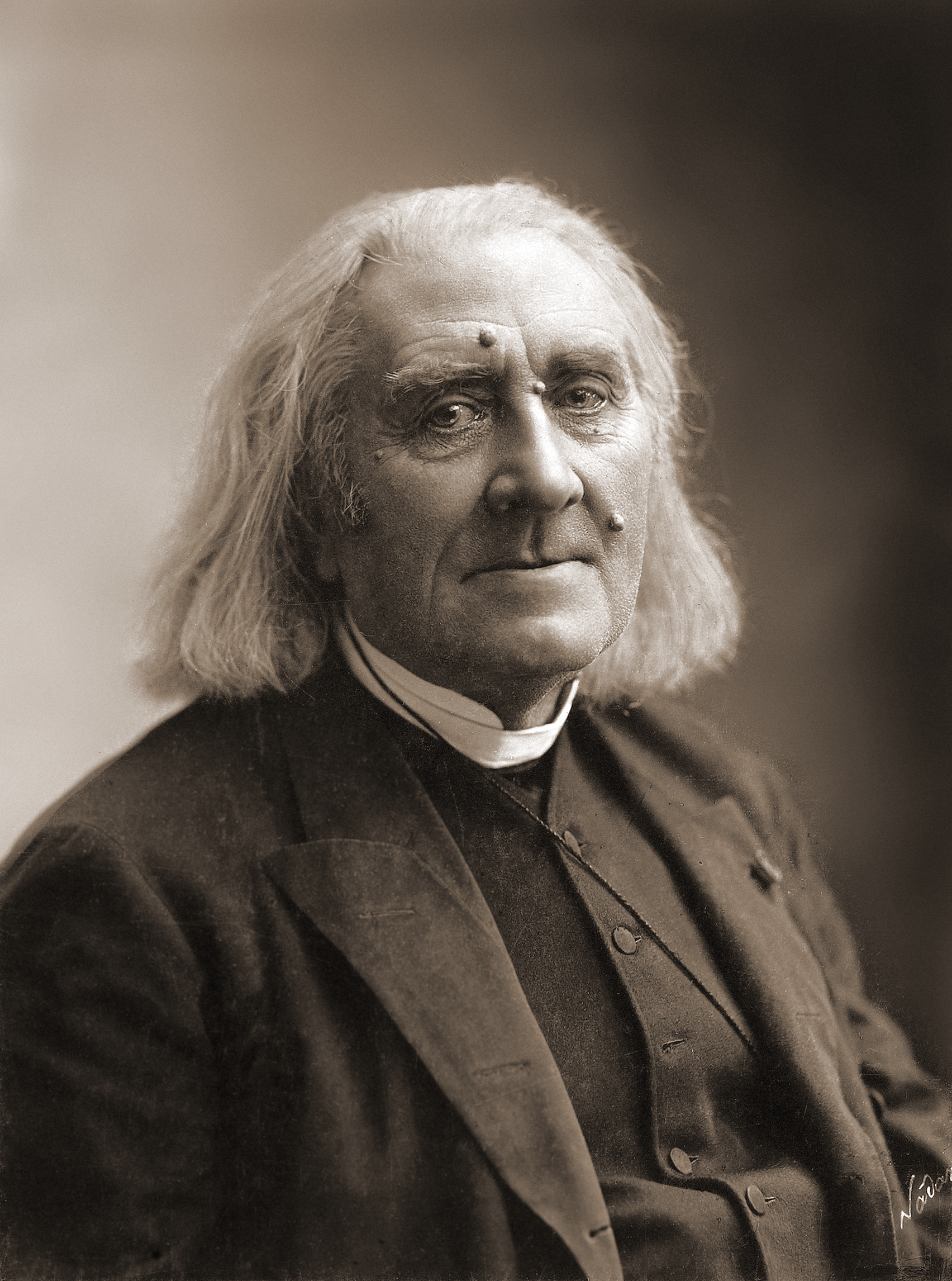
Franz Liszt in March 1886

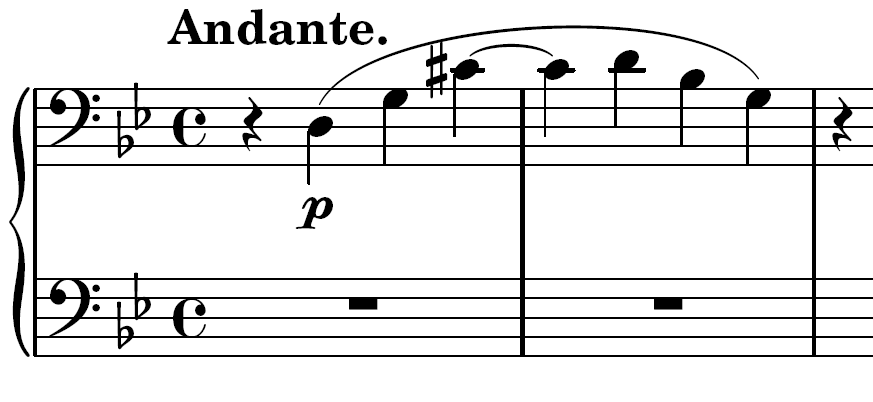
The first two bars present the quartal harmony used in this piece.

Nuages gris (pronounced [nɥaʒ ɡʁi]; French, lit. Grey Clouds), S.199 or Trübe Wolken, is a work for piano solo composed by Franz Liszt on August 24, 1881. It is one of Liszt's most experimental works, representing, according to Allen Forte, "a high point in the experimental idiom with respect to expressive compositional procedure."

== Background ==
Departing from his earlier virtuoso style, Liszt in his later years made several radical, compositional experiments, including Nuages gris, Unstern (S.208) and Bagatelle sans tonalité (S.216). Yet it was only in the second half of the twentieth century that the significance of Liszt's late experimental works began to be appreciated. R. Larry Todd, for example, has noted that "Arguably, Liszt was the first composer to establish the augmented triad as a truly independent sonority, to consider its implications for modern dissonance treatment and to ponder its meaning for the future course of tonality. Liszt's accomplishments in these areas were considerable and support in no small way his position, in Busoni's phrase, as the 'master of freedom.'" Scholars such as Humphrey Searle, Zoltán Harsányi, Bence Szabolcsi, Lajos Bárdos, and István Szelényi have contributed much to placing these works in the repertoire of today's pianists.

Nuages gris is quite short and technically simple. According to Jim Samson, "the most distinctive features of Liszt's late style are present in this short work—the avoidance of a conventional cadential structure, the importance of semitonal movement, the use of the augmented triad as the central harmonic unit and of parallelism as a principal means of progression." The harmonies are based on augmented triads while the melody line makes extensive reference to the Hungarian minor scale. The harmonies, which are very different from those found in his earlier works, give a very dark and almost morbid feel to the piece. Leonard Ratner has commented:

The restless, unresolved dissonances of Nuages gris the isolated figures, the sense of alienation—these have a clear affinity with the somewhat later expressionism of the Viennese composers Mahler and Schoenberg.... [Nuages gris] is a musical bellwether that indicated what was happening and what would happen in European music: sound, with the assistance of symmetry, would take over, harmony would be absorbed into color and lose its cadential function.

Claude Debussy probably had Nuages gris in mind when he composed his own Nuages. Mauricio Kagel used Nuages gris in his Unguis incarnatus est (1972). in 1986, Heinz Holliger worked the piece out into Zwei Liszt-Transkriptionen for orchestra (together with Unstern!). A scene at the morgue in Stanley Kubrick's last film Eyes Wide Shut is accompanied by Nuages gris.
