= The Bells of the Strasbourg Cathedral =

Cantata by Franz Liszt

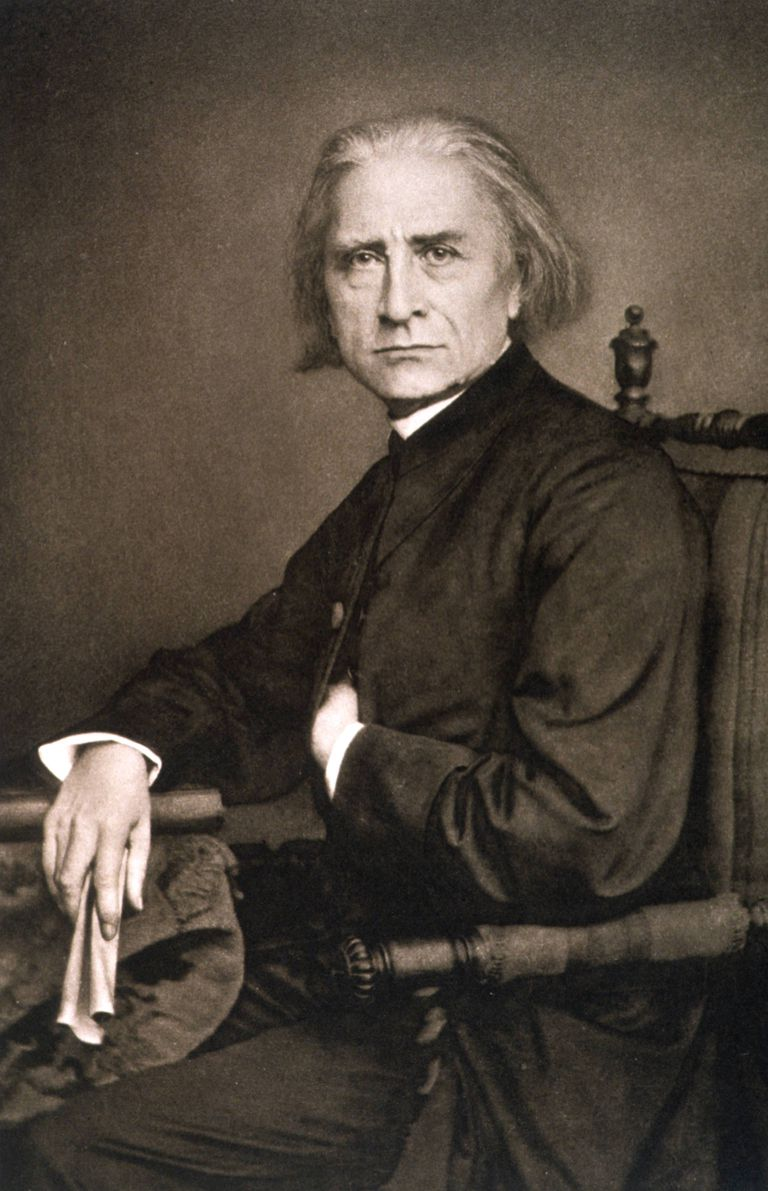
Franz Liszt, photo (mirror-imaged) by Franz Hanfstaengl, June 1870

The Bells of the Strasbourg Cathedral (German: Die Glocken des Strassburger Münsters) S.6, is a cantata composed by Franz Liszt between 1868 and 1874. The lyrics are taken from the prologue of the dramatic poem The Golden Legend (1851) by American poet Henry Wadsworth Longfellow, to whom the composition is dedicated.

The cantata is divided into two sections. The first one, called Preludio (Excelsior), features a mezzo-soprano solo. The second section is called Die Glocken, which refers to the bells of the cathedral. In the second part, a baritone appears as Lucifer talking to the bells (Chorus).

The premiere representation of Die Glocken des Strassburger Münsters was held in Budapest's Vigadó Concert Hall on 10 March 1875.

== Trivia ==
This cantata by Liszt has been played for the first time in its namesake Cathedral only in recent times. Indeed, the historic first representation in the Strasbourg Cathedral has occurred almost 140 years after its composition, when it was performed by the Italian Symphony Orchestra and Chorus Ars Cantus in 2013.
