= Caroline Boissier-Butini =

Swiss pianist and composer

Caroline Boissier-Butini, born Caroline Louise Butini on May 2,1786 in Geneva and died on March 9, 1836 in Pregny-Chambésy, was a Genevan and later Swiss pianist and composer.

== Biography ==
=== Early life ===
Born Caroline Butini in Geneva, she was the eldest child of Pierre Butini (1759–1838) and Jeanne-Pernette, née Bardin (1764–1841). She wrote that her father was her most important patron, though he played no instrument. As a member of the upper class of Geneva, she grew up in a favorable environment for the artistic education of girls, but her immediate family contained no musicians so dedicated as herself. In her writings, the name of a teacher is mentioned only once, in 1808: François-Charles Mansui (1785–1847), a resident of Geneva between 1807 and 1812. Thus, Butini may have had lessons with him as a young adult. It is not known who taught her the basics of playing the piano, which she learned in adolescence. At the age of 20, she noted in her private journal "I have dedicated a third of my life to music."

At 22, she married Auguste Boissier (1784–1856), an amateur violinist. He also supported her musical activities, and she continued to practice intensively after her marriage. The couple had two children: the botanist Edmond Boissier, and Valérie de Gasparin, a noted woman of letters.

During her travels to Paris and London in 1818, she heard some of the foremost pianists of her day, including Johann Baptist Cramer, Marie Bigot de Morogues, Charles Mayer, Henri Bertini, and Frédéric Kalkbrenner. She found her encounters with Cramer and Kalkbrenner in London particularly instructive.

As a pianist, her repertoire included music by the "ancient masters" Scarlatti, Handel, and Bach, then Haydn and Mozart, reaching to the "moderns" of her day including Beethoven, Field, Weber, Meyerbeer, Berlioz und Liszt.

She was well-known in the social and artistic circles of Geneva as both a pianist and a composer. She once noted in her diary: "J'ai un tiers consacré de ma vie à la musique" ("I have a third of my life dedicated to music"; journal no. 3, probably 1806). She died in Prégny, near Geneva, aged 49.

== Selected works ==
Piano and orchestra

- six piano concertos, among which
  - Concerto No. 5, "Irlandais"
  - Concerto No. 6, "Suisse"

Piano solo

- three piano sonatas (published Bern, 2011)
- Caprice et variations sur un air bohémien
- Variations sur l'air "Dormez mes chers amours"
- Caprice sur l'air d'une ballade écossaise
- Variations sur deux airs languedociens
- Fantaisie sur l'air de la belle Rosine
- Polonaise
- 1er Potpourri
- 1ère Sonatine
- Pas russe

Other

- Divertissement, for clarinet, bassoon and piano
- Pièce pour l'orgue ("Piece for Organ")

== Bibliography ==
- Irène Minder-Jeanneret: "Die beste Musikerin der Stadt". Caroline Boissier-Butini (1786–1836) und das Genfer Musikleben zu Beginn des 19. Jahrhunderts (= Osnabrücker Beiträge zur Musik und Musikerziehung vol. 10) (Osnabrück: Epos, 2013); ISBN 978-3-940255-36-5.

== Discography ==
- Piano Concerto No. 6 ("Swiss"); Pièce pour l'orgue; Piano Sonata No. 1; Divertissement; performed by Eva-Maria Zimmermann (piano); Regula Küffer (flute); Nicoleta Paraschivescu (organ); Babette Dorn (piano); Didier Puntos (piano); Michel Westphal (clarinet); Catherine Pépin (bassoon); Berner Kammerorchester, Matthias Kuhn (cond.); on: VDE-Gallo CD-1277.
- Variations sur l'air "Dormez mes chers amours"; performed by Adalberto Maria Riva (piano); on: VDE-Gallo CD-1406.
- Piano Sonata No. 1; Caprice sur l'air d'une ballade écossaise; Sonatine No. 1; Variations sur deux airs languedociens; Piano Sonata No. 2; Caprice et variations sur un air bohémien; performed by Edoardo Torbianelli (piano); on: VDE-Gallo CD-1418.
- Piano Concertos No. 5 ("Irish") and No. 6 ("Swiss"); Divertissement; performed by Adalberto Maria Riva (piano), Sarah van Corneval (flute), Pierre-André Taillard (clarinet), Rogério Gonçalves (bassoon); on: VDE-Gallo CD-1627 (CD, 2020).
