= Alexander Djordjevic =

American classical concert pianist

- Origin: Chicago, Illinois, United States
- Genres: Classical music
- Occupation: Pianist

Alexander Djordjevic (born 1970) is an American classical concert pianist.

== Biography ==
Born in Chicago, Alexander Djordjevic began his piano studies at age three, performing as a concerto soloist at ages twelve and fifteen. As a Fulbright Scholar, Alexander Djordjevic was a student of the Russian pianist and pedagogue Vitaly Margulis at the Hochschule für Musik in Freiburg, Germany where he was awarded the Aufbaustudium Diploma “With Distinction.” He studied piano at the University of Illinois at Urbana-Champaign where he earned his undergraduate and Master's degrees and completed the Doctoral coursework. His teachers have included Gustavo Romero, Joel Shapiro, Vitaly Margulis, William Heiles, Gellert Modos, Sally Bauer, and Ann Schein (Aspen).

== Awards and recognition ==
In addition to being named a Fulbright Scholar, Djordjevic was a prizewinner in numerous piano competitions including First Prize, Grace Welsh Prize for Piano (1991); First Prize, Kankakee Valley Symphony Orchestra's Young Artists Piano Competition (2002); First Prize, Chicago Artists Association Competition (1990); Bradshaw and Buono International Piano Competition (2010); Nena Wideman Piano Competition, Shreveport, Louisiana (1998); and Union League Civic & Arts Foundation Piano Competition, Chicago (1995). He was also selected to participate in the Cleveland International Piano Competition (2001); the Young Concert Artists International Auditions, New York (1990); and the New Orleans International Piano Competition (2002).

In January, 2009, Alexander Djordjevic released his latest CD, Gray Clouds: Piano Music of Franz Liszt, which is composed entirely of the late works of Franz Liszt (see also List of compositions by Franz Liszt (S.1 – S.350)).

Gray Clouds: Piano Music of Franz Liszt is the 2010 recipient of the Hungarian Liszt Society's 35th Annual Franz Liszt International Grand Prix du Disque. Alexander Djordjevic follows an esteemed list of notable pianists who have received this honor for their Liszt recordings including Claudio Arrau, Lazar Berman, Jorge Bolet, Alfred Brendel, György Cziffra, Leslie Howard, Vladimir Horowitz, Jenõ Jandó, Zoltán Kocsis, Maurizio Pollini, and André Watts. According to the Jury of the 35th Annual Liszt Ferenc International Grand Prix du Disque, Hungarian Liszt Society (2010), "[Alexander Djordjevic] ... has the key to the peculiar and meditative world of the works from Liszt's late years. Djordjevic simply plays the sixteen pieces of different length without any kind of mannerism and with a poetic approach, finding the character and appeal of each piece."

Gramophone Magazine writes, "Djordjevic brings great subtlety to this well programmed Liszt Disc.” It goes on to write, “… Djordjevic's mastery and commitment are never in doubt. Listen to the first Elegie's carefully gauged climaxes, the subtle gradations in tone that help flesh out Nuages gris' sparse textures, the warm legato that embraces Romance oubliée's soft chords, or how the pianist imbues the Bagatelle ohne Tonart's [ Bagatelle sans tonalité ] grace notes with a convincing jazzy flair.”

Phoenix Classical writes, "As with any Liszt works, these shorter pieces require a pianist of utmost skill and artistry, and Alexander Djordjevic brings formidable talent and technique to these works, coupled with a profound poetic sensitivity to the music. Gray Clouds features a number of Liszt’s sacred works for solo piano – the “Stabat Mater”, “Vexilla Regis Prodeunt” & “Sancta Dorothea” are among those on this collection, and Djordjevic gives each of these works a stately, yet reflective tone, bringing out their grasping for the divine, while works such as the well-known “En Rêve Nocturne” exude the spirit of Romanticism, and the incredibly original “Bagatelle sans tonalité” points towards the 20th century. Through all of these works, Djordjevic displays a deep affinity for Liszt’s music, showcasing by turns their profundity, their thoughtfulness and their joy, and in every case transcending any limitations of technique."

== Music career ==
Alexander Djordjevic has performed as concerto soloist with the Central Oregon Symphony, New Philharmonic, Symphony of Oak Park River Forest, DuPage Symphony, Kankakee Valley Symphony, and Danville Symphony. Mr. Djordjevic's solo recital performances have included the Academy of Arts, Belgrade, Yugoslavia; The Phillips Collection, Washington, DC; the Dame Myra Hess Memorial Concerts, Chicago, Illinois; PianoForte Foundation Chicago including Schubertiade Chicago; the Harold Washington Library, Chicago, Illinois; the Steinway Society Recital Series; the 19th Century Club; the Kosciuszko Foundation Auditorium, New York; the Old Liszt Academy of Music, Budapest, Hungary; and various performances in Germany. Djordjevic has performed duo-piano recitals with Dr. Daniel Paul Horn, Dr. Mayumi Kikuchi, and Brenda Huang at various venues including PianoForte Foundation Chicago, Nichols Concert Hall, Wheaton College, University of Illinois at Urbana-Champaign, University of Louisville, Middle Tennessee State University, and University of Akron.

Djordjevic's performances have been broadcast live on various radio stations including WFMT (Chicago) and WCLV (Cleveland), and his latest CD, Gray Clouds: Piano Music of Franz Liszt, has already been played on over 30 classical radio stations throughout the United States and Canada.

Mr. Djordjevic is currently on the piano faculty at the Music Institute of Chicago and College of DuPage.

== Discography ==
- Gray Clouds: Piano Music of Franz Liszt (2009)
- 2010 Winner, Hungarian Liszt Society 35th Annual Franz Liszt International Grand Prix du Disque.
- Alexander Djordjevic Plays Scarlatti – Beethoven – Chopin – Rachmaninov – Liebermann (2000)
