= Musical works of Franz Liszt =

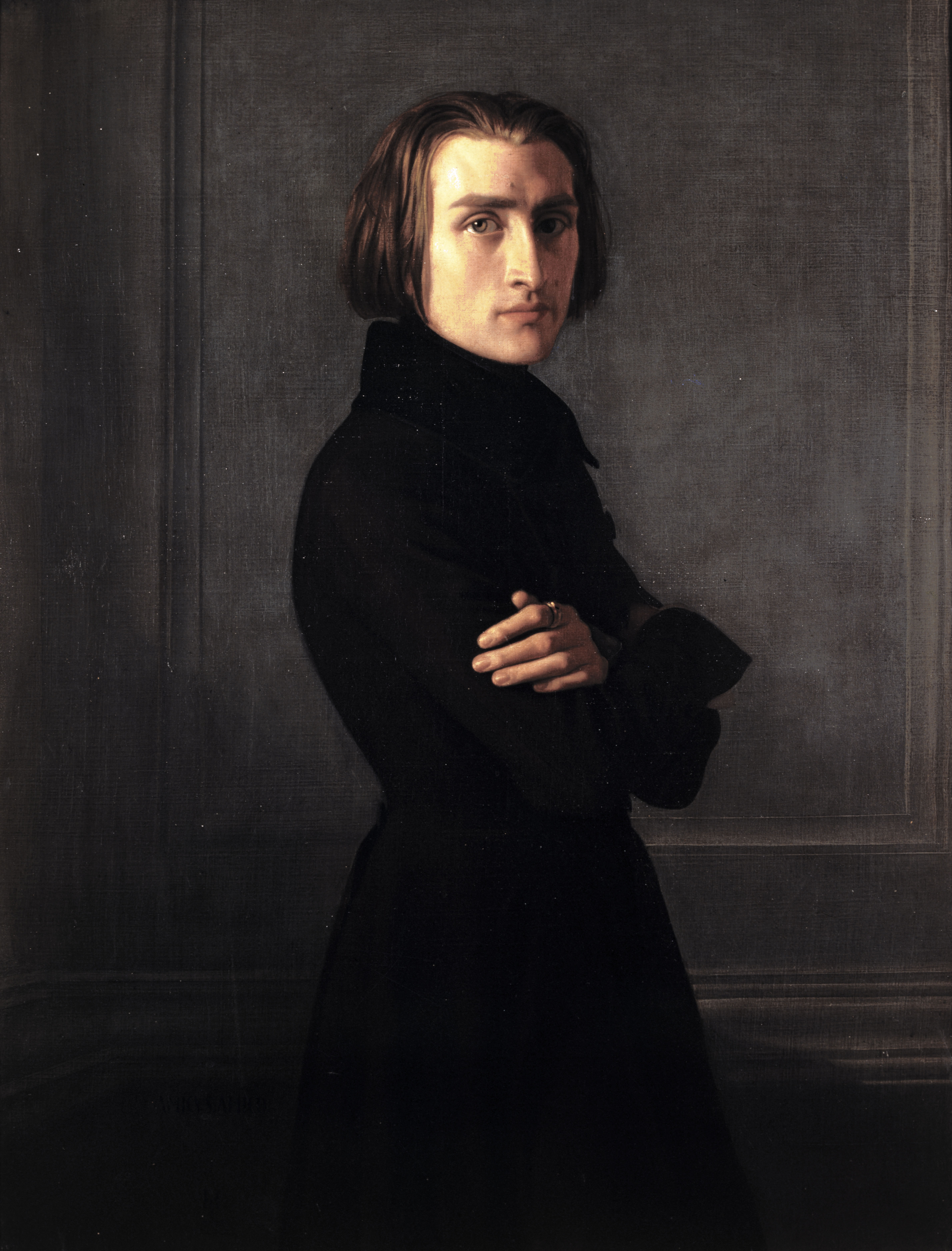
Portrait of Franz Liszt, Henri Lehmann (1839)

Although Franz Liszt provided opus numbers for some of his earlier works, they are rarely used today. Instead, his works are usually identified using one of two different cataloging schemes:

- More commonly used in English speaking countries are the "S" or "S/G" numbers (Searle/Grove), derived from the catalogue compiled by Humphrey Searle for Grove Dictionary in the 1960s.
- Less commonly used is the "R" number, which derives from Peter Raabe's 1931 catalogue Franz Liszt: Leben und Schaffen.

Liszt was a prolific composer. Most of his music is for the piano and much of it requires formidable technique. His thoroughly revised masterwork, Années de pèlerinage ("Years of Pilgrimage") includes arguably his most provocative and stirring pieces. This set of three suites ranges from the pure virtuosity of the Suisse Orage (Storm) to the subtle and imaginative visualizations of artworks by Michelangelo and Raphael in the second set. Années contains some pieces which are loose transcriptions of Liszt's own earlier compositions; the first "year" recreates his early pieces of Album d'un voyageur, while the second book includes a resetting of his own song transcriptions once separately published as Tre sonetti di Petrarca ("Three sonnets of Petrarch"). The relative obscurity of the vast majority of his works may be explained by the immense number of pieces he composed. In his most famous and virtuosic works, he is the archetypal Romantic composer. Liszt pioneered the technique of thematic transformation, a method of development which was related to both the existing variation technique and to the new use of the Leitmotif by Richard Wagner.

== Transcriptions ==
Liszt's piano works are usually divided into two classes. On the one hand, there are original works, and on the other hand there are transcriptions, arrangements, paraphrases or fantasies of works by other composers. Examples of the first class are Harmonies poétiques et religieuses of May 1833 and the Piano Sonata B minor. Examples of the second class are Liszt's transcriptions of Schubert songs, his fantasies on operatic melodies, and his piano arrangements of symphonies by Berlioz and Beethoven. As a special case, Liszt also made piano arrangements of his own instrumental and vocal works. Examples of this kind are the arrangement of the second movement "Gretchen" of his Faust Symphony and the first "Mephisto Waltz" as well as the "Liebesträume" and the two volumes of his "Buch der Lieder".

Liszt's composing of music from existing music, being taken as such, was nothing new. For several centuries many of the most prominent composers, among them J. S. Bach, Mozart and Beethoven, had done it before him. An example from Liszt's time is Schumann. He composed his Paganini Studies, Opp. 3 and 10. The subject of his Impromptus, Op. 5, is a melody by Clara Wieck, and that of the Études symphoniques, Op. 13, is a melody by the father of Ernestine von Fricken, Schumann's first fiancée. The slow movements of Schumann's piano sonatas Opp. 11 and 22 are paraphrases of own early songs. For the finale of his Op. 22 sonata, Schumann took melodies by Clara Wieck again. His last compositions, written at the sanatorium at Endenich, were piano accompaniments for violin Caprices by Paganini.

Although Liszt's arrangements had precedents, he was still subject to criticism. A review in the Leipziger Allgemeine musikalische Zeitung of Liszt's concerts in St. Petersburg in spring of 1843 may be taken as a characteristic example. After Liszt had in highest terms been praised regarding the impression he had made when playing his fantasies, it was to be read:

To an artist of such talents we must put the claims, being with right enforced on him by the world, at a higher level than that which until now has been reached by him – why is he only moving in properties of others? why does he not give creations of himself, more lasting than those fugitive reminiscences of a prevailing taste are and can be? [...] An artist of that greatness must not pay homage to the prevailing taste of a time, but stand above it!!

Also Liszt's mistresses Marie d'Agoult and Princess Wittgenstein wished him to be a "proper" composer with an œuvre of original pieces. Liszt himself, as it seems, shared their opinion. For many times he assured, his fantasies and transcriptions were only worthless trash. He would as soon as possible start composing his true masterworks. While he actually composed such works, his symphonies after Dante and Faust as well as his Piano Sonata are examples for it, he kept making fantasies and transcriptions until the end of his life.

There is no doubt that it was an easier task for Liszt to make fantasies and transcriptions than composing large scale original works. It was this reason for which Princess Wittgenstein frequently called him "fainéant" ("lazy-bones"). But, nevertheless, Liszt invested a particular kind of creativity. Instead of just overtaking original melodies and harmonies, he ameliorated them. In case of his fantasies and transcriptions in Italian style, there was a problem which was by Wagner addressed as "Klappern im Geschirr der Perioden". Composers such as Bellini and Donizetti knew that certain forms, usually periods of eight measures, were to be filled with music. Occasionally, while the first half of a period was composed with inspiration, the second half was added with mechanical routine. Liszt corrected this by modifying the melody, the bass and – in cases – the harmonies.

Many of Liszt's results were remarkable. The Sonnambula-fantasy for example, a concert piece full of charming melodies, could certainly not have been composed either by Bellini or by Liszt alone. Outstanding examples are also the Rigoletto-Paraphrase and the Faust-Waltz. The most delicate harmonies in parts of those pieces were not invented by Verdi and Gounod, but by Liszt. Hans von Bülow admitted that Liszt's transcription of his Dante Sonnet "Tanto gentile" was much more refined than the original he himself had composed.

Notwithstanding such qualities, during the first half of the 20th century nearly all of Liszt's fantasies and transcriptions disappeared from the usually played repertoire. Some hints for an explanation can be found in Béla Bartók's essay "Die Musik Liszts und das Publikum von heute" of 1911. Bartók started with the statement, it was most astonishing that a considerable, not to say an overwhelming part of the musicians of his time could not make friends with Liszt's music. While nearly nobody dared to put critical words against Wagner or Brahms, it was common use to call Liszt's works trivial and boring. Searching for possible reasons, Bartók wrote:

During his youth he [Liszt] imitated the bad habits of the musical dandies of that time – he "rewrote and ameliorated", turned masterworks, which even a Franz Liszt was not allowed to touch, into compositions for the purpose of showing brilliance. He let himself getting influenced by the more vulgar melodic style of Berlioz, by the sentimentalism of Chopin, and even more by the conventional patterns of the Italian style. Traces of those patterns come to light everywhere in his works, and it is exactly this which gives a colouring of the trivial to them.

Following Bartók's lines, in Liszt's Piano Sonata the "Andante sostenuto" in F♯ minor was "of course" banal, the second subject "Cantando espressivo" in D major was sentimentalism, and the "Grandioso" theme was empty pomp. Liszt's Piano Concerto No. 1 in E♭ major was in most parts only empty brilliance and in other parts salon music. The Hungarian Rhapsodies were to be rejected because of the triviality of their melodies.

It is obvious that Bartók himself did not like much of Liszt's piano works. Taking his point of view, the agreeable part was very small. All fantasies and transcriptions on Italian subjects were, of course, to be neglected. But traces of conventional patterns of the Italian style can also be found in works by Mozart, Beethoven and Schubert, as treated by Liszt. Examples are Mozart's opera Don Giovanni and songs like Beethoven's "Adelaïde" and Schubert's "Ave Maria". Liszt's works on French subjects, among them his fantasies on Meyerbeer's operas, were to be suspected to be as vulgar as the style of Berlioz. Everything reminding of Chopin's sentimentalism was as well to be put aside. After this, of Liszt's huge transcriptions oeuvre not much more remained than his arrangements of Beethoven's symphonies, his transcriptions of organ works by Bach, and a selection of his Wagner transcriptions.

As characteristic for tendencies of the early 20th century, there were not only stylistic objections against Liszt's fantasies and transcriptions. Fantasies and transcriptions were in general considered as worthless and not suiting for a "severe" concert repertoire. An example which shows it is the edition of the Elsa-Reger-Stiftung" of Max Reger's "complete" piano works. All of Reger's transcriptions of songs by Brahms, Wolf, Richard Strauss and others as well as his arrangements of Bach's organ works were excluded. Liszt's posthumous fate was of similar kind. In 1911, when Bartók wrote his essay, a complete edition of the "Franz Liszt Stiftung" was in print. Of the series projected to include Liszt's fantasies and transcriptions only three volumes were published. They were a first volume with his Wagner transcriptions, and two further volumes with his arrangements of Beethoven's symphonies. All the rest of Liszt's piano works on works by other composers, i.e. several hundreds of pieces, were excluded.

== Original songs ==
Franz Liszt composed about six dozen original songs with piano accompaniment. In most cases the lyrics were in German or French, but there are also some songs in Italian and in Hungarian. A single song, "Go not, happy day" after Alfred Tennyson, is in English. In several cases, Liszt took lyrics which were also set to music by Schumann. Examples are the songs "Am Rhein, im schönen Strome", "Morgens steh ich auf und frage", "Anfangs wollt' ich fast verzagen" and "Über allen Wipfeln ist Ruh'".

In 1839 in Italy, Liszt composed the song "Angiolin dal biondo crin". The lyrics were taken from an Italian poem by Marchese Cesare Bocella who had become a close friend of Liszt and Marie d'Agoult. With that "Little angel with blond hair", Liszt's daughter Blandine was meant. The child had hummed a simple melody of which Liszt made the song. In 1841 he started composing additional songs. His first ones were "Die Lorelei" after Heine, composed on November 20, 1841 in Cassel, and "Oh! quand je dors" ("Oh! when I'm dreaming") after Victor Hugo, composed at end of December 1841 in Berlin. Both songs were composed for Marie d'Agoult.

By 1844 Liszt had composed about two dozen songs. Some of them had been published as single pieces. In addition, there was a series "Buch der Lieder" which had been projected for three volumes, consisting of six songs each. The first two volumes were published in 1843. In 1844 a third volume appeared, but this volume's title was only "6 Lieder". Liszt also made piano transcriptions of the first two volumes. While the transcriptions of the first volume were published 1846, Liszt did not publish the transcriptions of the second volume.

The songs in the first volume of the "Buch der Lieder" were "Die Lorelei", "Am Rhein im schönen Strome", "Mignons Lied", "Der König von Thule", "Der du von dem Himmel bist", and "Angiolin dal biondo crin". The lyrics of the first two songs were by Heine, those of the following three songs by Goethe. The second volume contained songs with lyrics by Hugo. They were "Oh! quand je dors", "Comment, disaient-ils", "Enfant, si j'etais roi", "S'il est un charmant gazon", "La tombe et la rose", and "Gastibelza", a Bolero.

The third volume should have included the song "O lieb so lang du lieben kannst", of which Liszt's piano transcription is famous and well known as the third "Liebestraum". But Liszt had to change his plan. Since in the beginning of 1844, when the volume was printed, he could not find the manuscript and did not like writing down the song again, he took "Morgens steh' ich auf und frage" instead. The printed volume contained the songs "Du bist wie eine Blume", "Dichter, was Liebe sei", "Vergiftet sind meine Lieder", "Morgens steh' ich auf und frage", "Die todte Nachtigall", and "Mild wie ein Lufthauch im Mai". The volume was dedicated to the Princess of Prussia whom Liszt visited in March 1844 in Berlin for the purpose of giving a copy to her. The lyrics of "Dichter, was Liebe sei" were by Charlotte von Hagn who also lived in Berlin.

Although Liszt's early songs are seldom sung, they show him in much better light than works such as the paraphrase "Gaudeamus igitur" and the Galop after Bulhakow, both composed in 1843. The transcriptions of the two volumes of the "Buch der Lieder" can be counted among Liszt's finest piano works. However, the contemporaries had much to criticize with regard of the style of the songs. Further critical remarks can be found in Peter Raabe's Liszts Schaffen.

Liszt's contemporary critics measured his songs with expectations derived from Lieder by Schubert and other German masters. According to this, a Lied should have a melody which for itself was expressing a single mood and could be sung without much effort. The harmonies, supporting that mood, should be comparatively simple, without strong modulations. It was also presumed, that the piano accompaniment was easy to play. Since Liszt had in many cases offended against those rules, he was accused of never having had a proper grasp of the German Lied. While all this might have been true, it is obvious that Liszt had by no means tried to write German Lieder, sounding like those by Schubert. His "Oh! quand je dors", for example, has French lyrics and music in Italian style.

Raabe tried to show that – in cases – Liszt's declamation of the German lyrics was wrong. "Mignons Lied", for example, was composed in 4/4 time. Of the words "Kennst du das Land", "du" was put on a first, and "Land" on a third beat. Raabe imagined this as if only "du" was stressed while "Land" was not stressed. Of the next verse "wo die Zitronen blühn", "die" was put on a first, and the second syllable of "Zitronen" on a third beat. It could be imagined as if "die" was stressed, and the second syllable of "Zitronen" was not stressed. Singing it this way would indeed sound strange, not to say ridiculous. But Raabe forgot that 4/4 time was by nearly all composers treated as compound time, consisting of two equivalent halves. There are examples where the stress on the third beat equals the stress on the first beat or is even stronger. An example of this kind is Schubert's Lied "Das Wirtshaus" of his cycle "Die Winterreise". More examples can be found in further works by Schubert as well as in works by Bach, Haydn, Mozart, Beethoven, Schumann, Brahms, Wolff, Strauss, Reger and others.

Also, Liszt had occasionally treated his lyrics with some freedom, especially by adding repetitions of important words. In "Der du von dem Himmel bist", for example, he had changed Goethe's "Süßer Friede, komm, ach komm in meine Brust" into "Süßer Friede, süßer Friede, komm, ach komm in meine Brust". While Raabe criticized this as unforgivable sin, he would have better taken a careful look at Lieder by German masters such as Schubert and Schumann who both had treated their lyrics with freedom of similar kinds.

Liszt had good reasons for resisting his critics. But a letter to Joseph Dessauer of the 1850s shows that – until then – he himself had taken a critical point of view. Dessauer had sent own new songs with dedication to Liszt. After Liszt had praised the songs, he wrote:

My own early songs are mostly too swelled out sentimental and frequently too much crammed in the accompaniment.

As consequence, during the Weimar years Liszt not only revised most of his early songs, but rewrote them, giving a much more unpretentious style to them. He also composed additional new songs. The new versions of the early songs as well as some of the additional songs were at end of 1860 published in seven books as "Gesammelte Lieder".

In letters of 1860 Liszt told, some of his songs had at occasions been sung. Since they had been considered as posthumous works by Schubert, they had been applauded and encored. However, with few exceptions, Liszt's songs were never genuine successes. The following remarks of spring 1879 by Eduard Hanslick are of a comparatively friendly kind. After Hanslick had reviewed a performance of Liszt's "Gran Mass", he continued:

Also at the last Philharmonic Concert the liveliest interest was that in Liszt: since Pauline Lucca – obviously in honour of the present composer – sang two songs by Liszt: "Mignon" and "Loreley". Of all of Liszt's compositions, his songs – there are half a hundred of them – are the least known and sung ones. The most circulated and popular one, in any case, is "Es muß ein Wunderbares sein", one of the few songs by Liszt, of which the tender homogenous mood is nowhere forcefully broken, and which can be purely enjoyed. Remarkable are all of them, those songs, as most individualistic expressions of an interesting personage, who however is behaving very freely towards most of the poems.

In 1879 and 1880 Liszt continued the series of his "Gesammelte Lieder" with songs such as "J'ai perdu ma force et ma vie", "Ihr Glocken von Marling", "Sei still", "Mild wie ein Lufthauch im Mai" (2nd version), "Isten veled (Lebe wohl)", "Mir ist die Welt so freudenleer" and others. Further songs were published 1883. Liszt had until then adopted a very abstract style. Characteristic examples are the new versions of his three sonnets after Petrarca. In comparison with the earlier versions, they are shocking because Liszt took everything away which could remind of Romantic style.

Today, Liszt's songs are nearly entirely forgotten. One exception is the often-cited "Ich möchte hingehen", due to a single bar which resembles the opening motif of Wagner's "Tristan und Isolde". While it is commonly claimed that Liszt wrote that motif ten years before Wagner started work on his masterpiece, it has turned out that this is not true: the original version of "Ich möchte hingehn" was composed in 1844 or 1845. There are four manuscripts, and only a single one, a copy by August Conradi, contains the said bar with the Tristan motif. It is on a paste-over in Liszt's hand. Since Liszt was in the second half of 1858 preparing his songs for publication, and he just at that time received the first act of Wagner's Tristan, it is most likely that the version on the paste-over was a quotation from Wagner. This is not to say, the motif was originally invented by Wagner. An earlier example can be found in bar 129 of Liszt's Ballade No.2 in B Minor for piano, composed 1853.

== Liszt and program music ==
Liszt, in some of his works, supported the idea of program music. It means that there was a subject of non-musical kind, the "program", which was in a sense connected with a sounding work. Examples are Liszt's Symphonic Poems, his Symphonies after Faust and Dante, his two Legends for piano and many others. This is not to say, Liszt had invented program music. In his essay about Berlioz and the Harold-Symphony, he himself took the point of view that there had been program music in all times. In fact, looking at the first half of the 19th century, there had been Beethoven's Pastoral-Symphony and overtures such as "Die Weihe des Hauses". Beethoven's "battle symphony" Wellingtons Sieg oder die Schlacht bei Vittoria had been very famous. Further examples are works by Berlioz and overtures such as "Meeresstille und glückliche Fahrt" by Mendelssohn. In 1846, César Franck composed a symphonic work "Ce qu'on entend sur la montagne", based on a Victor Hugo poem. The same poem was shortly afterwards taken by Liszt as subject of a symphonic fantasy, an early version of his Symphonic Poem Ce qu'on entend sur la montagne.

As far as there was a radical new idea in the 19th century, it was the idea of "absolute music". This idea was supported by Eduard Hanslick in his thesis "Vom musikalisch Schönen" which was 1854 published with Liszt's help. In a first part of his book, Hanslick gave examples in order to show that music had been considered as language of emotions before. In contrast to this, Hanslick claimed that the possibilities of music were not sufficiently precise. Without neglecting that a piece of music could evoke emotions or that emotions could be an important help for a composer to get inspiration for a new work, there was a problem of intelligibleness. There were the composer's emotions at the one side and emotions of a listener at the other side. Both kinds of emotions could be completely different. For such reasons, understandable program music was by Hanslick regarded as impossible. According to him, the true value of a piece of music was exclusively dependent on its value as "absolute music". It was meant in a sense that the music was heard without any knowledge of a program, as "tönend bewegte Formen" ("sounding moving forms").

An example which illustrates the problem might be Liszt's "La Notte", the second piece of the Trois Odes funèbres. Projected 1863 and achieved 1864, "La Notte" is an extended version of the prior piano piece Il penseroso from the second part of the Années de pèlerinage. According to Liszt's remark at the end of the autograph score, "La Notte" should be played at his own funeral. From this it is clear that "La Notte" ("The night") means "Death". "Il penseroso", "The thinking", could be "Thoughtful" in English. "Thoughtful", the English word, was a nickname, used by Liszt for him himself in his early letters to Marie d'Agoult. In this sense "Il penseroso", i. e. "Thoughtful", means "Liszt". When composing "La Notte", Liszt extended the piece "Il penseroso" by adding a middle section with melodies in Hungarian czardas style. At the beginning of this section he wrote "...dulces moriens reminiscitur Argos" ("...dying, he is sweetly remembering Argos.") It is a quotation from Vergil's Aeneid. Antor, when he dies, thinks back to his homeland Argos in Greece. It was obviously meant in a sense that Liszt wished to be imagined as a person who, when dying, was remembering his own homeland Hungary. There is no doubt that all this was important for Liszt, but hardly anybody, without explanations just listening to the music, will be able to adequately understand it.

Liszt's own point of view regarding program music can for the time of his youth been taken from the preface of the Album d'un voyageur (1837). According to this, a landscape could evoke a certain kind of mood when being looked at. Since a piece of music could also evoke a mood, a mysterious resemblance with the landscape could be imagined. In this sense the music would not paint the landscape, but it would match the landscape in a third category, the mood.

In July 1854 Liszt wrote his essay about Berlioz and the Harold-Symphony which can be taken as his reply to the thesis by Hanslick. Liszt assured that, of course, not all music was program music. If, in the heat of a debate, a person would go so far as to claim the contrary, it would be better to put all ideas of program music aside. But it would be possible to take means like harmonization, modulation, rhythm, instrumentation and others in order to let a musical motif endure a fate. In any case, a program should only be added to a piece of music if it was necessarily needed for an adequate understanding of that piece.

Still later, in a letter to Marie d'Agoult of November 15, 1864, Liszt wrote:

Without any reserve I completely subscribe the rule of which you so kindly want to remind me, that those musical works which are in a general sense following a program must take effect on imagination and emotion, independent of any program. In other words: All beautiful music must at first rate and always satisfy the absolute rules of music which are not to be violated or prescribed.

This last point of view is very much resembling Hanslick's opinion. It is therefore not surprising that Liszt and Hanslick were not enemies. Whenever they met they did it with nearly friendly manners. In fact, Hanslick never denied that he considered Liszt as composer of genius. He just did not like some of Liszt's works as music.

== Late works ==
With some works from the end of the Weimar years a development commenced during which Liszt drifted more and more away from the musical taste of his time. An early example is the melodrama "Der traurige Mönch" ("The sad monk") after a poem by Nikolaus Lenau, composed in the beginning of October 1860. While in the 19th century harmonies were usually considered as major or minor triads to which dissonances could be added, Liszt took the augmented triad as central chord.

More examples can be found in the third volume of Liszt's Années de Pèlerinage. "Les Jeux d'Eaux à la Villa d'Este" ("The Fountains of the Villa d'Este"), composed in September 1877 and in usual sense well sounding, foreshadows the impressionism of pieces on similar subjects by Debussy and Ravel. But besides, there are pieces like the "Marche funèbre, En mémoire de Maximilian I, Empereur du Mexique" ("Funeral march, In memory of Maximilian I, Emperor of Mexico"), composed 1867, without any stylistic parallel in the 19th and 20th centuries.

At a later step Liszt experimented with "forbidden" things such as parallel 5ths in the "Csardas marcabre" and atonality in the Bagatelle sans tonalité ("Bagatelle without Tonality"). In the last part of his "2de Valse oubliée" ("2nd Forgotten waltz") Liszt composed that he could not find a lyrical melody. Pieces like the "2d Mephisto-Waltz" are shocking with nearly endless repetitions of short motives. Also characteristic are the Via crucis of 1878 as well as pieces such as the two Lugubrious Gondolas, Unstern! and Nuages gris of the 1880s.

Besides eccentricities of such kinds, Liszt still made transcriptions of works by other composers. They are in most cases written in a more conventional style. But also in this genre Liszt arrived at a problematic end. An example from 1885 is a new version of his transcription of the "Pilgerchor" from Wagner's "Tannhäuser". Had the earlier version's title been "Chor der jüngeren Pilger", it was now "Chor der älteren Pilger". In fact, the pilgrims of the new version have become old and very tired. In the old complete-edition of the "Franz Liszt Stiftung" this version was omitted since it was feared, it might throw a bad light on Liszt as composer.

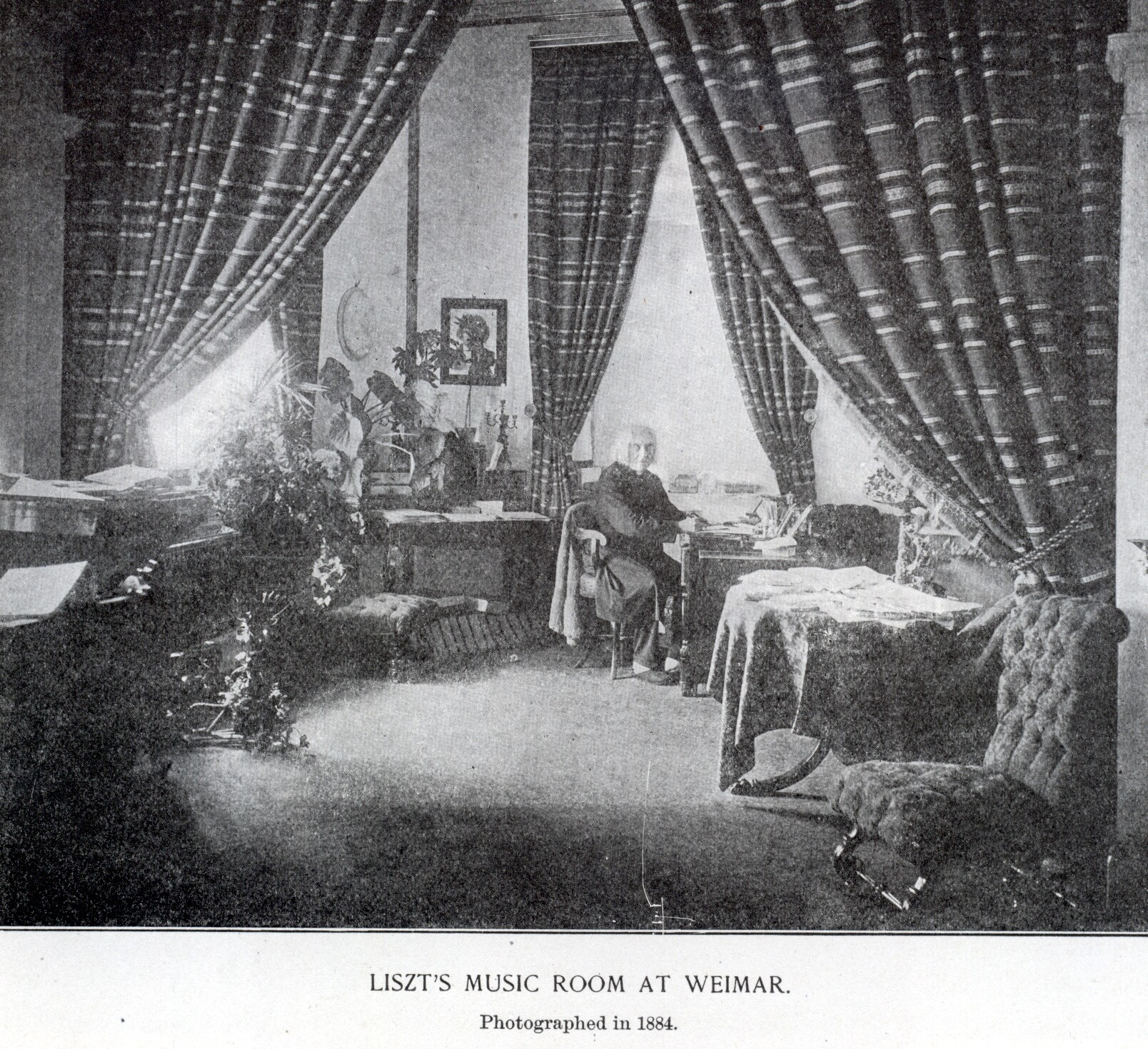
Liszt in his music room in Weimar, photograph by Louis Held, June 1884.

One of the most striking of Liszt's late paraphrases is his setting of the Sarabande and Chaconne from Handel's opera Almira. This transcription was composed in 1879 for his English pupil Walter Bache, and it is the only setting of a baroque piece from Liszt's late period. Liszt's last song transcription was on Anton Rubinstein's "Der Asra" after a poem by Heine. No words are included, and the keyboard setting is reduced nearly to the absurd. In several parts the melody is missing. One of those parts is that with words, "Deinen Namen will ich wissen, deine Heimath, deine Sippschaft!" ("I want to know your name, your homeland, your tribe!") The answer is given at the song's end, but again without melody, i.e. with unspoken words. "Mein Stamm sind jene Asra, die sterben, wenn sie lieben." ("My tribe are those Asras, who are dying when they love.") Even more hidden, Liszt implemented still another answer in his piece. To the part with the question he put an ossia in which also the original accompaniment has disappeared. As own melody by Liszt, the solitary left hand plays a motive with two triplets, most resembling the opening motive of his Tasso. The key is the Gypsy or Hungarian variant of g-Minor. In this sense it was Liszt's answer that his name was "Tasso", with meaning of an artist of outstanding creativity. His true homeland was art. But besides, he was until the grave "in heart and mind" Hungarian.

Several of Liszt's pupils of the 1880s left behind records from which the pieces played by themselves and their fellow students are known. With very few exceptions, the composer Liszt of the 1870s and 1880s did not exist in their repertoire. When a student, nearly always August Stradal or August Göllerich, played one of his late pieces, Liszt used to give sarcastic comments to it, of the sense, the composer had no knowledge of composition at all. If they would play such stuff at a concert, the papers would write, it was a pity that they had wasted their talents with music of such kinds. Further impressions can be drawn from the edition in twelve volumes of Liszt's piano works at Edition Peters, Leipzig, by Emil Sauer.

Sauer had studied under Liszt in his latest years. But also in his edition the composer Liszt of this time does not exist. In the volume with song transcriptions, the latest pieces are the second version of the transcription of Eduard Lassen's "Löse Himmel meine Seele" ("Heaven, let my soul be free") and the transcription of Schumann's "Frühlingsnacht" ("Night in spring"). Liszt had made both in 1872. In a separate volume with the Années de Pèlerinage, the only piece of Liszt's third volume is "Les Jeux d'Eaux à la Villa d'Este", while all of the rest was excluded. Of Liszt's transcriptions and fantasies on operatic melodies, the "Feierliche Marsch zum Heiligen Gral" of 1882 is present. However, also in this case a problematic aspect is to be found. In the original edition at Edition Schott, Mainz, Liszt – in a note at the bottom of the first page – had asked the player to carefully take notice of the indications for the use of the right pedal. In Sauer's edition, the footnote is included, but Liszt's original pedal indications were substituted with pedal indications by Sauer. There is little doubt that Sauer, as well as several further of Liszt's prominent pupils, was convinced that he himself was a better composer than his old master.

== See also ==
- List of compositions by Franz Liszt
- Franz Liszt's treatments of the works of other composers

== Bibliography ==
- Bory, Robert: Diverses lettres inédites de Liszt, in: Schweizerisches Jahrbuch für Musikwissenschaft 3 (1928).
- Bory, Robert: Une retraite romantique en Suisse, Liszt et la Comtesse d'Agoult, Lausanne 1930.
- Burger, Ernst: Franz Liszt, Eine Lebenschronik in Bildern und Dokumenten, München 1986.
- Chiappari, Luciano: Liszt a Firenze, Pisa e Lucca, Pacini, Pisa 1989.
- d’Agoult, Marie (Daniel Stern): Mémoires, Souvenirs et Journaux I/II, Présentation et Notes de Charles F. Dupêchez, Mercure de France 1990.
- Dupêchez, Charles F.: Marie d’Agoult 1805-1876, 2e édition corrigée, Paris 1994.
- Gut, Serge: Liszt, De Falois, Paris 1989.
- Jerger, Wilhelm (ed.): The Piano Master Classes of Franz Liszt 1884–1886, Diary Notes of August Gollerich, translated by Richard Louis Zimdars, Indiana University Press 1996.
- Jung, Franz Rudolf (ed.): Franz Liszt in seinen Briefen, Berlin 1987.
- Keeling, Geraldine: Liszt’s Appearances in Parisian Concerts, Part 1: 1824-1833, in: Liszt Society Journal 11 (1986), p. 22 sqq., Part 2: 1834-1844, in: Liszt Society Journal 12 (1987), p. 8 sqq.
- Legány, Deszö: Franz Liszt, Unbekannte Presse und Briefe aus Wien 1822-1886, Wien 1984.
- Liszt, Franz: Briefwechsel mit seiner Mutter, edited and annotated by Klara Hamburger, Eisenstadt 2000.
- Liszt, Franz and d'Agoult, Marie: Correspondence, ed. Daniel Ollivier, Tome 1: 1833-1840, Paris 1933, Tome II: 1840-1864, Paris 1934.
- Marix-Spire, Thérése: Les romantiques et la musique, le cas George Sand, Paris 1954.
- Mendelssohn Bartholdy, Felix: Reisebriefe aus den Jahren 1830 bis 1832, ed. Paul Mendelssohn Bartholdy, Leipzig 1864.
- Ollivier, Daniel: Autour de Mme d’Agoult et de Liszt, Paris 1941.
- Óvári, Jósef: Ferenc Liszt, Budapest 2003.
- Protzies, Günther: Studien zur Biographie Franz Liszts und zu ausgewählten seiner Klavierwerke in der Zeit der Jahre 1828 - 1846, Bochum 2004.
- Raabe, Peter: Liszts Schaffen, Cotta, Stuttgart und Berlin 1931.
- Ramann, Lina: Liszt-Pädagogium, Reprint of the edition Leipzig 1902, Breitkopf & Härtel, Wiesbaden, 1986.
- Ramann, Lina: Lisztiana, Erinnerungen an Franz Liszt in Tagebuchblättern, Briefen und Dokumenten aus den Jahren 1873-1886/87, ed. Arthur Seidl, text revision by Friedrich Schnapp, Mainz 1983.
- Redepenning, Dorothea: Das Spätwerk Franz Liszts: Bearbeitungen eigener Kompositionen, Hamburger Beiträge zur Musikwissenschaft 27, Hamburg 1984.
- Rellstab, Ludwig: Franz Liszt, Berlin 1842.
- ed Sadie, Stanley, The New Grove Dictionary of Music and Musicians, First Edition (London: Macmillan, 1980). ISBN 0-333-23111-2
  - Searle, Humphrey, "Liszt, Franz"
- Sand, George: Correspondence, Textes réunis, classés et annotés par Georges Lubin, Tome 1 (1812–1831), Tome 2 (1832-Juin 1835), Tome 3 (Juillet 1835-Avril 1837), Paris 1964, 1966, 1967.
- Saffle, Michael: Liszt in Germany, 1840-1845, Franz Liszt Studies Series No.2, Pendragon Press, Stuyvesant, NY, 1994.
- Schilling, Gustav: Franz Liszt, Stuttgart 1844.
- Vier, Jacques: Marie d’Agoult - Son mari – ses amis: Documents inédits, Paris 1950.
- Vier, Jacques: La Comtesse d’Agoult et son temps, Tome 1, Paris 1958.
- Vier, Jacques: L’artiste - le clerc: Documents inédits, Paris 1950.
- Walker, Alan: Franz Liszt, The Virtuoso Years (1811–1847), revised edition, Cornell University Press 1987.
- Walker, Alan: Franz Liszt, The Weimar Years (1848–1861), Cornell University Press 1989.
- Walker, Alan: Franz Liszt, The Final Years (1861–1886), Cornell University Press 1997.
- Walker, Alan (ed.): The Death of Franz Liszt: Based on the Unpublished Diary of His Pupil Lina Schmalhausen by Lina Schmalhausen, edited and annotated by Alan Walker, Cornell University Press 2002.
- Walker, Alan: Article "Franz Liszt" in: Grove Music Online, ed. L. Macy (Accessed November 5, 2007), (subscription access).
