= Late works of Franz Liszt =

Works of the Hungarian composer

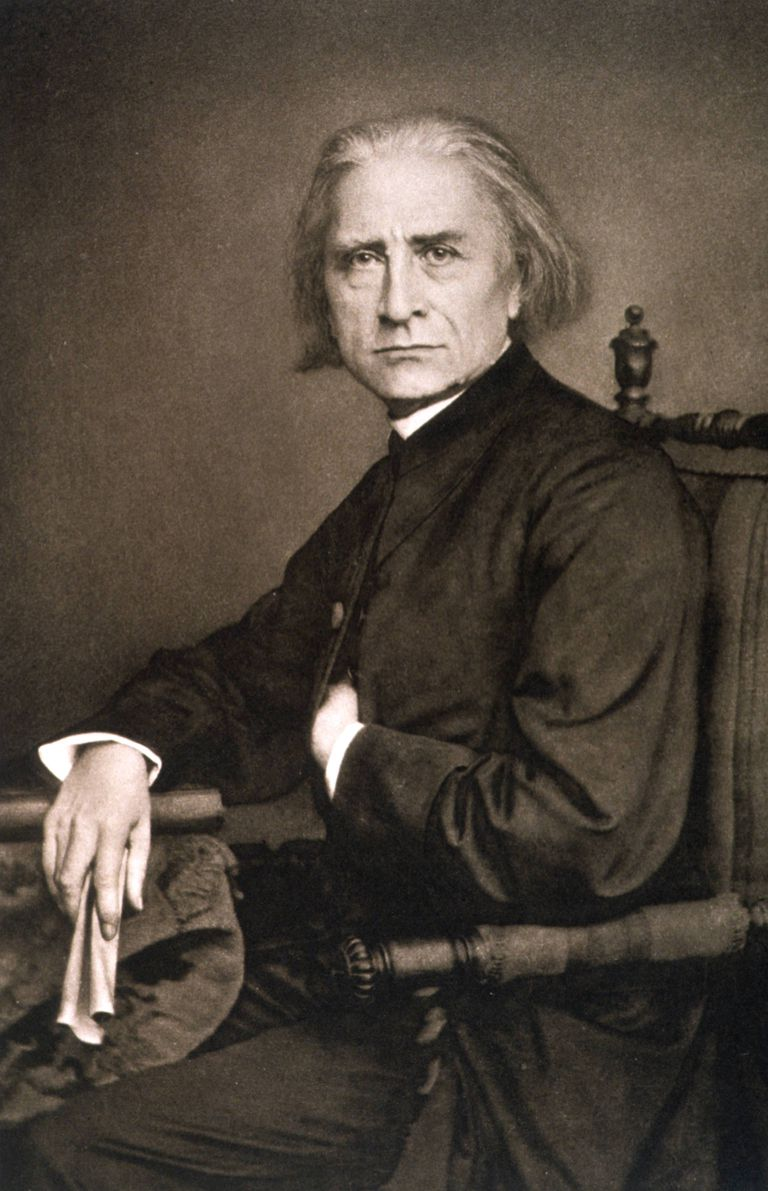
Franz Liszt in 1870

The radical change Franz Liszt's compositional style underwent in the last 20 years of his life was unprecedented in Western classical music. The tradition of music had been one of unified progression, even to the extent of Johannes Brahms' First Symphony being known as "Beethoven's Tenth". Beethoven's own three periods of composition are monolithic and united. Liszt's, by comparison, seem deconstructivist. Replacing pages which in Liszt's earlier compositions had been thick with notes and virtuoso passages was a starkness where every note and rest was carefully weighed and calculated, while the works themselves become more experimental harmonically and formally.

However, as with his earlier compositions, Liszt's later works continued to abound with forward-looking technical devices. Works such as Bagatelle sans tonalité ("Bagatelle without Tonality") foreshadow in intent, if not in exact manner, composers who would further explore the modern concept of atonality. Liszt's work also foreshadowed the impressionism that would characterize the work of Debussy and Ravel, as shown in Les Jeux d'Eaux à la Villa d'Este (The Fountains of the Villa d'Este) from the third volume of Années de Pèlerinage. Another precursor of impressionism is Nuages gris, which won the admiration of both Debussy and Stravinsky.

== Technique ==
=== Economy of means ===
Compared to the creative abundance of earlier compositions, the music of Liszt's old age is unusually economic. Given barely enough notes to ensure their existence, his late pieces frequently lapse into monody, then silence. Sometimes a piece is open-ended, simply vanishing. This practice of "abandoning" a work in mid-air had been done previously by Frédéric Chopin and Robert Schumann. Liszt's practice, however, is more radical. An example of this is in the Mephisto Polka, where the piece is simply deserted at the end, without explanation, dying out on a solitary F-natural. Long passages are spun out on single notes and definite cadences are usually avoided, often leaving the overall tonality of pieces in doubt. A basic rhythmic unit, instead of becoming the foundation of an expansive Romantic melody, now becomes a stark end-product in itself. Throughout the late works, there is a freer, almost improvisatory use of melody, yet one derived from the tightest structural cells Liszt could conceive.

=== Tonality ===
Liszt never lost interest in the question of tonality—a question which, for Liszt, was long standing. As early as 1832 he had attended a series of lectures given by Fétis. From these lectures, Liszt derived the idea of an onde omnitonique, much like a Schoenbergian tone row, that would become a logical replacement for traditional tonality. For him such a row would be part of the historical process from a "unitonic" (tonality) moved to a "pluritonic" (polytonality) and ended in an "omnitonic" (atonality), where every note became a tonic. In his marginalia to Ramann's biography of him, made after he had turned 70, Liszt called the "omnitonic" an Endziel or final goal of the historical process. He also composed a "Prélude omnitonique" to illustrate his theory. This piece was long considered lost but has recently been discovered.

Remaining lost, however, are the sketches for Liszt's treatise on modern harmony. Arthur Friedheim, a piano student of Liszt who became his personal secretary, wrote of seeing it among Liszt's papers at Weimar:

In his later years the Master had formed the habit of rising at five o'clock in the morning, and I paid him many a solitary visit at that hour, even playing to him occasionally. Jokingly, he would inquire whether I were still up, or already up. On the last of these matutinal visits I found him poring over books and old manuscripts. With his permission I joined him in this very interesting occupation. Catching sight of one manuscript which particularly drew my attention, I picked it up saying: "This will make you responsible for a lot of nonsense which is bound to be written someday." I expected a rebuke for my remark, but he answered very seriously: "That may be. I have not published it because the time for it is not yet ripe." The title of this little book was Sketches for a Harmony of the Future.

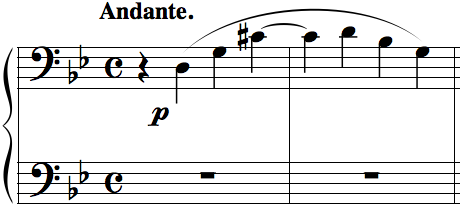
The first two bars of Nuages Gris illustrate the use of quartal harmony.

While the Sketches may have disappeared, Liszt left enough music from this period for listeners to surmise what that manuscript may have contained. Nuages gris is pointed out by several critics as a piece which could be heard as a gateway to modern music. One of its more intriguing features is its ending, which drifts off into keylessness and progresses to that point in a manner foretelling impressionism in music.

Liszt was also one of the first composers to experiment with bitonality. One example occurs in the funeral march he wrote for László Teleky in his Historische ungarische Bildnisse (Historical Hungarian Portraits). This march is based on a four note ostinato based on the gypsy scale. The question of whether this ostinato is in G minor or B minor, and the resulting tonal ambiguity, remains unresolved.

=== Chord structure ===
Liszt became a pioneer in building new chords. Until the end of the 19th century the triad remained the prime architectural element in chordal structure. Few composers seemed to question whether chords built by other means were possible. One advance Liszt made was the use of minor and major chords struck together, a device he used in works such as the Czárdás obstinée. Another advance was in building chords in intervals other than thirds. This meant dispensing altogether with the triad in its former place of supremacy.

A prime example of Liszt's experimenting is the pile-up of thirds in the vocal work Ossa arida, which he wrote in 1879. Inspired by the vision of Ezekiel ("O ye dry bones, hear the word of the Lord"), Liszt depicts musically the raising up of the flesh from the dust by gathering up all the notes of the diatonic scale in a rising column, then sounding them simultaneously. There was no precedent to this approach and the piece retains a striking originality. A similar approach is the pile-up of fourths at the beginning of the Third Mephisto Waltz, written in 1883. At the climax of the piano piece Unstern! Liszt places two mutually exclusive chords against each other. Alan Walker quotes Peter Raabe as stating that the sounding of those two chords together is like a prisoner hammering on a wall, knowing full well that no one would hear him.

=== Harmony ===
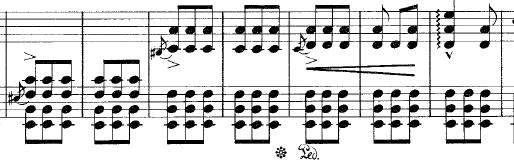
Excerpt from the beginning of the Mephisto Waltz No. 1.

Liszt's dispensing with the triad altogether as a basis for the harmonic aspect of music was well ahead of his time. Arnold Schoenberg started experimenting with building chords in fourths more than 30 years after Liszt had done so. People reportedly knowledgeable in music hailed Schoenberg's attempts at that time as "new." However, Liszt had done the same not only in then-unpublished works such as the Third Mephisto Waltz but also in published ones such as the Hungarian Rhapsody No. 17. Even in a popular work such as the Mephisto Waltz No. 1, the originality of its piling-up of fifths at its onset was remarkably forward for its time. The augmented triads of Unstern! (written in 1885) had already appeared in the Faust Symphony; the bare parallel fifths of the Czárdás macabre, as already mentioned, had helped the devil tune up in the Mephisto Waltz No. 1. However, Liszt makes more use in the late works of implied harmony, Chords hang unresolved, as at the close of Nuages Gris, and melodies are unaccompanied. Liszt's experimentation was accompanied by a bolder use of chromaticism in two forms—that which originated from gypsy music as well as that of Romantic style, with its sinuous counterpoint and enharmonic ambiguities.

=== Scales and modes ===
Liszt's interest in unusual scales and modes increased greatly in his last years. This may have been a side benefit of his growing involvement in the political and musical destiny of Hungary as well as in nationalist music in general. He was led to explore or investigate in greater detail the scales of Hungarian and east European music. This exploration of a specifically Hungarian mode of expression would profoundly influence Bartók. The whole-tone scale was another source of interest for Liszt.

== A more complex picture ==
In one sense, it can be tempting to think of the late pieces as an extension of Liszt's earlier works, as they exhibit a similar adventurousness harmonically, an intense chromaticism and a tonal ambiguity. What is new is the sadness of heart which pervades many of the late works. As tempting as it can be to think of Liszt as the father of modern music on the basis of his late music, looking at his achievements in these works as ends in themselves would be erroneous. Liszt's technical achievements in his late music are one side of a more complex picture. Along with the increasing interest in Hungarian and other national schools of composition already mentioned, essential parts of this picture are tragedy in Liszt's personal life and developments in his friendship with Wagner.

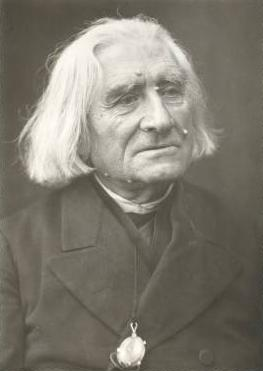
Photograph of Liszt in the 1880s.

In his later years Liszt's problems with health, both physical and mental, affected his ability to complete compositions. By the early 1880s, Liszt was often ravaged by a universal sadness, descending without warning and threatening to overwhelm everything he did. He told Lina Ramann, "I carry with me a deep sadness of the heart which must now and then break out in sound." In addition, the deaths of his son Daniel in 1859 and daughter Blandine in 1862 brought a phase of deep personal anguish that impacted greatly on his creative life. As he grew older, he was also deeply affected by the deaths of certain political figures, artists and personal acquaintances. These events, among others, triggered elegiac outpourings ranging from the unusual to the bizarre. Liszt was already known for drinking considerable amounts of alcohol with no detectable effects on his speech or piano playing; however, beginning in 1882, friends became concerned with the quality of the alcohol he consumed, which now included absinthe. It is very possible that alcohol both fed his depressive moods and limited his powers of concentration.

One point not normally discussed with Liszt but not unfamiliar to late-19th-century composers was his consciousness of working in the shadow of composers he considered giants. In Liszt's case, the shadows were those of Beethoven and Wagner. He professed to find consolation and inspiration in their works. However, it is also possible their greatness may have had an effect on his own ability to compose. While he blamed his inability to complete compositions on his busy social calendar as late as the early 1870s, by the late 1870s he began to express fears of failing creativity on his part. However, most critically, Liszt was not entirely deterred by his insecurities or growing awareness of waning powers. He continued working until a year before his death, by which time cataracts made composition virtually impossible.

Liszt wrestled daily with the demons of desolation, despair and death, bringing forth music that utterly failed to find its audience. We now know, in retrospect, that Liszt's contemporaries were offered a glimpse into a mind on the verge of catastrophe. They formed what Bence Szabolcsi calls "a conspiracy of silence" on the late pieces — one not lifted until modern times.

Liszt's works from this period fall into three categories:

- Music of retrospection
- Music of despair
- Music of death

The first category contains pieces in which a troubled spirit seeks consolation in memories of the past. Liszt referred to this music as his "forgotten" pieces — sardonically referring to compositions forgotten before even played, with titles such as Valse oubliée, Polka oubliée and Romance oubliée.

The second category, music of despair, can appear much more important since the titles of the pieces in this category would seem to point to a troubled mind. These titles include:

- Schlaflos! Frage und Antwort
- Unstern! Sinistre, Disastro
- Nuages gris
- Ossa arida
- Csárdás macabre
- Abschied

These pieces, as well as others in this category, can be best understood as fragments broken off from a greater whole, each offering a glimpse of a pathology of despair. Though they do not share any overtly musical connections, they seem to fit with one another like members of a large family who never settle on one place yet become acquainted through chance encounters at smaller gatherings.

The third category, music of death, contains pieces where Liszt raised grief to high art. Memorials, elegies, funerals and other aspects of the grieving process find their place in this music. Again, a sampling of titles in this grouping:

- Funeral March for Emperor Maximilian
- Seven Hungarian Historical Portraits
1. Széchenyi István (Lament)
2. Eötvös Jôzsef
3. Vörösmarty Mihály
4. Teleki László (Funeral Music)
5. Deák Ferenc
6. Petõfi Sándor (In Memory of)
7. Mosonyi Mihály (Funeral Music)
- Funeral Prelude and Funeral March
- Elegy in Memory of Mme Mouchanoff
- Und wir dachten der Toten (And We Thought of the Dead)

Liszt once referred to his works in this category as his "mortuary pieces", perhaps as a joke intended to deflect criticism. As Walker puts it: "These pieces reveal a soul in turmoil. Since that is also a part of the human condition, there can be something here for all of us".

== Survey of works ==
Liszt wrote approximately 100 individual works for solo piano, as well as many others for various vocal ensembles and couple of orchestral works, from 1869 to the end of his life. While some of these piano works are actually collections of pieces, the late pieces are almost entirely smaller works. Liszt had completed virtually all of his large-scale works, including the oratorio Christus; the only other large work he had planned, the oratorio St. Stanislaus, would remain unfinished at the time of his death, more than likely due to ill health rather than any mental incapacity

The late works of Franz Liszt can be grouped into six categories:

=== Music based on the works of others ===
While it is generally not recognized that Liszt continued writing transcriptions into his old age, this is actually by far the largest category of works he produced during this period. It numbers 35 items, two of which are collections (two sets of arrangements of songs by Robert and Clara Schumann.) Moreover, many of these works continue to employ the virtuoso style of his earlier career. One example of this is the Réminiscences de Boccanegra, based on the Verdi opera and written in 1882.

Liszt's musical allegiances are clear from the pieces he chose to set. He continued to transcribe music by his son-in-law Richard Wagner and seemed equally fond of Italian music. He considered Camille Saint-Saëns a musical ally, setting his Danse macabre in 1876; this work in turn may have influenced some of Liszt's later diabolic works, such as the Csárdás macabre. He also championed Russian music of different styles and schools. These composers included Dargomyzhsky, Tchaikovsky, Anton Rubinstein and Cui. Liszt admired the Russians especially for challenging Germanic hegemony over matters of taste and style. One of the most striking of Liszt's late paraphrases is his setting of the Sarabande and Chaconne from Handel's opera Almira. This transcription was composed in 1879 for his English pupil Walter Bache, and it is the only setting of a baroque piece from Liszt's late period.

=== Abstract compositions ===
This group of works is considerably smaller than the other groups, numbering only five works without any explicit programmatic information. Nearly every item dates from 1873 or earlier; the only exceptions are the final two of the Five Little Pieces, not published until 1963. Many of these pieces are also studies in advanced harmony. The Toccata, for instance, contrasts major versus minor and diatonic versus chromatic harmony.

One work in this category that should not be considered a late work is the Fantasy and Fugue on the Theme B-A-C-H. While it was composed in 1870 and published in 1871, it is written in his earlier style and is a type of work that he did not compose afterwards. It is based on Liszt's Prelude and Fugue on the Name B-A-C-H, written for organ in 1855-6 and revised in 1869-70. He arranged the revised organ work for piano and published it with a slightly different title.

=== Nationalistic and celebratory work ===
This became an extremely important part of Liszt's compositional output. It consists of 29 works of a festive or patriotic character, 15 of which are associated specifically with Hungary, including the set of seven Hungarian Historical Portraits completed in 1885. Liszt was often called upon to write music for state occasions, producing three marches and the Szózat und Ungarischer Hymnus, a setting of the Hungarian national anthem noted for its use of unusual scales together with the juxtaposition of chromatically related harmonies.

Liszt stopped writing in the Hungarian style after 1873 but resumed doing so in 1881; this was the year he visited his birthplace, Raiding. Liszt discovered late in life that writing Hungarian music allowed him to experiment more freely, as though asserting his national identity provided the strength and sense of purpose to break away from the limitations of Western European music. For the first time he turned his attention to the czárdás, a Hungarian folk dance. He may have also been influenced in this by Saint-Saëns, whose Danse Macabre shares a similar use of parallel fifths to his Czárdás macabre, composed in 1881-2. However, Liszt employs his musical material in this work with an extroverted vigor anticipating Béla Bartók. The same could be said of the second, third and fourth Mephisto Waltzes, the second of which was dedicated to Saint-Saëns.

The three czárdás that Liszt wrote—titled Czárdás, Czárdás obstinée and Czárdás macabre—are less freely treated than the Hungarian Rhapsodies and remain more specifically Hungarian than gypsy in thematic material. Their spare lines, angular rhythms and advanced harmonies show these pieces to be direct ancestors of Bartók's work. Because of these attributes, the czárdás are considered by Liszt scholars among the more interesting of the composer's late output. The same, some critics argue, cannot be said as uniformly about his Hungarian Rhapsodies 16-19, composed after he had neglected the genre 30 years. Of these four late rhapsodies, only the last contains the variety, vivacity and sweep of the best of the earlier ones to make it effective in concert; the others fail to become satisfactory pieces due to their fragmentary treatment. The final rhapsody is based on themes from Ábrányi's Csárdás nobles; the other three are based on original material.

One potential pitfall in discussing these works is labeling them as atonal on the basis of hearing strange sonorities at the surface of the music. The Czárdás macabre, for instance, is solidly based on compositional procedures consistent with Liszt's earlier style. The music focuses on variant forms of the mediant with concomitant contrast of sharp and flat key areas—in this case F major, F♯ minor and G♭ major.

=== Sacred music ===
The sacred keyboard music is a small group of pieces, the most substantial of which were written mainly between 1877 and 1879. Several of these works are arranged from vocal music, including a piano solo arrangement of Via crucis, one of Liszt's most daring and original compositions. Along with extended vocal works such as Via Crucis and Rosario, Liszt wrote 29 shorter choral works and a setting of Psalm 129.

Via Crucis is perhaps the closest Liszt came to creating a new kind of church music through combining a new harmonic language with traditional liturgy. While the overall atmosphere is restrained and devout in feeling, the harmony underpinning the music is experimental, including an extensive use of the whole-tone scale. While the composer uses familiar chorale and hymn tunes, the overall impression aurally is of an unsettled tonal language. Three of the 15 numbers (an introduction along with depictions of the 14 Stations of the Cross) employ sliding chromatic lines and harmonies; and when those harmonies do come to rest, they are often diminished or unique. Other Stations use successive chromatic chords and may abruptly end on a single tone.

=== Music of premonition, death and mourning ===
Liszt's works in this category make up a small but important collection of 13 individual works, including the two versions of La lugubre gondola. Some pieces from book III of Annees de Pelerinage could fit here, as could Via Crucis and the Historical Hungarian Portraits. Liszt was deeply affected by the deaths of friends and loved ones throughout his life; these losses, in turn, had a profound impact on the types of works Liszt would write. Like the sacred music, Liszt's works of premonition, death and mourning came from a deep inner impulse and he usually did not seek their publication. Many of these works are among his most unusual compositions, which stood in the way of their general accessibility.

=== Programmatic music ===
Works in this category carry special, non-generic titles. They include the Four Mephisto Waltzes, the four Valses oubliées, and the orchestral and piano solo versions of the symphonic poem From the Cradle to the Grave. These works were written primarily after 1876, many of them after the pivotal year of 1881, when Liszt fell down the stairs of the Hofgärtnerei in Weimar and his health took a precipitous slide. Contrary to the general reputation of Liszt's late works as gloomy and austere, the pieces in this category generally feature at least one of the attributes commonly associated with his earlier style—diabolical energy, brilliant effects of vertiginous dancing, tender nostalgia and ardent passion.

== See also ==
- List of compositions by Franz Liszt

== Bibliography ==
- Friedheim, Arthur, ed. Theodore L. Bullock, Life and Liszt: The Recollections of a Concert Pianist (New York, 1961).
- ed. Hamilton, Kenneth, The Cambridge Companion to Liszt (Cambridge and New York: Cambridge University Press, 2005). ISBN 0-521-64462-3 (paperback).
  - Baker, James M., "A survey of the late piano works"
  - Baker, James M., "Larger forms in the late piano works"
  - Pesce, Dolores, "Liszt's sacred choral music"
- Howard, Leslie, Notes for Hyperion CDA66371/2, Liszt at the Opera I, Leslie Howard, piano.
- Howard, Leslie, Notes for Hyperion CDA66811/2, Liszt Dances and Marches, Leslie Howard, piano.
- Le Van, Eric, Notes for BMG-Arte Nova 74321 76809 2/ Oehms Classics OC 246. Complete Works for Cello and Piano. Guido Schiefen (cello); Eric Le Van (piano)
- Searle, Geoffrey, The Music of Liszt (New York: Dover Publications, Inc., 1966). Library of Congress Card Catalog Number 66-27581
- Searle, Geoffrey, ed. Stanley Sadie, "Liszt, Franz", The New Grove Dictionary of Music and Musicians, 20 vols. (London: Macmillan, 1980). ISBN 0-333-23111-2.
- ed. Walker, Alan, Franz Liszt: The Man and His Music (New York: Taplinger Publishing Company, 1970). ISBN 0-8008-2990-5
  - Ogdon, John, "Solo Piano Music (1861-86)"
  - Walker, Alan, "Liszt and the Twentieth Century"
- Walker, Alan, Liszt: The Final Years, 1861-1886 (Cornell University Press, 1997).
- Walker, Alan, ed. Stanley Sadie, "Liszt, Franz", The New Grove Dictionary of Music and Musicians, Second Edition, 29 vols. (London: Macmillan, 2001). ISBN to come.
