= La Notte (disambiguation) =

La Notte is a 1961 Italian drama film directed by Michelangelo Antonioni.

La Notte (Italian for The Night) may also refer to:

- La Notte (album), a 2013 album by Norwegian pianist Ketil Bjørnstad
- Nativity (Correggio) or La Notte, a 1529–1530 painting by Antonio da Correggio
- La Notte (newspaper), an Italian afternoon newspaper published from 1952 –1995
- "La notte" (song), a 2012 song by Arisa
- The title of several compositions by Franz Liszt
  - The second piece of the Trois Odes funèbres; see Musical works of Franz Liszt § Liszt and program music
- The title of several compositions by Antonio Vivaldi
  - Flute Concerto No. 2 in G minor, RV 439; see Six Flute Concertos, Op. 10 (Vivaldi)
- Silvia La Notte (born 1982), Italian kickboxer

== See also ==
- Lanotte, a surname
- Notte, a river of Brandenburg, Germany
