= Lanette =

Lanette is a feminine given name and variant of Lana. Notable people with the name include:

- Lanette Scheeline (1910–2001), American artist
- Lanette Phillips, American film and music video producer
- Lanette Prediger (born 1979), Canadian skeleton racer

== See also ==
- Lanotte
- Lynette and Lyonesse
