= Csárdás (Liszt) =

Compositions for piano by Franz Liszt

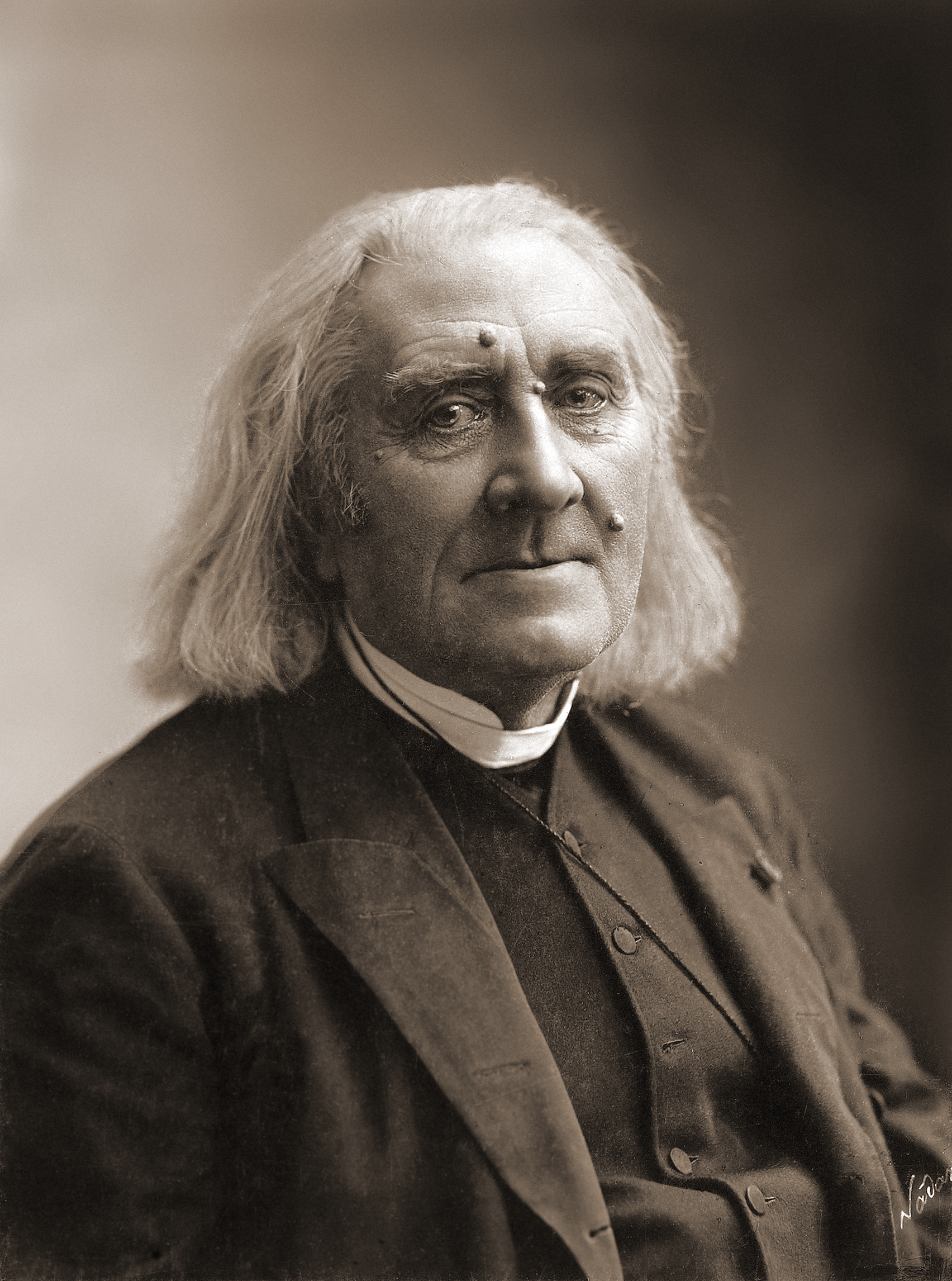
Franz Liszt in March 1886, photographed by Nadar

Franz Liszt wrote three csárdás in 1881–82 and 1884. The pieces are solo piano pieces based on the Hungarian dance form of the same name. Liszt treats the dance form itself much less freely than he did much earlier with the verbunkos in the Hungarian Rhapsodies, and the material itself remains more specifically Hungarian than gypsy in thematic material. Their spare lines, angular rhythms and advanced harmonies show these pieces to be direct ancestors of the compositions of Béla Bartók. Because of these attributes, the csárdás are considered by Liszt scholars among the more interesting of the composer's late output.

One potential pitfall in discussing these works is labeling them as atonal on the basis of hearing strange sonorities at the surface of the music. The Csárdás macabre, for instance, is solidly based on compositional procedures consistent with Liszt's earlier style. The music focuses on variant forms of the mediant with concomitant contrast of sharp and flat key areas—in this case F major, F♯ minor and G♭ major.

== The csárdás ==
=== Csárdás macabre, S.224 (1881–82) ===
This is perhaps the best-known of the three csárdás. The piece is written in a miniature sonata form, with the opening in parallel octaves before the famous bare fifths section which is without precedent in Liszt's output. Still more intriguing is the second-subject stage of the structure; this is either a parody of the Dies irae or a quotation from the Hungarian folk song, "Ég a kunyhó, ropog a nád." Both theories have their advocates. The composer did not indicate what he meant, though he did write on the manuscript after he had finished it, "May one write or listen to such a thing?" A favorite question of some critics is whether the fifth of the opening bar is a flattened supertonic appoggiatura or as an actual tonic. Such tonal ambiguities become common in Liszt's late works.

=== Two Csárdás, S.225 (1884) ===
==== 1. Csárdás ====
Less known than either of the other dances, this csárdás is a short Allegro beginning as though it would be in A minor. It passes to A major, then ends quietly but unsettled on F♯ minor after much sequential modulation.

==== 2. Csárdás obstinée ====
This csárdás begins with a repeated F♯, essentially taking up where the first dance left off, before an ostinato accompaniment begins. An F♯ major triad in the left hand is contrasted with a falling phrase beginning with an A♮ in the right hand. The piece on the whole is written in B minor-major, with major and minor chords being struck simultaneously, a device Liszt came to use with increasing frequency. Before the coda, the theme is transformed in B major in repeated octaves. Some critics consider this work more interesting musically than its more famous cousin, the Csárdás macabre. The piece is, for lack of a better term, obsessed with a four-note motif presented at the beginning of the piece, and the work's tonal excursions into the mediant and submediant place the music procedurally somewhere between Schumann and Mahler.

The first recordings of these two Csárdás was by France Clidat in her traversal of Liszt's works for Decca.

== Bibliography ==
- Baker, James M., ed. Hamilton, Kenneth, "A survey of the late piano works," The Cambridge Companion to Liszt (Cambridge and New York: Cambridge University Press, 2005). ISBN 0-521-64462-3 (paperback).
- Howard, Leslie, Notes for Hyperion CDA66811/2, Liszt: Dances and Marches, Leslie Howard, piano.
- ed. Walker, Alan, Franz Liszt: The Man and His Music (New York: Taplinger Publishing Company, 1970). ISBN 0-8008-2990-5
  - Ogdon, John, "Solo Piano Music (1861-86)"
  - Walker, Alan, "Liszt and the Twentieth Century"
- Walker, Alan, Franz Liszt, Volume 3: The Final Years, 1861-1886 (New York: Alfred A Knopf, 1996). ISBN 0-394-52540-X.
