= Lanotte =

Lanotte is a surname. Notable people with the surname include:

- Alessio Lanotte (born 1992), Italian footballer
- Johan Vande Lanotte (born 1955), Belgian politician
- Luca Lanotte (born 1985), Italian ice dancer

== See also ==
- Lanette
- Silvia La Notte
