= PianoForte Foundation =

PianoForte Foundation Logo

The PianoForte Foundation (PFF) is a 501(c)(3) non-profit organization that presents classical and jazz piano concerts in Chicago, Illinois. Established in 2005 by piano dealer Thomas Zoells, the PFF presents over 60 concerts each year in downtown Chicago and the surrounding suburbs.

== Mission ==
According to its website, the PianoForte Foundation is dedicated to preserving and promoting the art of playing the piano in Chicago and creating a piano community that closely connects audiences and artists. The Foundation works on concerts, festivals, competitions, education, outreach, and public broadcasts. They achieve this mission by:

- Producing small, intimate events that encourage communication between artist and audience.
- Making events approachable to all, regardless of musical knowledge or experience.
- Supporting and presenting today's most exceptional professional and amateur pianists.
- Partnering with a variety of other organizations to bring music into surrounding communities with performance, piano donations, radio broadcasts, and workshops.

== History ==
Thomas Zoells established the PianoForte Foundation in April 2005, one year after he opened PianoForte Chicago, a piano sales business. As an extension of his business, Mr. Zoells began organizing a concert series which led to the establishment of PianoForte Foundation, an independent, non-profit, separately incorporated entity.

PianoForte Studios: In late September 2013, PianoForte Foundation moved from its original location in the historic Fine Arts Building in Chicago's Loop to its newly designed South Loop home. The space houses a new 100-seat venue with state-of-the-art audio and video recording capabilities, piano-equipped practice rooms, PianoForte Foundation headquarters and piano retailer PianoForte Chicago.

== Programming ==
Concerts are organized into several series that run from September to June.

- Salon Series features some of the world's top solo and chamber pianists playing old and new music in a traditional recital format. Salon Series concerts are typically followed by a complimentary post-concert reception where guests have a chance to meet the artists.
- Salon Series LIVE! is an hour-long monthly concert broadcast on Chicago's WFMT 98.7 in front of a live audience. Sponsored by American Chartered Bank and with additional support from the Lakeview Music Society, this program presents artists in the same vein as its Salon Series counterpart.
- Family Series is curated for children ages 3–12 and their families. These fun and educational 45-minute performances include music and discussion about different topics related to the piano and piano performance. Family concerts are typically followed by a milk-and-cookies reception.
- Storytellers is the newest PianoForte Foundation series, aimed towards an audience interested in forming a deeper connection between artists and the music they make. The series presents artists from a variety of genres (classical, jazz, gospel, r&b, rock, etc.) in a mix of performance and storytelling about life experiences, the creative process, and more. Guests are invited to connect with the artists through Q&A and complimentary post-concert receptions.

Other Notable Events:

- Schubertiade Chicago is a free all-day marathon festival celebrating the music of Franz Schubert, and the trademark festival of PianoForte Foundation as the only such event in the Chicago area.
- Chicago Amateur Piano Competition is the first contest in the Midwest honoring the fundamental role amateur pianists have in promoting the piano and its repertoire. Held at Sherwood Community Music School at Columbia College Chicago, it consists of competition rounds, guest lectures, masterclasses, and social events

== Community/Educational Involvement ==
The foundation has created the following programs:

- The Gift of Pianos Program, which is a joint effort by PianoForte Foundation and the Chicago Chapter of the Piano Technicians Guild (PTG) to refurbish donated pianos and place them in schools, churches, and community institutions that lack resources but need a quality instrument.
- Piano Lesson Scholarships, open to any student in grades 5–12 in the Chicago area, this program awards 5 participants the opportunity to receive 32 weeks of piano instruction during the school year, access to practice space, lesson materials and tickets to all PianoForte Foundation concerts at no cost through an application process and with proof of financial need.
- PianoForte Sessions, hosted in conjunction with the Chicago Jazz Festival, this set of free concerts showcases some of the best jazz pianists in Chicago in a tradition recital format.

== Collaborations and awards ==
The PianoForte Foundation has collaborated with Chicago arts organizations as CUBE, Chicago Opera Theater, the Chicago Composers Forum, and many more. In 2008 and 2009, PFF collaborated with the International Beethoven Project to present the world premiere of a rediscovered Beethoven piano trio performed by the Beethoven Project Trio. The PianoForte Foundation was honored with the 2009 William Hall Sherwood Award for Outstanding Contributions to the Arts, for its role in bringing awareness and appreciation of piano repertoire and performance in Chicago.
