= Sarabande and Chaconne from Handel's Almira (Liszt) =

Composition for piano by Franz Liszt

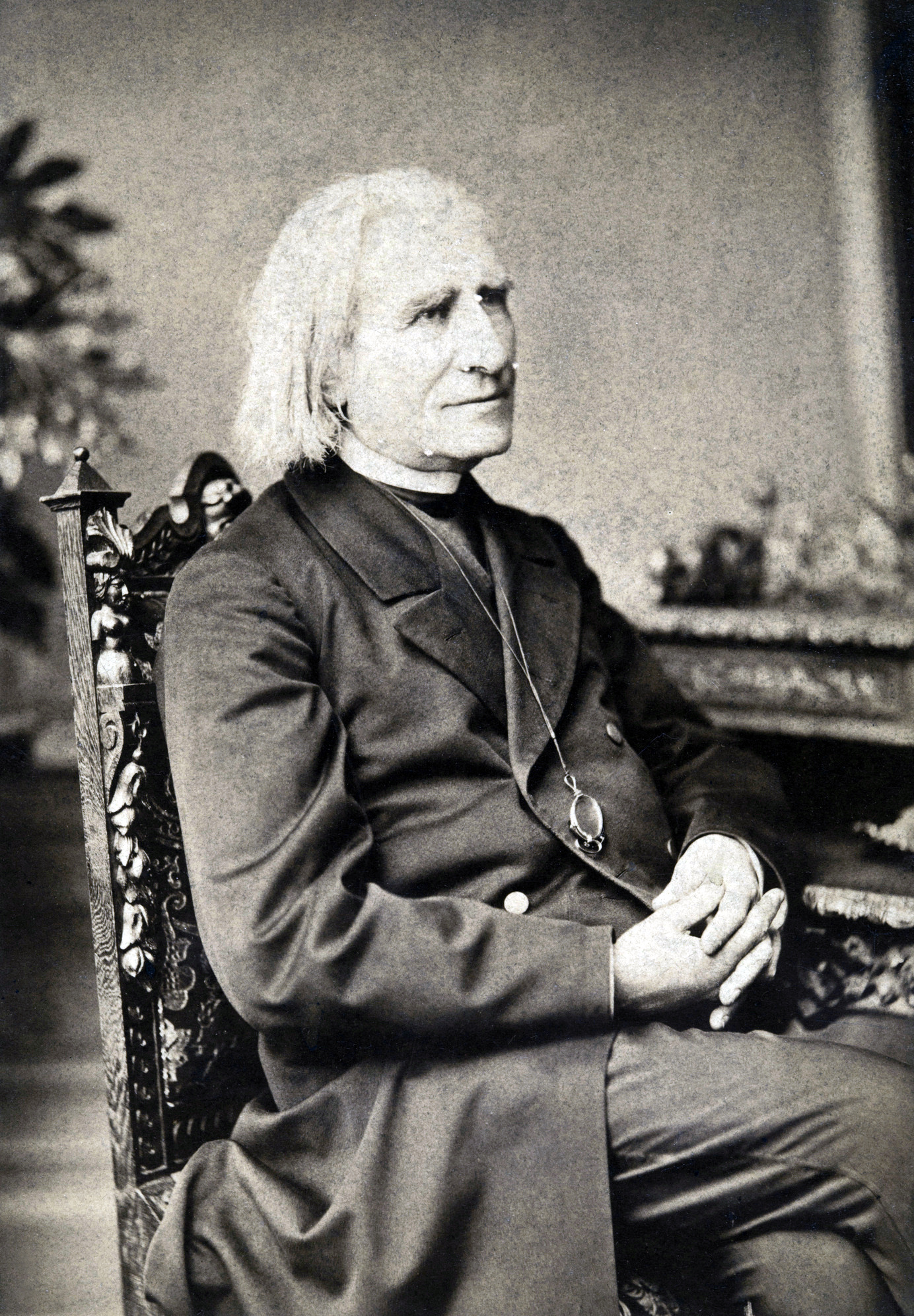
Franz Liszt by Friedrich Hertel, July 1876

Franz Liszt composed his transcription of the Sarabande and Chaconne from Handel's opera Almira for piano solo (S.181) in 1879 for his English piano student Walter Bache to play at a Handel festival in England. The Almira transcription is noted by critics as one of the most striking of Liszt's late concert arrangements as well as his only setting of a baroque piece from his late period.

Liszt's decision to set Handel was probably due at least in part to please British audiences, for whom Handel was still the preeminent national composer and before whom Bache would likely appear. Nevertheless, the choice of subject matter was surprising, not only by being Handel instead of Bach but also from being taken from a Handel opera which was virtually ignored at the time.

In his most recent baroque transcription prior to Almira, that of Bach's Fantasie and Fugue in G minor, BWV 542 dating from 1867, Liszt follows the original almost exactly. With Almira, Liszt deviates considerably. While retaining the original contour of Handel's melodies, he changes the order of dances (in the opera the chaconne is followed by the sarabande), then adds introductory, transitional and developmental material along with his own varied treatment of the dances themselves.

The result of Liszt's work is a highly unified double-set of variations — one set of variations on the sarabande followed by a separate set on the chaconne — nearly becoming an independent work in the process. (Humphrey Searle in fact catalogued the work as an independent composition.) The sarabande dominates the piece, functioning much like a Bach chaconne as variations on a harmonic progression, while the chaconne itself is of the balletic variety, having nothing to do with the repeated bass lines of the work. This work is said by some to anticipate Ferruccio Busoni's late-romantic settings of Bach in its overall grandeur, especially in the major key transformation of the sarabande at the work's conclusion.
