= Mephisto Polka =

Composition for piano by Franz Liszt

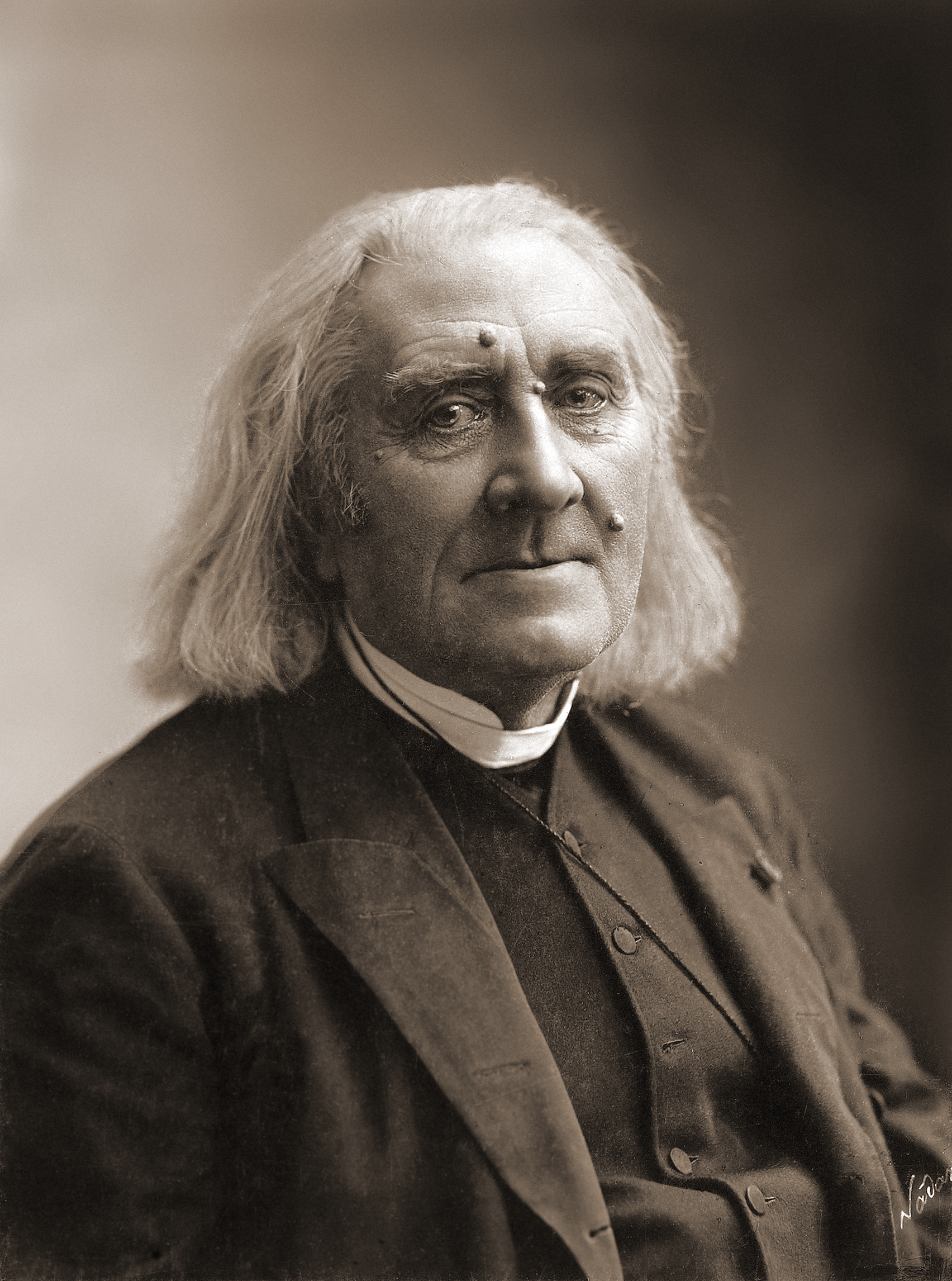
Franz Liszt in March 1886, photographed by Nadar

The Mephisto Polka (S. 217) is a piece of program music written in folk-dance style for solo piano by Franz Liszt in 1882–83. The work's program is the same as that of the same composer's four Mephisto Waltzes, written respectively in 1859–60, 1880–81, 1882 and 1885 and based on the legend of Faust, not by Goethe but by Nikolaus Lenau (1802–50). The following program note, which Liszt took from Lenau, appears in the printed score of the Mephisto Waltz No. 1:

There is a wedding feast in progress in the village inn, with music, dancing, carousing. Mephistopheles and Faust pass by, and Mephistopheles induces Faust to enter and take part in the festivities. Mephistopheles snatches the fiddle from the hands of a lethargic fiddler and draws from it indescribably seductive and intoxicating strains. The amorous Faust whirls about with a full-blooded village beauty in a wild dance; they waltz in mad abandon out of the room, into the open, away into the woods. The sounds of the fiddle grow softer and softer, and the nightingale warbles his love-laden song.

The first recording of this piece was by France Clidat in her traversal of Liszt's works for Decca.

== Dedication ==
The Mephisto Polka was dedicated to Lina Schmalhausen, one of Liszt's "inner-circle" piano students. However, she is remembered more as one among the closest and most ardently devoted of Liszt's followers, frequently attending to and assisting in the many needs of the aged master whose health was in rapid decline.

== Form ==
This work appears the simplest and technically least challenging of all the Mephisto dances; except for the Bagatelle sans tonalité, it is also the shortest. Tonally, it is also mildest and can appear to be a fully tonal composition, with chromaticism limited to neighboring-tone and chordal sonority varieties. These passages are usually realized on the left hand in chordal or arpeggiated figures. However, the simplicity in notation disguises the true character of the music. There is no functional harmony to clearly create the relational behavior of tonic, dominant, and subdominant harmonic functions. If anything, the general impression of the music is modal, with the piece constantly in flux. Any suggested tonality is quickly undermined by the following sonority, which may in turn vaguely (and now even more weakly) suggest another tonal focus. The most haunting touch is at the end, when the piece simply stops without explanation, with a solitary F natural above middle C sounding, then dying out.

== See also ==
- Bagatelle sans tonalité
- Mephisto Waltzes

== Bibliography ==
- ed. Ewen, David, The Complete Book of Classical Music (Englewood Cliffs, New Jersey: Prentice-Hall, Inc., 1965). Library of Congress Catalog Card Number 65-11033
- ed. Hamilton, Kenneth, The Cambridge Companion to Liszt (Cambridge and New York: Cambridge University Press, 2005). ISBN 0-521-64462-3 (paperback).
  - Baker, James M., "A survey of the late piano works"
  - Hamilton, Kenneth, "Early and Weimar piano works"
- Howard, Leslie, Notes for Hyperion CDA66201, Liszt Waltzes, Leslie Howard, piano.
- Howard, Leslie, Notes for Hyperion CDA68011/2, Liszt Dances and Marches, Leslie Howard, piano.
- Walker, Alan, Liszt: The Final Years, 1861-1886 (Cornell University Press, 1997).
- Searle, Humphrey, ed. Stankey Sadie, "Liszt, Franz," The New Grove Dictionary of Music and Musicians, 20 vols. (London: MacMillan, 1980). ISBN 0-333-23111-2.
- Searle, Humphrey, "Liszt's Final Period," Oxford Journals 1 April 1952.
