= Mephisto Waltzes =

Four waltzes by Franz Liszt

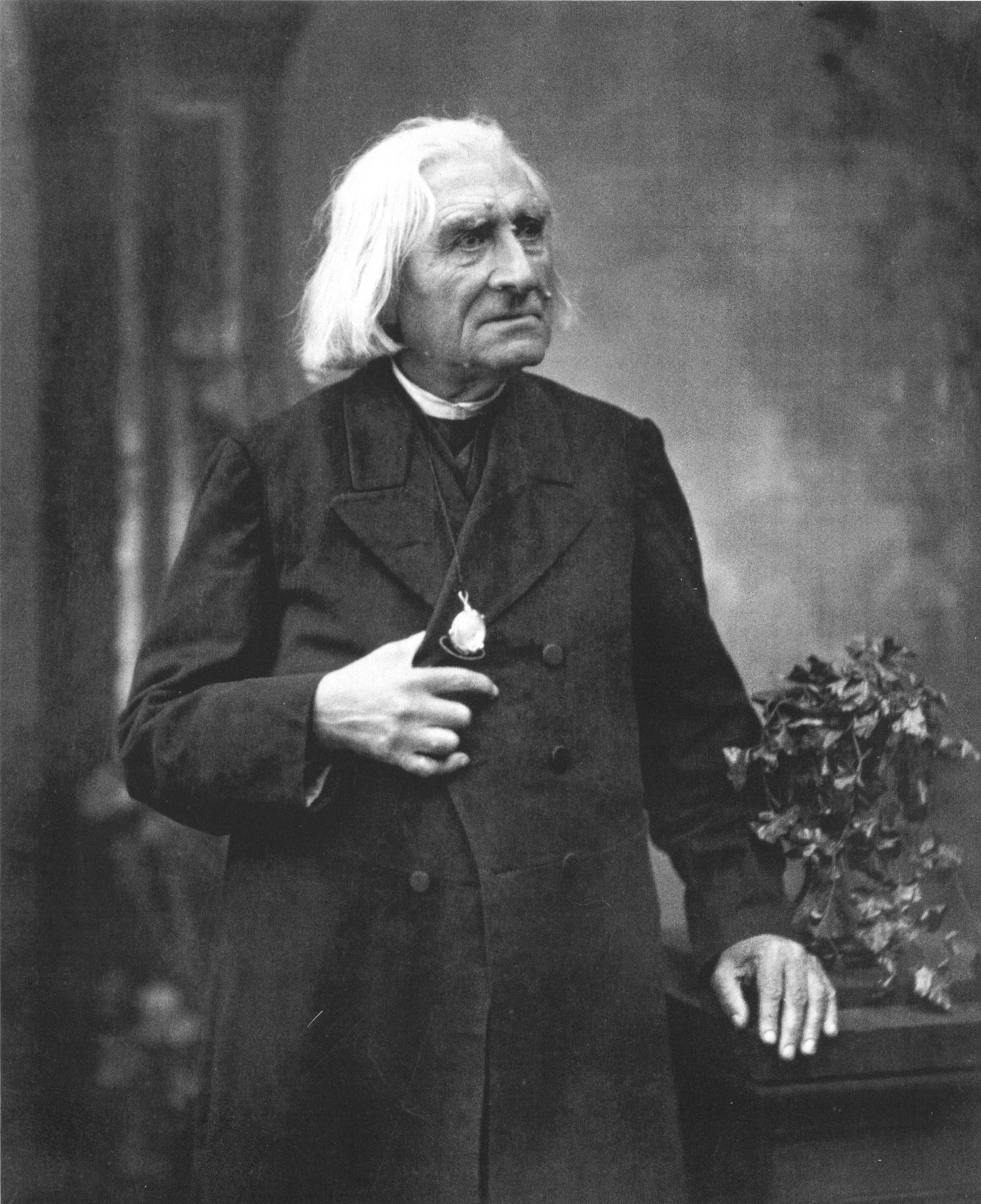
Franz Liszt in 1884

The Mephisto Waltzes (German: Mephisto-Walzer) are four waltzes composed by Franz Liszt from 1859 to 1862, from 1880 to 1881, and in 1883 and 1885. Nos. 1 and 2 were composed for orchestra, and later arranged for piano, piano duet and two pianos, whereas nos. 3 and 4 were written for piano only. Of the four, the first is the most popular and has been frequently performed in concert and recorded.

Associated with the Mephisto Waltzes is the Mephisto Polka, which follows the same program as the other Mephisto works.

== The Waltzes ==
=== No. 1, S.514 ===
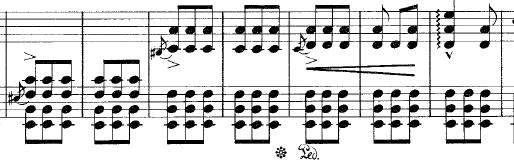
Excerpt from the beginning of the Mephisto Waltz No. 1

Mephisto Waltz No. 1
Live 2017 performance
By Giorgi Latso (Latsabidze)

Performed by Kristian Cvetković

The most popular of the series and, along with the third Waltz, most praised musically, the Der Tanz in der Dorfschenke: Erster Mephisto-Walzer ("The Dance in the Village Inn: First Mephisto-Waltz"), or the First Mephisto Waltz, is the second of two short works he wrote for orchestra under the title Zwei Episoden aus Lenaus Faust. While the work preceding it, Midnight Procession (Der nächtliche Zug), is rarely given (though both works have been recorded together), the waltz has been a concert favorite, with its passion, sensuality and dramatics generating an emotional impact. James Huneker described the work's "langourous syncopated melody" as "one of the most voluptuous episodes outside of the Tristan score".

The first Mephisto Waltz is a typical example of program music, taking for its program an episode from Nikolaus Lenau's 1836 verse drama Faust (not from Goethe's Faust). The following program note, which Liszt took from Lenau, appears in the printed score:

There is a wedding feast in progress in the village inn, with music, dancing, carousing. Mephistopheles and Faust pass by, and Mephistopheles induces Faust to enter and take part in the festivities. Mephistopheles snatches the fiddle from the hands of a lethargic fiddler and draws from it indescribably seductive and intoxicating strains. The amorous Faust whirls about with a full-blooded village beauty in a wild dance; they waltz in mad, abandon out of the room, into the open, away into the woods. The sounds of the fiddle grow softer and softer, and the nightingale warbles his love-laden song.

Liszt intended to publish the Waltz simultaneously with the Night Procession: "...The publication of the two Lenau's Faust episodes... I entrust to Schuberth's own judgement; as to whether the piano version or the score appears first, makes no difference to me; the only important thing is that both pieces should appear simultaneously, the Night Procession as No.1 and the Mephisto Waltz as No.2. There is naturally no thematic relationship between the two pieces; but they are related nonetheless by all the contrasts of emotions. A Mephisto of this kind may only arise from such a poodle!..." Liszt's request was not fulfilled and the two episodes were published separately.

The waltz was conceived as both an orchestra and a piano work. Three versions, orchestral (S.110/2), piano duet (S.599/2) and piano solo, (S.514), all date more or less from the same period (1859–62). The piano duet version is a straightforward transcription of the orchestral version, while the solo piano version is an independent composition. Liszt dedicated the piece to Karl Tausig, his favourite pupil. A further two piano version, published by Schuberth in 1885, was arranged by Dr. Fritz Stade and later revised by Isidor Philipp.

The orchestral version also has an alternate, softer ending which, while not as rousing as the usual coda, some critics argue is closer to the intent of Lenau's tale. While this ending is not often heard in the concert hall, both Fritz Reiner and James Conlon have recorded it. Liszt also provided two extra passages for the piano solo version. It is not known when Liszt wrote these extra passages, but it was a habit of his later years to make alterations while teaching his works to his pupils.

=== No. 2, S.515 ===
The Second Mephisto Waltz, S.515, followed the first by some 20 years. Its composition took place between late 1880 and early 1881. Liszt wrote the orchestral version (S.111) first, then based both the piano solo (S.515) and four-hand (S.600) versions on it. The orchestral version was premiered in Budapest in 1881. After this performance Liszt extended the work and changed the ending radically. The printed music for all three versions is based on this revision and is dedicated to Camille Saint-Saëns.

Harmonically, the second waltz anticipates Scriabin, Busoni and Bartók. Liszt begins and ends the work with an unresolved tritone, a musical interval famous as representing the devil in music, and the music overall is more violently expressive than both its predecessor and Camille Saint-Saëns' Danse macabre, which Liszt had transcribed a few years earlier. The piece, for all its dissonance, remains firmly in E♭ major until the B–F tritone shatters the work's climax at the piece's end. This gesture leaves the work's ending unresolved harmonically.

=== No. 3, S.215a and S.216 ===
Composed in 1883, the Third Mephisto Waltz, S.216, takes the harmonic language even further, featuring chords built up by fourths with numerous passages of descending minor triads whose roots are a semitone apart. The chord on which these progressions are based, according to Alan Walker, "is difficult to explain in terms of traditional harmony. It is best regarded as a 'fourths' chord in its last inversion." Tonally, the music is pulled between F♯ major, D minor and D♯ minor. As in its predecessors, the Third Waltz has the devil dancing in triple time while other groups of three move past so quickly that a larger rhythm of four is established, and triple time is abandoned altogether in the dreamlike passage near the work's conclusion. Humphrey Searle, in his book The Music of Liszt, considers this piece to be one of Liszt's finest achievements.

This waltz bore no dedication initially. After French pianist Marie Jaëll played the work for the composer (who asked her to repeat certain passages over and over again), he made extensive changes to the work and dedicated it to her. Saint-Saëns, Jaëll's composition teacher at the Paris Conservatoire (who also dedicated his first piano concerto to her), commented about her interpretation of Liszt's works that "only one person in the world [besides Liszt] who can play Liszt—Marie Jaëll". Liszt made no orchestral version of the piece. However, British composer and arranger Gordon Jacob orchestrated this along with other late works of Liszt for the Sadlers Wells ballet Apparitions, a project conceived by composer Constant Lambert.

The first recording of this piece was by France Clidat in her traversal of Liszt's works for Decca.

=== No. 4, S.216b ===
The Fourth Mephisto Waltz, S.696, remained unfinished and was not published until 1955. Liszt worked on the piece in 1885. Like the second waltz, the fourth uses an introduction and coda which do not stick to the basic key. While the work is mainly in D major, it begins and ends in C♯ minor. This, writes noted Australian Liszt scholar and pianist Leslie Howard, was an encouragement while working on his performing version to refer to the main material in the slow Andantino and to recapitulate a portion of the fast Allegro before Liszt's coda. Some critics do not consider this waltz as original as its predecessors and surmise that, had Liszt lived to complete it, he might have made considerable improvements. No orchestral version of this waltz was made by Liszt.

Despite its being unfinished, this waltz is still considered playable. It is usually performed in a version (S.216b) combining the completed fast outer sections, omitting the incomplete slow middle section. Howard made a performing version of this waltz in 1978 which utilizes a middle section assembled from Liszt's manuscript sources, completed in line with the composer's late style and with a minimum number of added notes from Howard. A recording of this completion is available on Hyperion's "Complete Piano Music of Liszt" series, while the sheet music, dedicated to Alfred Brendel, has been published by Basil Ramsey, and once again in 1988 by Orpheus Publications. However, the first recording of a version of this piece was by France Clidat in her traversal of Liszt's works for Decca.

== Bagatelle sans tonalité ==
The Bagatelle sans tonalité ("Bagatelle without tonality"; German: Bagatelle ohne Tonart), S. 216a, is sometimes included with Liszt's Mephisto Waltzes. The manuscript bears the title "Fourth Mephisto Waltz" and may have been intended to replace the Fourth Mephisto Waltz when it appeared Liszt might not be able to finish it. Critics point out the similarity in tonal center between these two pieces (D major) as confirmation of their composition shortly after one other in 1885 as well as Liszt's initial intent with the "Bagatelle".

== Legacy ==
The pieces are referenced as the title of the 1969 novel The Mephisto Waltz by American author and Juilliard-trained pianist Fred Mustard Stewart. Composer Jerry Goldsmith incorporated the pieces into his score for the 1971 film of the same name based on Stewart's novel.
