= Bagatelle sans tonalité =

Composition for piano by Franz Liszt

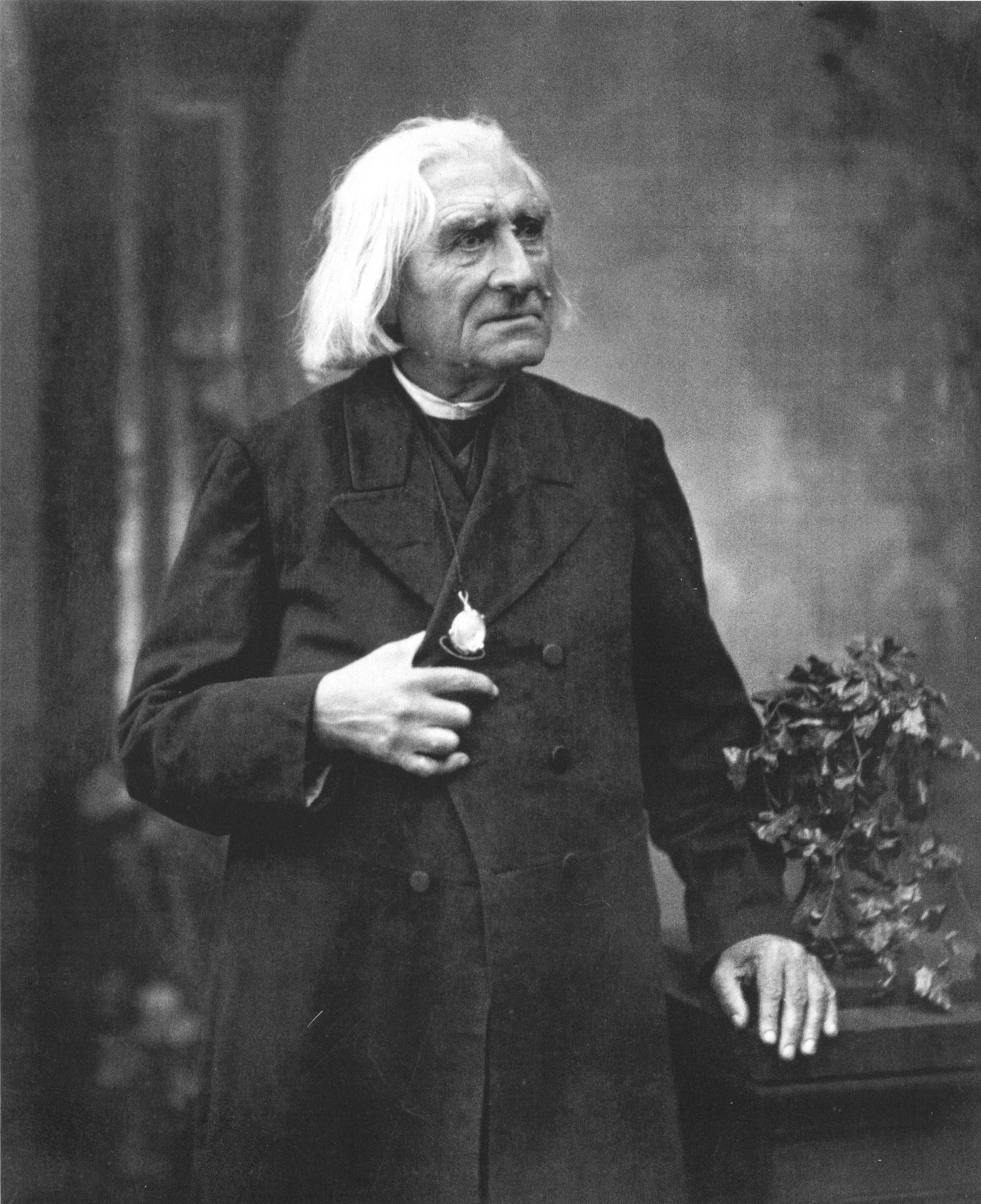
Franz Liszt in 1884

Bagatelle sans tonalité ("Bagatelle without tonality", S.216a) is a piece for solo piano written by Franz Liszt in 1885. The manuscript bears the title "Fourth Mephisto Waltz" and may have been intended to replace the piece now known as the Fourth Mephisto Waltz when it appeared Liszt would not be able to finish it; the phrase Bagatelle ohne Tonart actually appears as a subtitle on the front page of the manuscript.

The Bagatelle is a waltz in a typical sectioned dance form, with repeated sections given inventive variation. While this piece is not especially dissonant, it is extremely chromatic, becoming what Liszt's contemporary François-Joseph Fétis called "omnitonic" in that it lacks any definite feeling for a tonal center. Some critics have suggested, however, that the various underpinnings of the piece—in other words, the main bass notes and melodic elements—work together to imply an underlying tonality of D, which would link the Bagatelle in terms of tonality with the Fourth Mephisto Waltz.

== Overview ==
=== Program ===
The Bagatelle, like the Mephisto Waltzes, could be considered a typical example of program music, taking for its program an episode from Faust, not by Goethe but by Nikolaus Lenau (1802–1850). The following program note, which Liszt took from Lenau, appears in the printed score of the Mephisto Waltz No. 1:

There is a wedding feast in progress in the village inn, with music, dancing, carousing. Mephistopheles and Faust pass by, and Mephistopheles induces Faust to enter and take part in the festivities. Mephistopheles snatches the fiddle from the hands of a lethargic fiddler and draws from it indescribably seductive and intoxicating strains. The amorous Faust whirls about with a full-blooded village beauty in a wild dance; they waltz in mad abandon out of the room, into the open, away into the woods. The sounds of the fiddle grow softer and softer, and the nightingale warbles his love-laden song."

=== Form ===
Written in waltz form, the Bagatelle remains one of Liszt's most adventurous experiments in pushing beyond the bounds of tonality, concluding with an upward rush of diminished sevenths. Some have analyzed the piece as being constructed around a symmetrical chord—the G♯ diminished chord with which the work ends—with the B–F tritone symbolizing Mephistopheles as part of this chord. The lack of a definite key feeling, these critics continue, is due to the piece's reliance on mainly tritone and diminished seventh harmony, as well as the piece's ending in an indefinite manner.

The main theme, marked Scherzando, alternates between F♯ and F♮, suggesting an oscillation traditional between major and minor modes. Consequently, the main elements of this melody, E and A, combine with C♯ in the bass to project what would traditionally be considered the dominant here.

A contrasting appassionato section contains a bass line of C♯–D–E♭–E–F, that conforms with a standard tonal progression in D minor. Moreover, the motivic activity between this bass line and the melodic features of the introduction strengthens the significance of D as a tonal center, overriding sectional contrasts. The second half of this work is basically a repeat of the first half with glittering variations based for the most part on the harmonic underpinning. The fact the Fourth Mephisto Waltz is written in D major confirms to some critics that Liszt may have intended this work to replace it and that it was indeed written in 1885.

=== Premiere and publication ===
Unlike the Third and Fourth Mephisto Waltzes, the Bagatelle received its premiere within Liszt's lifetime, by his pupil Hugo Mansfeldt in Weimar on June 10, 1885. Like the Fourth Mephisto Waltz, however, it was not published until 1955.

== See also ==
- Mephisto Waltzes
- Mephisto Polka

== Bibliography ==
- ed. Ewen, David, The complete book of classical music (Englewood Cliffs, New Jersey: Prentice-Hall, Inc., 1965). LCCN 65--11033
- ed. Hamilton, Kenneth, The Cambridge companion to Liszt (Cambridge and New York: Cambridge University Press, 2005). ISBN 0-521-64462-3 (paperback).
  - Baker, James M., "A survey of the late piano works"
  - Hamilton, Kenneth, "Early and Weimar piano works"
- Howard, Leslie, Notes for Hyperion CDA66201, Liszt Waltzes, Leslie Howard, piano.
- Walker, Alan, Liszt: The Final Years, 1861-1886 (Cornell University Press, 1997).
- Searle, Humphrey, ed. Stankey Sadie, "Liszt, Franz," The New Grove Dictionary of Music and Musicians, 20 vols. (London: Macmillan, 1980). ISBN 0-333-23111-2.
- Searle, Humphrey, The Music of Liszt, Second Revised Edition (New York: Dover Publications, Inc., 1966). Library of Congress Card Catalog Number 66-27581.
- Searle, Humphrey, "Liszt's Final Period," Oxford Journals 1 April 1952.
