= Lélio (Berlioz) =

Composition by Hector Berlioz

- Choral-symphonic music by Hector Berlioz
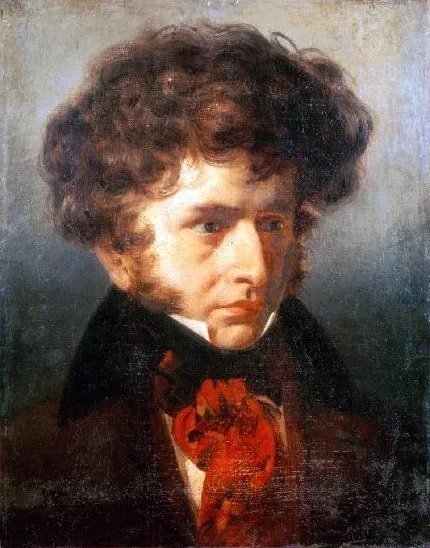
- Berlioz portrayed in 1832
- Opus: 14b
- Text: various poetry
- Language: French; Italian
- Performed: 9 December 1832
- Published: 1856
- Movements: six
- Scoring: narrator; tenor; baritone; chorus; orchestra; piano

Lélio, ou Le retour à la vie (English: Lélio, or the Return to Life), Op. 14b, is a work incorporating music and spoken text by the French composer Hector Berlioz, intended as a sequel to his Symphonie fantastique. It is written for a narrator, solo tenor and baritone, mixed chorus, and an orchestra including piano.

Composed in Italy in 1831 and initially performed at the Conservatoire de Paris on December 9, 1832, as Le retour à la vie, mélologue en six parties, Lélio incorporated pre-existing compositions. Upon Franz Liszt's solicitation, it underwent revision for a 1855 performance in Weimar and was published the subsequent year. David Cairns highlights Lélio for its unparalleled "immediate impact" within Berlioz's catalogue. Its early appeal, rooted in the fusion of Romantic aesthetics and the interplay between declamation and music, has, however, led to its perception as dated, thus its infrequent revival and recording in contemporary times.

== Overview ==
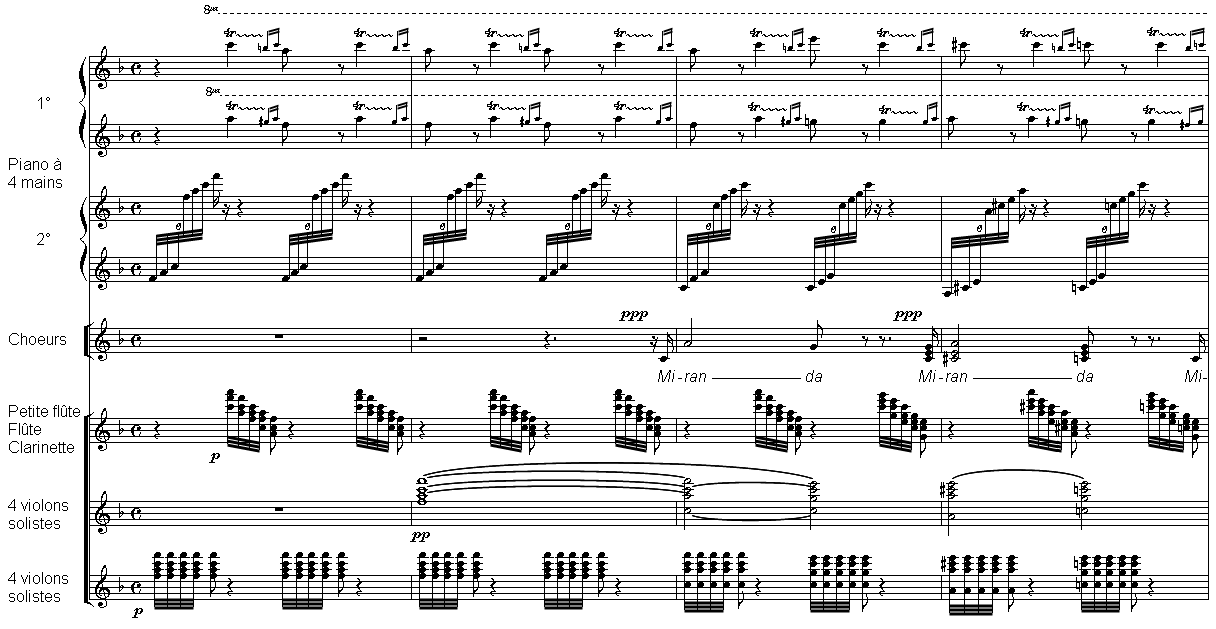
Opening bars of the sixth movement, showing the use of the piano as an orchestral instrument

Lélio is a kind of sequel to Symphonie fantastique and makes use of the famous idée fixe (the recurring musical theme symbolising the beloved) from that work. Both the symphony and Lélio were inspired by the composer's unhappy love affairs, the symphony by Harriet Smithson, Lélio by Marie Moke, who had broken off her engagement to Berlioz in order to marry Camille Pleyel, prompting the composer to contemplate suicide and triple homicide.

Lélio is a record of the composer overcoming his despair and "returning to life" via the consolations of music and literature. Berlioz later revised his intentions, making it seem as if both the symphony and Lélio were about Harriet Smithson (she later became his wife). The symphony uses programme music to describe a despairing artist trying to kill himself with an overdose of opium, leading to a series of increasingly terrifying visions. The programme of Lélio describes the artist wakening from these dreams, musing on William Shakespeare, his sad life, and not having a woman. He decides that if he can't put this unrequited love out of his head, he will immerse himself in music. He then leads an orchestra to a successful performance of one of his new compositions and the story ends peacefully.

Lélio consists of six musical pieces presented by an actor who stands on stage in front of a curtain concealing the orchestra, chorus and solo singers. The actor's dramatic monologues explain the meaning of the music in the life of the artist. The work begins and ends with the idée fixe theme, linking Lélio to the Symphonie fantastique.

== The music ==
The six movements are:

1. Le pêcheur – Ballade ("The Fisherman – Ballad")
  A setting of a translation of Goethe's ballad Der Fischer.
2. Choeur d'ombres (Chorus of Shades)
  An evocation of the ghostly atmosphere of Shakespeare's Hamlet, this piece reuses music from Berlioz's cantata La mort de Cléopâtre.
3. Chanson de brigands ("Brigands' Song")
  A celebration of the freedom of life enjoyed by outlaws in Calabria.
4. Chant de bonheur – Souvenirs ("Song of Happiness – Memories")
  A tenor hymn in praise of the artist's recovered happiness. The music was originally used in the cantata La mort d'Orphée (1827).
5. La harpe éolienne ("The Aeolian Harp")
  For orchestra alone, this is another reworking of music from the cantata La mort d'Orphée. The Aeolian harp was an important symbol of artistic inspiration in Romanticism.
6. Fantaisie sur la «Tempête» de Shakespeare ("Fantasy on Shakespeare's The Tempest")
  A piece of programme music based on Shakespeare's The Tempest for orchestra and chorus (singing in Italian). "The work marks the first appearance of the piano as an orchestral instrument. Berlioz, who rarely repeated himself, never made use of it again." (Cairns p. 382)

Instrumentation: 2 flutes (2nd also piccolo), 2 oboes (2nd also English horn), 2 clarinets, 4 bassoons 4 horns, 2 trumpets, 2 cornets, 3 trombones, ophicleide, timpani, bass drum, tam-tam, harp, piano (2 and 4 hand), strings

== Recordings ==
- Lambert Wilson (narrator), Montreal Symphony Orchestra, conducted by Charles Dutoit (Decca)
- Orchestre National de l'ORTF, conducted by Jean Martinon (EMI)
- Pierre Boulez Conducts Berlioz: Symphonie fantastique and Lélio
- Zdenek Macal, Milwaukee Symphony Orchestra and Chorus, Glenn Siebert (tenor), William Diana (baritone), Werner Klemperer (narrator, in English)
- London Symphony Orchestra, conducted by Pierre Boulez; recording in public domain
- Depardieu, Zeffiri, Ketelsen, CSO, Muti; recorded in 2010, released in 2015
- Jean-Philippe Lafont (narrator), Cyrille Dubois (tenor), Florian Sempey (baritone), Vienna Symphony, conducted by Philippe Jordan; recorded in 2018, released in 2019 (Sony)

== Sources ==
- David Cairns: Berlioz: The Making of an Artist (the first volume of his biography of the composer) (André Deutsch, 1989)
- Hugh Macdonald: Berlioz ("The Master Musicians", J.M.Dent, 1982)
- Berlioz: Memoirs (Dover, 1960)
- Booklet notes to the Dutoit recording
