= Idée fixe (psychology) =

Personal fixation

In psychology, an idée fixe (pronounced [ide fiks]; French for 'fixed idea') is a preoccupation of mind believed to be firmly resistant to any attempt to modify it, a fixation.

== Background ==
According to intellectual historian Jan E. Goldstein, the initial introduction of idée fixe as a medical term occurred around 1812 in connection with monomania. The French psychiatrist Jean-Étienne Dominique Esquirol considered an idée fixe – in other words an unhealthy fixation on a single object – to be the principal symptom of monomania. The term idée fixe had already seeped from psychiatric discourse into literary language before Hector Berlioz employed it in a musical context in his programmatic Symphonie fantastique (subtitled Episode in the Life of an Artist...) of 1830 to denote a recurring melodic theme that references the composer's own romantic obsession (or erotomania) with the actress Harriet Smithson. Especially around the 1820s and 1830s, the concepts of idée fixe and monomania became firmly associated with the Romantic movement in literature, and fixated protagonists feature in a variety of contemporary novels and plays, ranging from the serious to the almost humorous.

As originally employed in the nineteenth and early twentieth centuries, idée fixe described a more specific condition with respect to monomania (a term denoting a wider range of pathologies that did not stem only from a single fixation). A second difference is that the victim of idée fixe was understood to be unaware of the unreality of their frame of mind, while the victim of monomania might be aware. At that time, idée fixe was discussed as a form of neurosis or monomania. According to Goldstein, the original medical diagnosis of monomania "denoted an idée fixe, a single pathological preoccupation in an otherwise sound mind."

The idea of monomania as a diagnostic category was further developed by Esquirol in his work Des Malades Mentales (1839) and was coupled to the idée fixe by Wilhelm Griesinger (1845) who viewed "every single idée fixe [as] the expression of a deeply deranged psychic individuality and probably an indicator of an incipient form of mania".

The "pathologicalization" of political convictions was used to discredit political anarchists. The further historical evolution of idée fixe was much entangled with the introduction of psychologists into legal matters such as the insanity defense, and is found in a number of texts.

== Development of the concept ==
The concept of idées fixes has been expanded and refined by Emil Kraepelin (1904), Carl Wernicke (1906), and Karl Jaspers (1963), evolving into a concept of overvalued ideas. An overvalued idea is a false or exaggerated and sustained belief that is maintained with much less than delusional intensity (i.e., the individual is able to acknowledge the possibility that the ideas may not be true).

== Modern usage ==
In most contexts, idée fixe refers to an obsession or a passion one fixates on. However, the term also has a pathological dimension, denoting serious psychological issues. The pathology is what is denoted in psychology and law.

Idée fixe began as a parent category of obsession, and as a preoccupation of mind the idée fixe resembles today's obsessive–compulsive disorder (OCD). Although the afflicted person can think, reason and act like other people, they are unable to stop a particular train of thought or action. However, in obsessive–compulsive disorder, the person recognizes the absurdity of their obsession or compulsion, which may not be the case with an idée fixe (normally being a delusion). Today, the term idée fixe does not denote a specific disorder in psychology, and does not appear as a technical designation in the Diagnostic and Statistical Manual of Mental Disorders (DSM). It is still used as a descriptive term, appearing in dictionaries of psychology.

A form of idée fixe is a hobby horse or pet idea, which is an "obsessive avocation", where one dwells on or reverts to the same favorite topic.

== In literature ==
An example of an idée fixe is in Miguel de Cervantes' Don Quixote:

Don Quixote reveals his kinship to the most commonly encountered of Cervantes's character types: the head-in-clouds fantasist, obsessed by his idée fixe.

— Anthony J. Close, Miguel de Cervantes, Don Quixote

Although Herman Melville's Captain Ahab may come to mind as another famous example of idée fixe, and it is sometimes referred to this way, more often Ahab's obsession is referred to as monomania (the more inclusive term), and Melville himself does that. It would seem from the description of Ahab's possession that idée fixe applies quite accurately, as the following description suggests:

"Not one jot of his great natural intellect had perished." ... "Yielding up all his thoughts and fancies to his one supreme purpose", Ahab has let his mind's guiding and directing power be usurped by the "sheer inveteracy" of a will driven by "one unachieved revengeful desire"

— Quotes from Moby-Dick, pp. 990, 1007, Thomas Cooley, The ivory leg in the ebony cabinet: madness, race, and gender in Victorian America

However, what makes monomania the better term is that "Captain Ahab ... has an inkling of his true state of mind: 'my means are sane, my motive and my object mad.'"

The words idée fixe also occur explicitly: for example, in Arthur Conan Doyle's Sherlock Holmes:

There is the condition which the modern French psychologists have called the 'idée fixe', which may be trifling in character, and accompanied by complete sanity in every other way. A man might form such an idée fixe... and under its influence be capable of any fantastic outrage.

— Arthur Conan Doyle, The Return of Sherlock Holmes

and in Abraham B. Yehoshua's novel about the Mani family through six generations:

...I had begun to despair of his accursed idée fixe which devoured every other idée that it encountered...

— Abraham B. Yehoshua, Mr. Mani

and in the account of the war on terror by George W. Bush's counter-terrorism chief Richard A. Clarke:

Iraq was portrayed as the most dangerous thing in national security. It was an idée fixe, a rigid belief, received wisdom, a decision already made and one that no fact or event could derail.

— Richard A Clarke, Against All Enemies: Inside America's War on Terror

== Legal implications ==
Possibly the best example of the role of idée fixe in an insanity defense today is its use in identifying paranoid personality disorder.

A frequent manifestation of ... paranoid personality is the presence of an overvalued idea ... a fixed idea (idée fixe) ... which might seem reasonable both to the patient and to other people. However, it comes to dominate completely the person's thinking and life. ... It is quite distinct phenomenologically from both delusion and obsessional idea.

— Femi Oyebode, The expression of disordered personality

== See also ==
- Affect heuristic – Mental shortcut based on emotion
- Belief perseverance – Maintenance of a belief despite new information that firmly contradicts it
- Cognitive bias – Systematic pattern of deviation from norm or rationality in judgment
- Confirmation bias – Bias confirming existing attitudes
- Delusional disorder – Mental disorder featuring beliefs with inadequate grounding
- Extreme overvalued belief
- Extremely online – Phenomenon of over-engaging with Internet culture
- Fixation (psychology) – Concept in psychology
- Moral insanity – Obsolete term for type of mental disorder
- Obsessive–compulsive disorder – Mental disorder
- Personality disorder – Maladaptive patterns of behavior, cognition, and inner experience
- Psychosis – Abnormal condition of the mind
- Thought disorder – Disorder of thought form, content or stream
- Weak central coherence theory – Theory on autism
