= Symphony No. 1 (Schumann) =

1841 symphonic work composed by Robert Schumann

- Spring
- by Robert Schumann
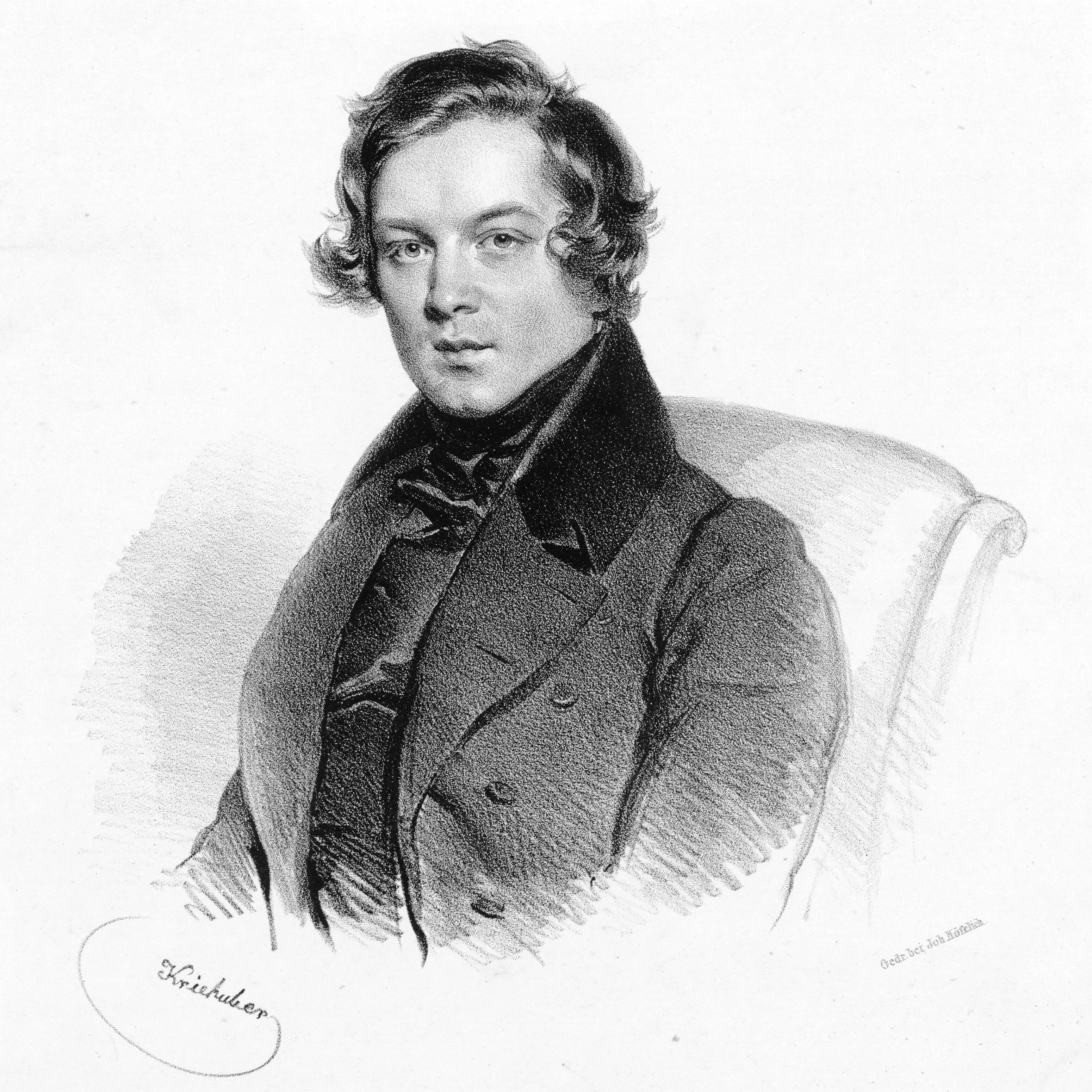
- Schumann, in an 1839 lithograph by Josef Kriehuber
- Key: B♭ major
- Opus: 38
- Composed: 23 January – 20 February 1841
- Dedication: Frederick Augustus II of Saxony
- Published: 1841 (ed. Breitkopf & Härtel)
- Duration: c. 30 minutes
- Movements: 4
- Scoring: Orchestra

Premiere
- Date: 31 March 1841
- Location: Leipzig
- Conductor: Felix Mendelssohn
- Performers: Leipzig Gewandhaus Orchestra

The Symphony No. 1 in B♭ major, Op. 38, also known as the Spring Symphony, is Robert Schumann's first completed symphonic work.

== Background ==
Although he had made some "symphonic attempts" in the autumn of 1840 soon after he married Clara Wieck, he did not compose his first symphony until early 1841. Until then, Schumann was largely known for his works for the piano and for voice. Clara encouraged him to write symphonic music, noting in her diary, "it would be best if he composed for orchestra; his imagination cannot find sufficient scope on the piano... His compositions are all orchestral in feeling... My highest wish is that he should compose for orchestra—that is his field! May I succeed in bringing him to it!"

Schumann sketched the symphony in four days from 23 to 26 January and completed the orchestration by 20 February. The premiere took place under the baton of Felix Mendelssohn on 31 March 1841 in Leipzig, where the symphony was warmly received. According to Clara's diary, the title "Spring Symphony" was bestowed upon it due to Adolf Böttger's poem Frühlingsgedicht. The symphony's opening has traditionally been associated with the closing lines of Böttger's poem, "O wende, wende deinen Lauf/Im Thale blüht der Frühling auf!" (“O, turn, O turn and change your course/In the valley, Spring blooms forth!"). This view has been challenged, and the call of a Leipzig nightwatchman has been mentioned as an alternative source.

In a letter to Wilhelm Taubert, Schumann wrote:

Could you breathe a little of the longing for spring into your orchestra as they play? That was what was most in my mind when I wrote [the symphony] in January 1841. I should like the very first trumpet entrance to sound as if it came from on high, like a summons to awakening. Further on in the introduction, I would like the music to suggest the world’s turning green, perhaps with a butterfly hovering in the air, and then, in the Allegro, to show how everything to do with spring is coming alive... These, however, are ideas that came into my mind only after I had completed the piece.

== Structure ==
External audio
- Performed by the Staatskapelle Dresden under Wolfgang Sawallisch
- I. Andante un poco maestoso
- II. Larghetto
- III. Scherzo (Molto vivace)
- IV. Allegro animato e grazioso

The symphony is scored for two flutes, two oboes, two clarinets, two bassoons, four horns, two trumpets, three trombones, timpani, triangle and strings. Schumann especially expanded the use of timpani in the symphony, using the unusual tuning of B♭, G♭, and F in the first movement, and D, A, and F in the third, at the suggestion of Schumann's cousin-in-law, Ernst Pfundt. It was the first major orchestral work of its style to require three timpani. Schumann made some revisions until the definitive full-score of the symphony was published in 1853. The playing time of the symphony is about 29–31 minutes, depending upon the interpretation.

The symphony has four movements:

1. Andante un poco maestoso – Allegro molto vivace (B♭ major)
2. Larghetto (E♭ major)
  There is no pause between the 2nd and 3rd movements, as the ending of the previous movement ends on the key of D major instead of E♭ major, creating a transition to the next movement.
3. Scherzo: Molto vivace (D minor) – Trio I: Molto piu vivace (D major) – Trio II (B♭ major) – Coda: Come sopra ma un poco più lento – Quasi presto – Meno presto (D major)
4. Allegro animato e grazioso (B♭ major)

Originally, each movement had its own title, with the first movement nicknamed "The Beginning of Spring", the second "Evening", the third "Merry Playmates", and the last "Spring in Full Bloom". However, Schumann withdrew the titles before publication. The first movement was described by the composer as a "summons to awakening", and "The vernal passion that sway men until they are very old, and which surprises them with each year." One scholar wrote that "If that makes this a kind of Last Judgment, then the rest of the symphony is a Garden of Heavenly Delights." The first trio of the third movement quotes motifs from the first movement. The last movement of the symphony also uses the final theme of Kreisleriana, and therefore recalls the romantic and fantastic inspiration of the composer's piano compositions.

== Selected discography ==
- Berliner Philharmoniker – Rafael Kubelík. Deutsche Grammophon, 1963.
- Berliner Philharmoniker – Herbert von Karajan. Deutsche Grammophon, 1972.
- Cleveland Orchestra – George Szell. CBS Records International, 1972.
- Staatskapelle Dresden – Wolfgang Sawallisch. His Master's Voice, 1973.
- Vienna Philharmonic – Leonard Bernstein. Deutsche Grammophon, 1985-1986.
- Orchestre Révolutionnaire et Romantique – Sir John Eliot Gardiner. Archiv, 1998.

On 4 January 2014 broadcast of BBC Radio 3's CD Review – Building a Library, music critic Erica Jeal surveyed recordings of the Symphony No. 1 and recommended the 2004 recording by the Tonhalle Orchestra Zurich, with David Zinman conducting, as the best available choice.
