= Symphonie fantastique =

Program symphony by Hector Berlioz

- Épisode de la vie d'un artiste… en cinq parties
- Symphony by Hector Berlioz
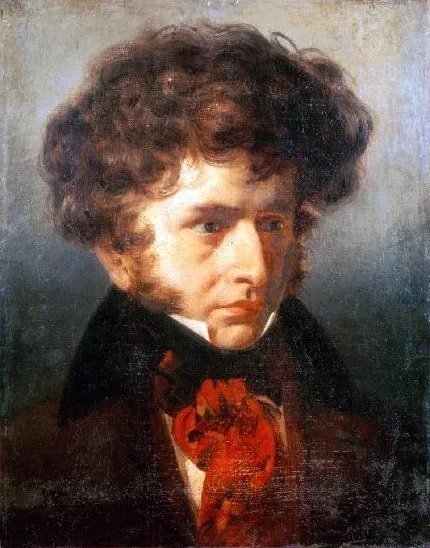
- Hector Berlioz
- Opus: 14
- Period: Romantic music
- Composed: 1830
- Dedication: Nicholas I of Russia
- Movements: Five

Premiere
- Date: 5 December 1830
- Location: Paris
- Conductor: François Habeneck

Symphonie fantastique: Épisode de la vie d'un artiste … en cinq parties (Fantastic Symphony: Episode in the Life of an Artist … in Five Sections) Op. 14, is a programmatic symphony written by Hector Berlioz in 1830. The first performance was at the Paris Conservatoire on 5 December 1830, conducted by François-Antoine Habeneck.

Berlioz wrote semi-autobiographical programme notes for the piece that allude to the Romantic sufferings of a gifted artist who has poisoned himself with opium because of his unrequited love for a beautiful and fascinating woman (in real life, the Shakespearean actress Harriet Smithson, who in 1833 married Berlioz). The composer, who revered Beethoven, followed the latter's unusual addition in the Pastoral Symphony of a fifth movement to the normal four of a classical symphony. The artist's reveries take him to a ball and to a pastoral scene in a field, which is interrupted by a hallucinatory march to the scaffold, leading to a grotesque satanic dance (Witches' Sabbath). Within each episode, the artist's passion is represented by a recurring theme called the idée fixe.

The symphony has long been a favourite with audiences and conductors. In 1831 Berlioz wrote a sequel, Lélio, for actor, soloists, chorus, piano and orchestra. Franz Liszt made a piano transcription of the score that was first recorded by Idil Biret in 1979.

== Overview ==
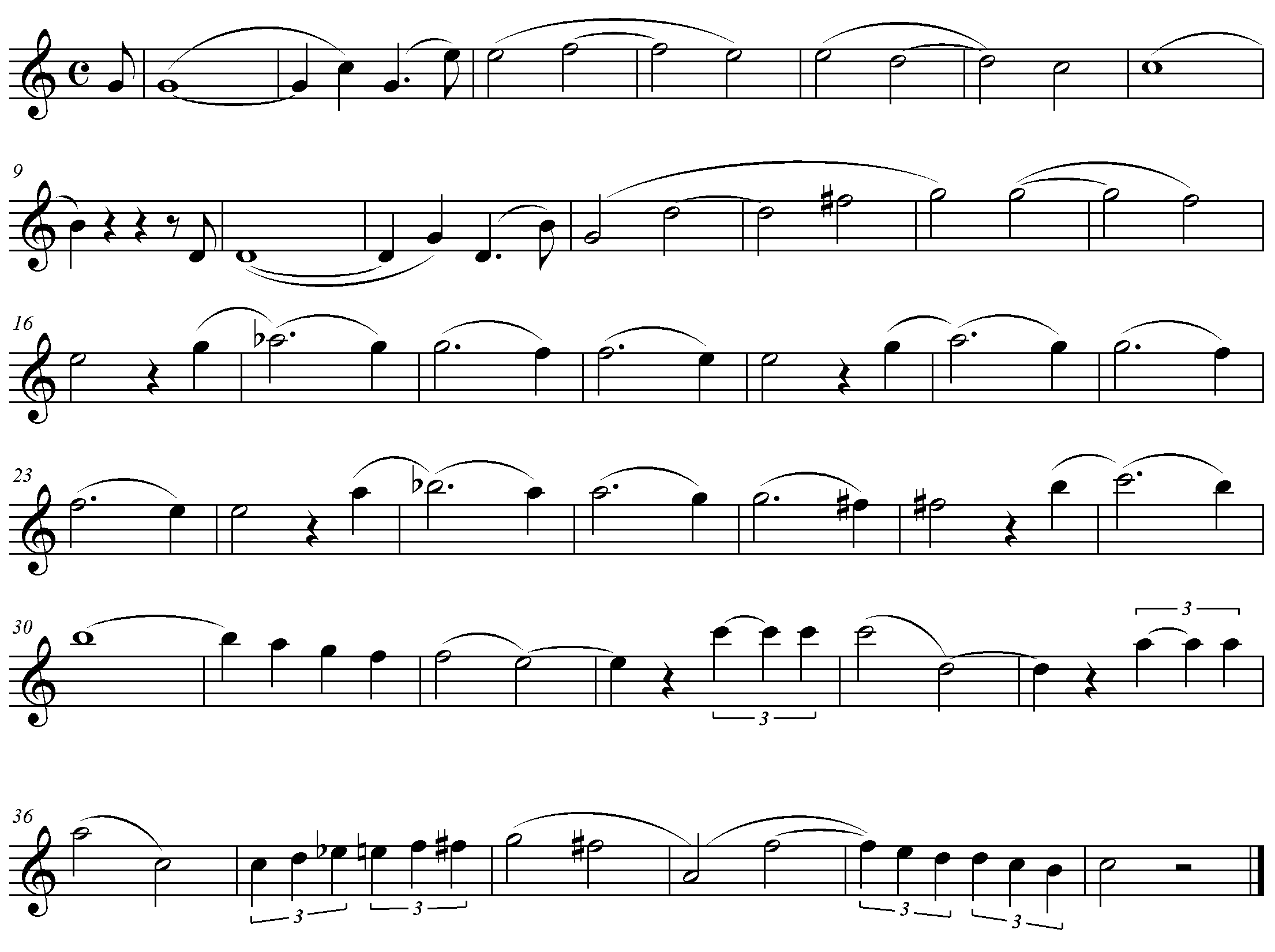
The idée fixe theme, which recurs in various guises in each of the five movements

The Symphonie fantastique is a piece of programme music that tells the story of a gifted artist who, in the depths of hopelessness and despair because of his unrequited love for a woman, has poisoned himself with opium. The symphony tells the story of the artist's drug-fuelled hallucinations, beginning with a ball and a scene in a field and ending with a march to the scaffold and a satanic dream. The artist's passion is represented by an elusive theme which Berlioz called the idée fixe, a contemporary medical term also found in literary works of the period. It is defined by the Dictionnaire de l'Académie française as "an idea that keeps coming back to mind, an obsessive preoccupation". (Note: idée qui revient sans cesse à l'esprit, préoccupation obsédante.)

Berlioz provided his own preface and programme notes for each movement of the work. They exist in two principal versions: one from 1845 in the first edition of the work and the second from 1855. These changes show how Berlioz downplayed the programmatic aspect of the piece later in life.

The first printing of the score, dedicated to Nicholas I of Russia, was published in 1845. In it, Berlioz writes:

The Composer's aim was to develop, in their musical aspects, different situations in the life of an artist. The plan of the instrumental drama, deprived of the aid of words, needs to be explained in advance. The following programme must therefore be considered as the spoken text of an Opera, serving to bring pieces of music the character and expression that motivates them.

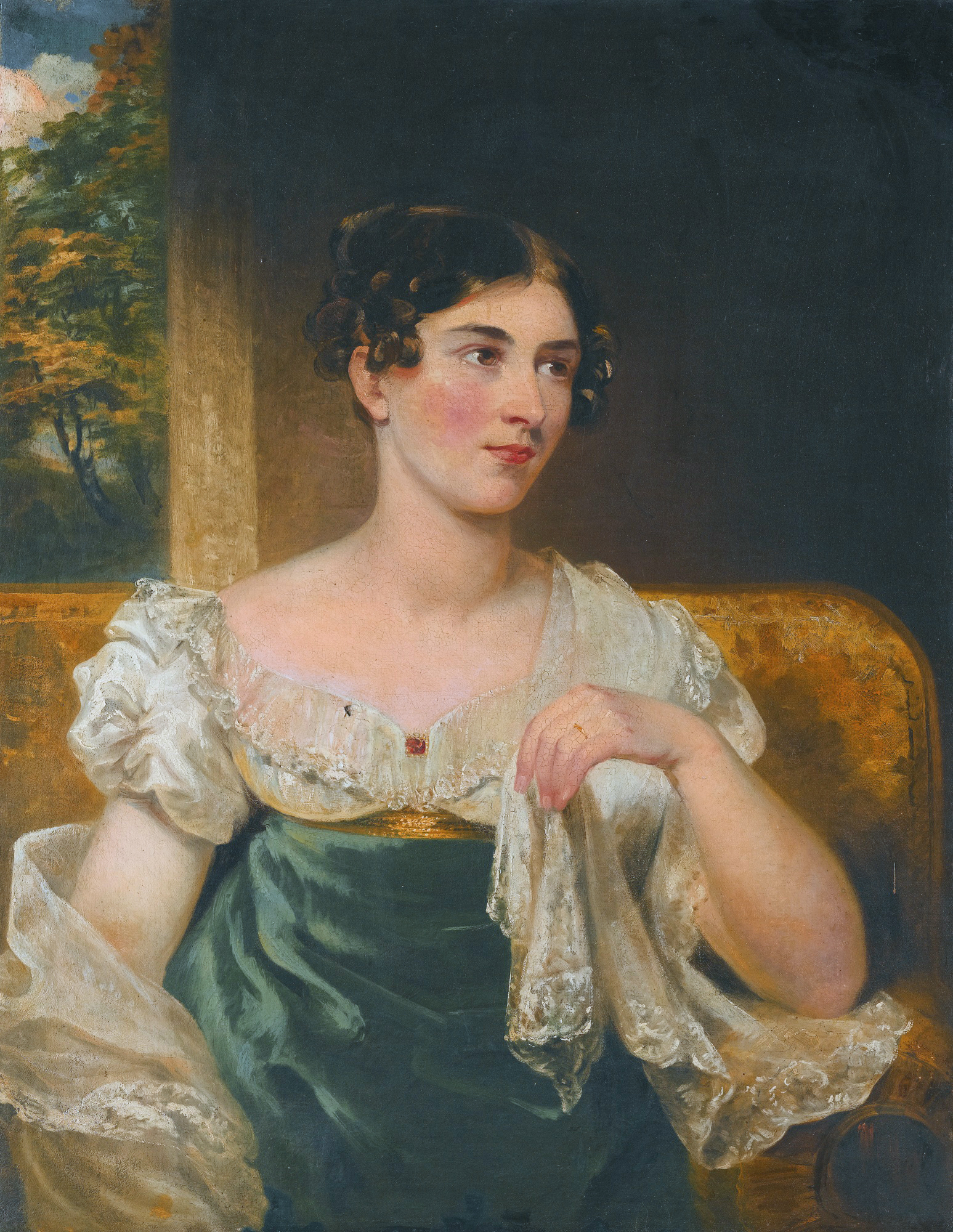
George Clint's portrait of Harriett Smithson, the inspiration for the symphony

In 1855 Berlioz writes:

The following programme must be distributed to the audience whenever the fantastic symphony is dramatically performed and followed, accordingly, by the monodrama of Lélio, which ends and completes the episode in the life of an artist. In such a case, the invisible orchestra is placed on the stage of a theatre behind the lowered curtain. If the symphony is performed in isolation in a concert, this arrangement is no longer necessary; it is even possible to dispense with distributing the programme, retaining only the title of the five movements. The author hopes that the symphony provides on its own sufficient musical interest independently of any dramatic intention.

Berlioz wanted people to understand his compositional intention, as the story he attached to each movement drove his musical choices. He said, "For this reason I generally find it extremely painful to hear my works conducted by someone other than myself."

=== Inspiration ===
Attending a performance of Shakespeare's Hamlet on 11 September 1827, Berlioz fell in love with the Irish actress Harriet Smithson, who played the role of Ophelia. His biographer Hugh Macdonald writes of Berlioz's "emotional derangement" in obsessively pursuing her, without success, for several years. She refused even to meet him. He sent her numerous love letters, all of which were unanswered.

The Symphonie fantastique reflects his obsession with Smithson. She did not attend the premiere, given at the Paris Conservatoire on 5 December 1830, but she heard Berlioz's revised version of the work in 1832 at a concert that also included its sequel, Lélio, which incorporates the same idée fixe and some spoken commentary. She finally appreciated the strength of his feelings for her. The two met shortly afterwards and began a romance that led to their marriage the following year.

== Instrumentation ==
The score calls for an orchestra of about 90 players:

Woodwinds
2 flutes (2nd doubling piccolo)
2 oboes (2nd doubling cor anglais) (in movement III, the first oboist plays briefly offstage)
2 clarinets in B♭, A, and C (1st doubling E♭ clarinet)
4 bassoons

Brass
4 horns
2 cornets
2 trumpets
3 trombones
2 ophicleides (Note: Modern performances commonly use tubas. Berlioz originally wrote for one serpent and one ophicleide, but switched to two of the latter.)

Percussion
4 timpani (played by two players in movements IV and V. Played by four in movement III)

cymbals
snare drum (used only in movement IV)
bass drum
bells in C and G (used only in movement V)

Strings
at least 6 harps (used only in movement II)

at least 15 1st violins
at least 15 2nd violins
at least 10 violas
at least 11 celli
at least 9 double basses

== Movements ==
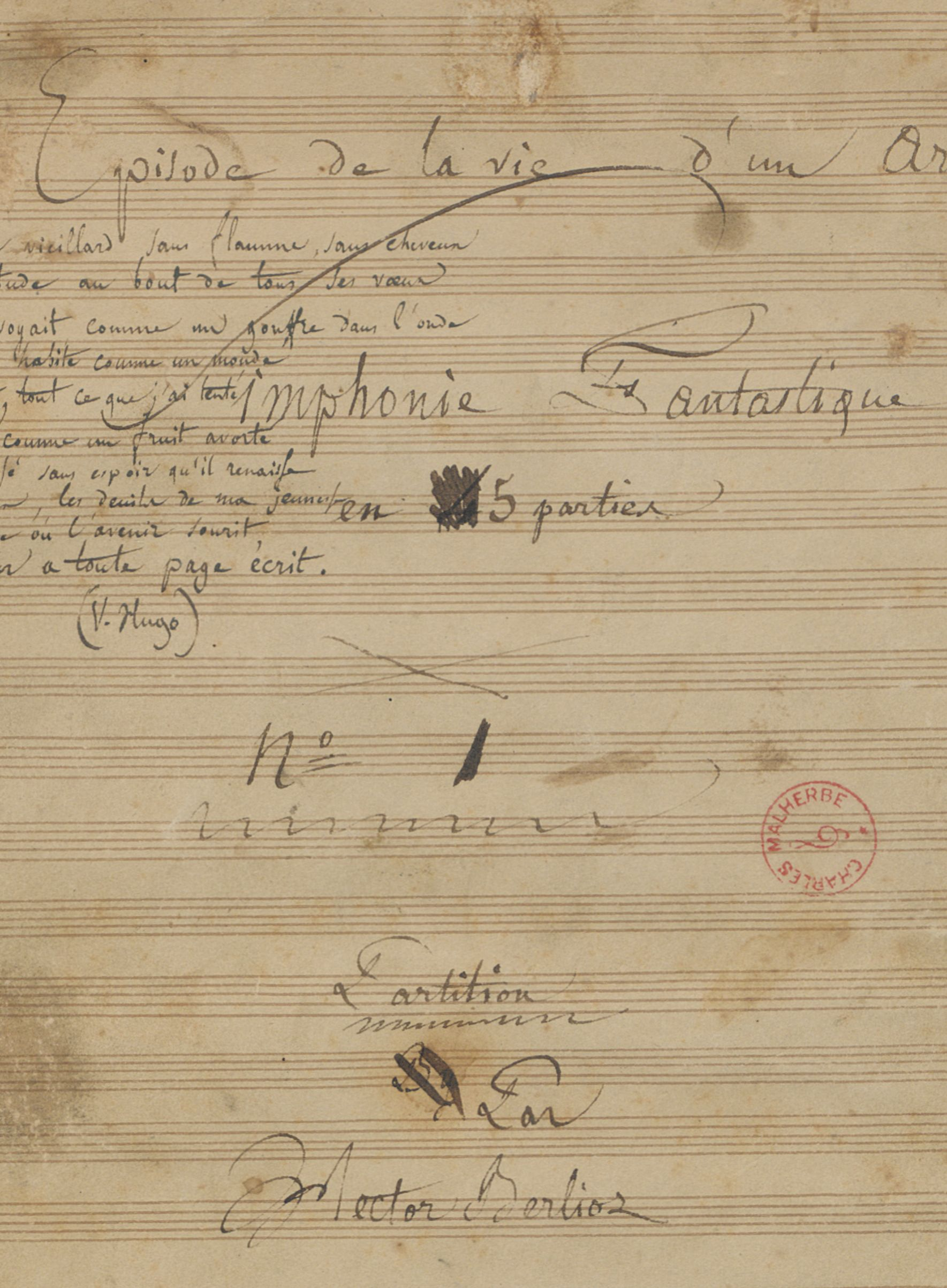
Title page of the manuscript score

Following the precedent of the Pastoral Symphony of Beethoven, whom Berlioz revered, the symphony has five movements, instead of four as was conventional for symphonies of the time.

1. "Rêveries – Passions" (Daydreams – passions) – C minor/C major
2. "Un bal" (A ball) – A major
3. "Scène aux champs" (Scene in the country) – F major
4. "Marche au supplice" (March to the scaffold) – G minor
5. "Songe d'une nuit du sabbat" (Dream of a night of the sabbath) – C minor/C major

Each movement depicts an episode in the protagonist's life that is described by Berlioz in the notes to the 1845 score. These notes are quoted (in italics) in each section below.

=== I. "Rêveries – Passions" (Daydreams – passions) ===
I. Rêveries – Passions
Performed by the Orchestre Lamoureux under Igor Markevitch, 1962.

The author imagines that a young musician, afflicted with that emotional affliction which a famous writer (Note: François-Rene de Chateaubriand, whose phrase vague des passions, variously translated as "wave of passions" or "intimation of passions", signifies "a quintessentially Romantic form of melancholy in which an imagination feeds on its own desires", "all that is indeterminate, not fixed on a concrete object, in human emotions.) calls the vague des passions, sees for the first time a woman who unites all the charms of the ideal being of which his imagination dreamed, and he becomes madly in love with her. By a singular oddity, the cherished image never presents itself to the artist's mind except in connection with a musical idea, in which he finds a certain passionate, but noble and timid character like that which he attributes to the beloved object.

This melodic reflection and its model pursue him incessantly like a double idée fixe. That is the reason for the constant appearance, in all the movements of the symphony, of the melody that begins the first allegro. The passage from this state of melancholic reverie, interrupted by a few fits of unprovoked joy, to that of a delirious passion, with its movements of fury, jealousy, returns of tenderness, tears, and religious consolations, is the subject of the first movement.

Structurally the movement derives from the traditional sonata form found in all classical symphonies. A long, slow introduction leads to an Allegro in which Berlioz introduces the idée fixe as the main theme of a sonata form comprising a short exposition followed by alternating sections of development and recapitulation. The idée fixe begins:

The theme was taken from Berlioz's scène lyrique "Herminie", composed in 1828.

=== II. "Un bal" (A ball) ===
II. Un bal
Performed by the Orchestre Lamoureux under Igor Markevitch, 1962.

The artist is placed in the most diverse circumstances of life, in the midst of the tumult of a festival, in the peaceful contemplation of the beauties of nature. But everywhere, in the city, in the fields, the cherished image comes to present itself to him and stirs up trouble in his soul.

The second movement is a waltz in 3/8. It begins with a mysterious introduction that creates an atmosphere of impending excitement, followed by a passage dominated by two harps; then the flowing waltz theme appears, derived from the idée fixe at first, then transforming it. More formal statements of the idée fixe twice interrupt the waltz.

The movement is the only one to feature the two harps. Another feature of the movement is that Berlioz added a part for solo cornet to his autograph score, although it was not included in the score published in his lifetime. It is believed to have been written for the virtuoso cornet player Jean-Baptiste Arban. The work has most often been played and recorded without the solo cornet part.

=== III. "Scène aux champs" (Scene in the country) ===
III. Scène aux champs
Performed by the Orchestre Lamoureux under Igor Markevitch, 1962.

One evening, finding himself in the country, he hears two shepherds playing a ranz des vaches on their pipes. This pastoral duet, the scenery, the slight rustling of the trees gently stirred by the wind, some hopes that he has lately found reason to conceive, all conspire to restore to his heart an unaccustomed calm, to give to his ideas a more cheerful colour. He reflects on his isolation; he hopes his loneliness will soon be over. But what if she betrays him!... This mixture of hope and fear, these ideas of happiness, disturbed by some dark forebodings, form the subject of the adagio. At the end, one of the shepherds resumes the ranz des vaches; the other no longer responds. Distant sound of thunder ... solitude ... silence...

The third movement is a slow movement, marked Adagio, in 6/8. The two shepherds mentioned in the programme notes are depicted by a cor anglais and an offstage oboe tossing an evocative melody back and forth. After the cor anglais–oboe conversation, the principal theme of the movement appears on solo flute and violins. It begins with:

Berlioz salvaged this theme from his abandoned Messe solennelle. The idée fixe returns in the middle of the movement, played by oboe and flute. The sound of distant thunder at the end of the movement is a striking passage for four timpani.

=== IV. "Marche au supplice" (March to the scaffold) ===
IV. Marche au supplice
Performed by the Orchestre Lamoureux under Igor Markevitch, 1962.

Having grown sure that his love is unappreciated, the artist poisons himself with opium. The dose of the narcotic, too small to kill him, plunges him into a sleep accompanied by the most horrible visions. He dreams that he has killed the one he loved, that he is condemned, that he is being led to execution, and that he is witnessing his own guillotining. The procession advances to the sounds of a march sometimes dark and fierce, sometimes brilliant and solemn, in which a muffled sound of heavy footsteps follows without transition the loudest outbursts. At the end of the march, the first four bars of the idée fixe reappear like a last thought of love interrupted by the fatal blow.

Berlioz claimed to have written the fourth movement in a single night, reconstructing music from an unfinished project, the opera Les francs-juges. The movement begins with timpani sextuplets in thirds, for which he directs: "The first quaver of each half-bar is to be played with two drumsticks, and the other five with the right hand drumsticks". The movement proceeds as a march filled with blaring horns and rushing passages, and scurrying figures that later show up in the last movement.

Before the musical depiction of his execution, there is a brief, nostalgic recollection of the idée fixe in a solo clarinet part, as though representing the last conscious thought of the soon-to-be-executed man.

=== V. "Songe d'une nuit du sabbat" (Dream of a night of the sabbath) ===
V. Songe d'une nuit du Sabbat
Performed by the Orchestre Lamoureux under Igor Markevitch, 1962.

He sees himself at a sabbath, in the middle of a horrible troop of ghosts, sorcerers, and monsters of all kinds gathered together for his funeral. Strange noises, moans, bursts of laughter, distant cries to which other cries seem to respond. The beloved melody reappears again, but it has lost its character of nobility and timidity; it is no more than a dance tune – ignoble, trivial and grotesque; it is she who is coming to the sabbath ... Roar of joy as she arrives ... She joins in the diabolical orgy. Funeral knell, burlesque parody of the Dies irae, witches' round dance. The round and the Dies irae together.

This movement can be divided into sections according to tempo changes:

- The introduction is Largo, in common time, creating an ominous quality through the copious use of diminished seventh chords, dynamic variations and instrumental effects, particularly in the strings (tremolos, pizzicato, sforzando).
- At bar 21, the tempo changes to Allegro and the metre to 6/8. The return of the idée fixe as a "vulgar dance tune" is depicted by the C clarinet. This is interrupted by an Allegro Assai section in cut time at bar 29.
- The idée fixe then returns as a prominent E♭ clarinet solo at bar 40, in 6/8 and Allegro. The E♭ clarinet contributes a brighter timbre than the C clarinet.
- At bar 80, there is one bar of alla breve, with descending crotchets in unison through the entire orchestra. Again in 6/8, this section sees the introduction of the bells (or Piano playing in Triple Octaves) and fragments of the "witches' round dance".
- The "Dies irae" begins at bar 127, the motif derived from the 13th-century Latin sequence. It is initially stated in unison between the unusual combination of four bassoons and two ophicleides. The key, C minor, allows the bassoons to render the theme at the bottom of their range.
- At bar 222, the "witches' round dance" motif is repeatedly stated in the strings, to be interrupted by three syncopated notes in the brass. This leads into the Ronde du Sabbat (Sabbath Round) at bar 241, where the motif is finally expressed in full.
- The Dies irae et Ronde du Sabbat Ensemble section is at bar 414.

There are a host of effects, including trilling in the woodwinds and col legno in the strings. The climactic finale combines the somber Dies Irae melody, now in A minor, with the fugue of the Ronde du Sabbat, building to a modulation into E♭ major, then chromatically into C major, ending on a C chord.

== Reception ==
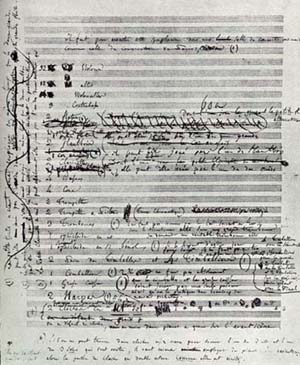
The opening page of Berlioz's autograph manuscript score

At the premiere of the Symphonie fantastique, there was protracted applause at the end, and the press reviews expressed both the shock and the pleasure the work had given. There were dissenting voices, such as that of Wilhelm Heinrich Riehl, the conservative author of the Musikalische Charakterköpfe, who regarded the work as an abomination for which Berlioz would suffer in Purgatory, but despite the striking unconventionality of the work, it was generally well received. François-Joseph Fétis, founder of the influential Revue musicale wrote of it approvingly, and Robert Schumann published an extensive, and broadly supportive analysis of the piece in the Neue Zeitschrift für Musik in 1835. He had reservations about "wild and bizarre" elements and some of the harmonies, but concluded: "in spite of an apparent formlessness, there is an inherent correct symmetrical order corresponding to the great dimensions of the work – and this besides the inner connection of thought". When the work was played in New York in 1865 critical opinion was divided: "We think the Philharmonic Society wasted much valuable time in the vain endeavor to make Berlioz's fantastic ravings intelligible to a sane audience" (New York Tribune); a rare treat, "a wonderful creation" (New York Daily Herald).

By the middle of the 20th century, the authors of The Record Guide, calling the work "one of the most remarkable outbursts of genius in the history of music", commented that it was a favourite with the public and with great conductors. Opinions differed about how much the symphony fitted the classical symphonic model. Sir Thomas Beecham, a lifelong proponent of Berlioz's music, remarked on the originality of the work, which "broke upon the world like some unaccountable effort of spontaneous generation which had dispensed with the machinery of normal parentage". A later conductor, Leonard Bernstein, said of the hallucinatory aspects of the work: "Berlioz tells it like it is ... You take a trip, you wind up screaming at your own funeral. Take a tip from Berlioz: that music is all you need for the wildest trip you can take, to hell and back." Others regard the work as more recognisably classical: Constant Lambert wrote of the symphony, "formally speaking it is among the finest of nineteenth century symphonies". The composer and musical scholar Wilfrid Mellers called the symphony "ostensibly autobiographical, yet fundamentally classical ... Far from being romantic rhapsodizing held together only by an outmoded literary commentary, the Symphonie fantastique is one of the most tautly disciplined works in early nineteenth-century music."

== Use in modern times ==
The main title sequence from Stanley Kubrick's film The Shining released in 1980, was scored by Wendy Carlos and Rachel Elkind. Within the title track is a reworking of the "Dies irae" section of Symphonie fantastique's fifth movement 'Songe D'une Nuit De Sabbat (Dreams of a Witches' Sabbath)'. Later, Zootopia 2 used this theme in a scene imitating The Shining.

The “Dies irae” traditional melody is translated from Latin as “day of wrath”. It is a somber chant dating back to the Middle Ages. The melody was originally used as part of funeral church services, usually as a sung mass for the dead. It has been used by composers to symbolise death, perhaps most prominently in Symphonie fantastique.

The fifth chapter, Dream of a Witches’ Sabbath were used in Kagaku Sentai Dynaman as background music during the 'monsters of the week' making process.

== Notes, references and sources ==
=== Sources ===
- Barzun, Jacques (1956) [1950]. Berlioz and His Century: An Introduction to the Age of Romanticism (2nd ed.). New York: Meridian Books. OCLC 458648636.
- Beecham, Thomas (1959) [1943]. A Mingled Chime. London: Hutchinson. OCLC 470511334.
- Bernstein, Leonard (1992). Young People's Concerts. New York: Anchor Books. ISBN 978-0-38-542435-6.
- Cairns, David (1969). "Hector Berlioz". In Robert Simpson (ed.). The Symphony: 1 – Haydn to Dvořák. London: Penguin. ISBN 978-0-14-020772-9.
- Cone, Edward T. (1971). Hector Berlioz: Fantastic Symphony. New York: Norton. OCLC 1150211779.
- Holoman, D. Kern (1989). Berlioz. London: Faber and Faber. ISBN 978-0-571-14235-4.
- Holoman, D. Kern (2000). "Performing Berlioz". In Peter Bloom (ed.). The Cambridge Companion to Berlioz. New York: Cambridge University Press. ISBN 978-0-52-159388-5.
- Lambert, Constant (1966). Music Ho! A Study of Music in Decline (third ed.). London: Faber. OCLC 4243993.
- Langford, Jeffrey (2000). "The Symphonies". In Peter Bloom (ed.). The Cambridge Companion to Berlioz. New York: Cambridge University Press. ISBN 978-0-52-159388-5.
- Macdonald, Hugh (1982). Berlioz. London: J. M. Dent. ISBN 978-0-46-003156-1.
- Mellers, Wilfrid (1957). The Sonata Principle. London: Rockliff. OCLC 2098112.
- Niecks, Frederick (June 1880). "Hector Berlioz and His Critics". The Musical Times. 21 (448): 272–274. doi:10.2307/3355690. JSTOR 3355690.
- O'Neal, Melinda (2019). Experiencing Berlioz: A Listener's Companion. Lanham: Rowman & Littlefield. ISBN 978-0-8108-8606-3.
- Rodgers, Stephen (2009). Form, Program, and Metaphor in the Music of Berlioz. Cambridge: Cambridge University Press. ISBN 978-0-52-188404-4.
- Sackville-West, Edward; Desmond Shawe-Taylor (1955). The Record Guide. London: Collins. OCLC 500373060.
- Schumann, Robert (1947). On Music and Musicians. London: Dennis Dobson. OCLC 6503404.
- Smethurst, Colin (1995). Chateaubriand: Atala and René. London: Grant & Cutler. ISBN 978-0-72-930384-2.
- Steinberg, Michael (1995). The Symphony: A Listener's Guide. Oxford: Oxford University Press. ISBN 978-0-19-506177-2.
