= Symphony No. 100 (Haydn) =

Eighth of the twelve London symphonies by Joseph Haydn

- Military
- by Joseph Haydn
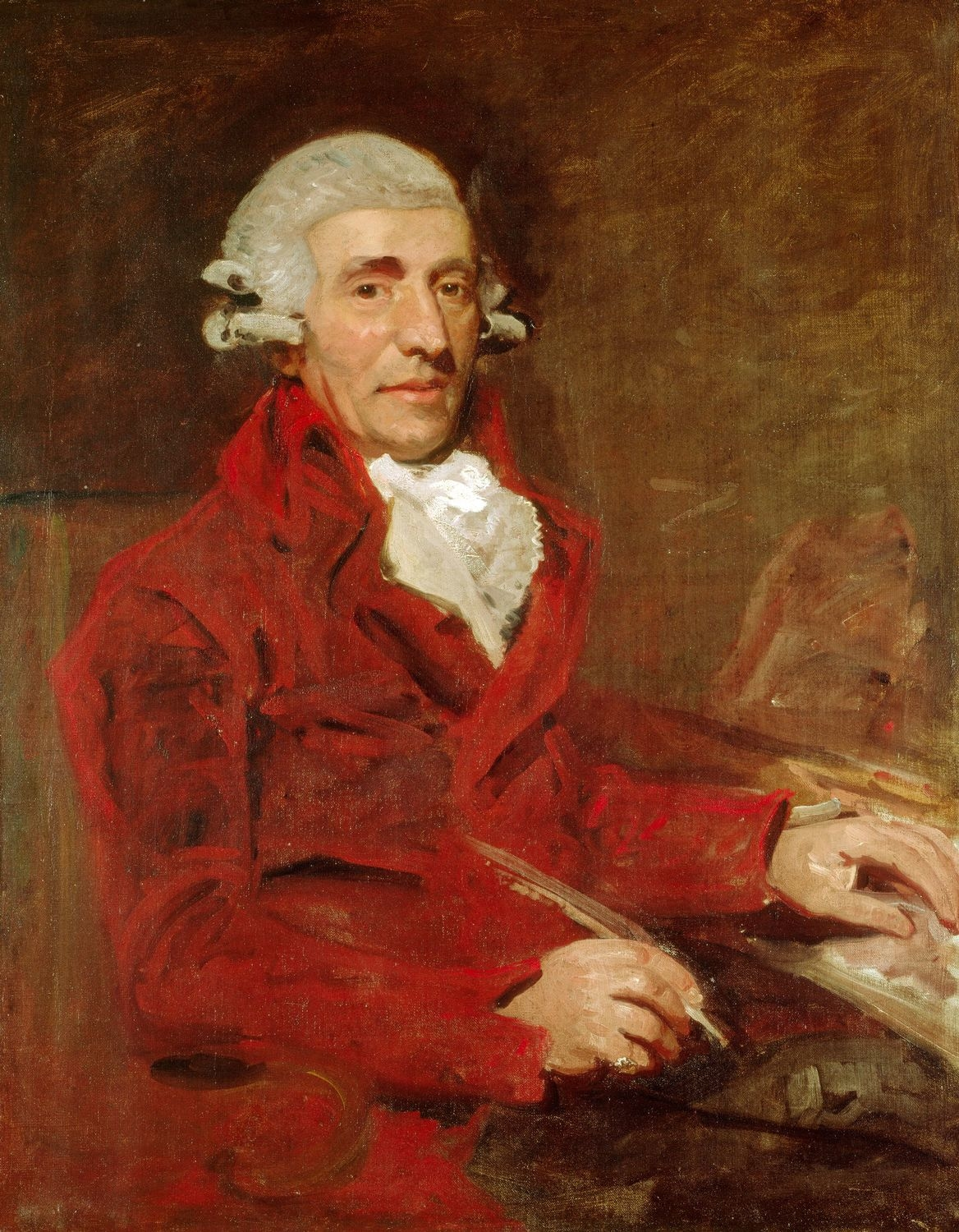
- Haydn in around 1792
- Key: G major
- Catalogue: Hob. I:100
- Composed: 1793-94
- Duration: c. 25 minutes
- Movements: 4
- Scoring: Orchestra

Premiere
- Date: 31 March 1794
- Location: Hanover Square Rooms, London
- Conductor: Joseph Haydn

The Symphony No. 100 in G major, Hob. I:100, is the eighth of the twelve London symphonies written by Joseph Haydn and completed in 1793 or 1794. It is popularly known as the Military Symphony.

The symphony was premiered at the Hanover Square Rooms on 31 March 1794, with Haydn himself leading the orchestra at the fortepiano.

The nickname "Military" derives from the inclusion of C trumpets and "Turkish Janissary" untuned percussion, especially in the second movement and the closing section of the fourth movement, which feature prominent fanfares written for them. One reviewer wrote after the premiere that the second movement evoked the "hellish roar of war increas[ing] to a climax of horrid sublimity!"

== Music ==
I. Adagio – Allegro

II. Allegretto

III. Menuetto: Moderato

IV. Presto
Performed by the Salzburg Mozarteum Orchestra under the baton of Fritz Weidlich

The symphony is scored for two flutes, two oboes, two clarinets, two bassoons, two horns, two trumpets, timpani, triangle, cymbals, bass drum and strings (violins, violas, cellos and basses). In several editions, there is only one flute.

It is in standard four-movement form:

1. Adagio – Allegro, 4/4 then 2/2
2. Allegretto, 2/2 in C major
3. Menuetto: Moderato, 3/4
4. Presto, 6/8

=== I. Adagio – Allegro ===
The first movement is in sonata form with a slow introduction that hints at motifs that will appear later in the movement. The Allegro begins with a dancing theme which is unexpectedly scored only for flutes and oboes. The strings respond by repeating the theme an octave lower. The tutti then transitions the music to the dominant key for the second subject area, which begins with the first theme transposed to D major. This theme is briefly developed in D minor before a new subject in the dominant is stated with a rocking motif in the violins. Haydn's use of themes and keys here demonstrates an important point about sonata form: the second subject is defined by the new key, not (only) a new theme. The repetition of the 1st subject in the dominant in this movement, at bar 75, is therefore the beginning of the 2nd subject area, even though the new theme does not appear until some twenty bars later.

A tutti codetta brings the first movement exposition to a close. Following a repeat, the development begins with a grand pause of two measures, the rocking motif appears in the distant key of B♭ major and is developed upward through several keys. The first theme then returns in E major and is development in tandem with the rocking motif back towards the tonic for the recapitulation. In the recapitulation, the response to the dancing flute/oboe theme is by the full tutti instead of just the strings. The rocking motif returns several times and a full tutti brings the movement to a close without a coda.

=== II. Allegretto ===
The "Military" second movement is derived from a movement from an earlier Concerto for Lire Organizzate in G, Hob. VIIh/3, which Haydn had composed for Ferdinand IV, King of Naples. The movement is in ternary form with central section in the minor. The instrumentation is richer than the other movements of the symphony. It is the only movement that uses divided violas and clarinets, but most importantly is the use of "Turkish" instruments (triangle, cymbals and bass drum) which make their first appearance in the central minor section. The movement concludes with an extended coda featuring a bugle call for solo trumpet, a timpani roll, which was a revolutionary adaptation of the instrument, and a loud outburst in A♭ major.

=== III. Menuetto: Moderato ===
In contrast to Haydn's trend of speeding up his minuets, here he slows the pace back to Moderato providing a more old-fashioned aristocratic minuet.

=== IV. Presto ===
The finale is in sonata rondo form. The primary theme became a popular tune in its time. In the center of the movement is a development-like section which contains a surprise timpani strike followed by a traversal of many distant keys. Near the end of the movement, the "Turkish" instruments return coloring the tutti sections for the rest of the way.

== See also ==
- List of symphonies by name
