= Karen Cargill =

Scottish operatic mezzo-soprano singer

Karen Cargill is a Scottish operatic mezzo-soprano singer. She has performed with the Metropolitan Opera and at the Edinburgh International Festival.

== Early life ==
Cargill was born in Arbroath, Scotland. Her father was a plumber and her mother worked in a bank. She attended Carnoustie Academy. She studied at the Royal Scottish Academy of Music and Drama with an exchange year in Toronto, Canada.

== Music career ==
She was joint winner of 2002 Kathleen Ferrier Award, with bass-baritone Jonathan Lemalu. She made her Scottish Opera debut in September 2007 with the part of Rosina in The Barber of Seville.

In April 2012, she recorded Berlioz's Les Nuits d'été with the Scottish Chamber Orchestra conducted by Robin Ticciati (Linn records). In December 2012 she appeared in the supporting cast with the Metropolitan Opera for Berlioz's Les Troyens. In April 2013 she appeared with the Metropolitan Opera performing as Waltraute in the Götterdämmerung. The same year, she recorded Berlioz's La Mort de Cléopâtre with Valery Gergiev conducting. In April 2015 she appeared at the Weill Recital Hall to perform Mahler's Rückert-Lieder, billed as her New York debut in songs.

In 2016, she performed at the Edinburgh International Festival. In September of that year she performed at the Proms in the Park at Glasgow Green. In 2017 she performed "Um Mitternacht" (Rückert Lieder) at the Edinburgh International Festival.

In September 2020, during the COVID-19 pandemic, Cargill played Judith in Bluebeard's Castle in a London Symphony Orchestra performance which was made available online. She wrote about the experience and the role of Judith for The Guardian.
