= History of timpani =

History of the Timpani
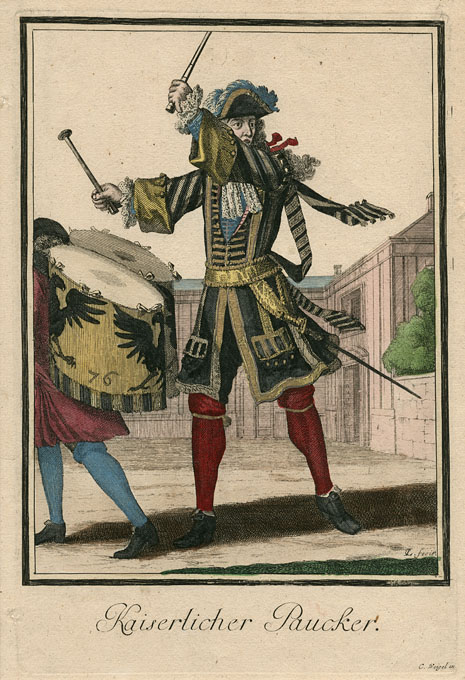
- Example of timpani being played c. 1703
- Other names: Kettle drums, Pauken, Timbale, Timpano, Timbals
- Hornbostel–Sachs classification: 211.11-922 (Struck membranophone with membrane lapped on by a hoop)
- Developed: 12th century from the Arabic naker

Playing range
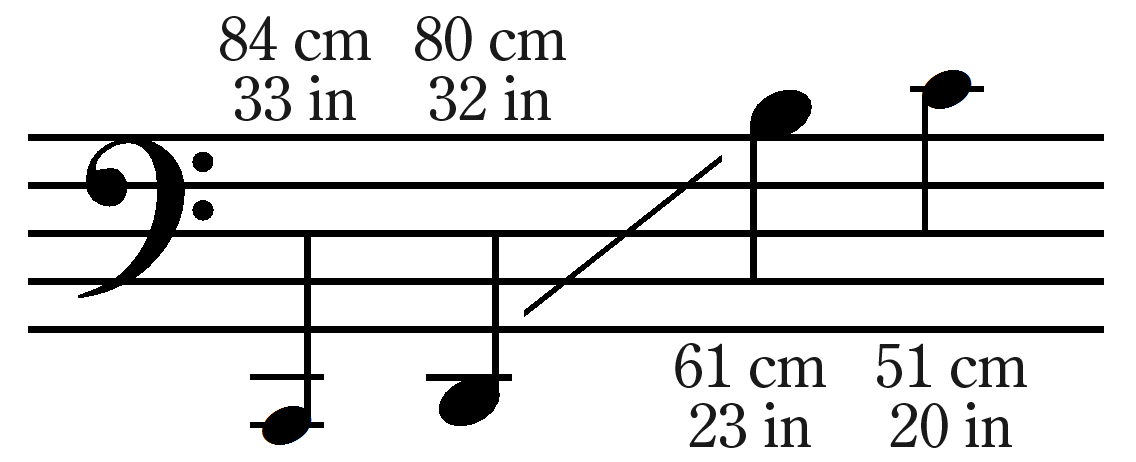

Related instruments
- Kus; Naqareh; Naker

The modern timpani evolved in the 18th and 19th centuries from the simple 12th-century membranophone of the Naker to a complex instrument, consisting of a suspended kettle with a foot-operated clutch, capable of rapid tuning. The technological evolution of the instrument led to increased interest in its capabilities and sound among such composers as Joseph Haydn, Wolfgang Amadeus Mozart, Ludwig van Beethoven, Robert Schumann, and Hector Berlioz.

Initially used only outdoors, the instrument underwent modifications in the 16th and 17th centuries that led to its incorporation into chamber ensembles. During the 18th and 19th centuries, modifications in its design and construction, and rising interest in the symphony orchestra led to changes not only to the ensemble's size, but also to composers' use of specific instruments within the orchestra.

These new and challenging compositional demands influenced the design of the timpani, how timpanists play the instrument, and also helped to raise the standard of playing to a whole new level. The combination of composers' and players' interest in the timpani during the 18th and 19th centuries helped to make the instrument what it is today.

== Pre-18th-century timpani construction and use ==
=== 13th–15th-century timpani use and development ===
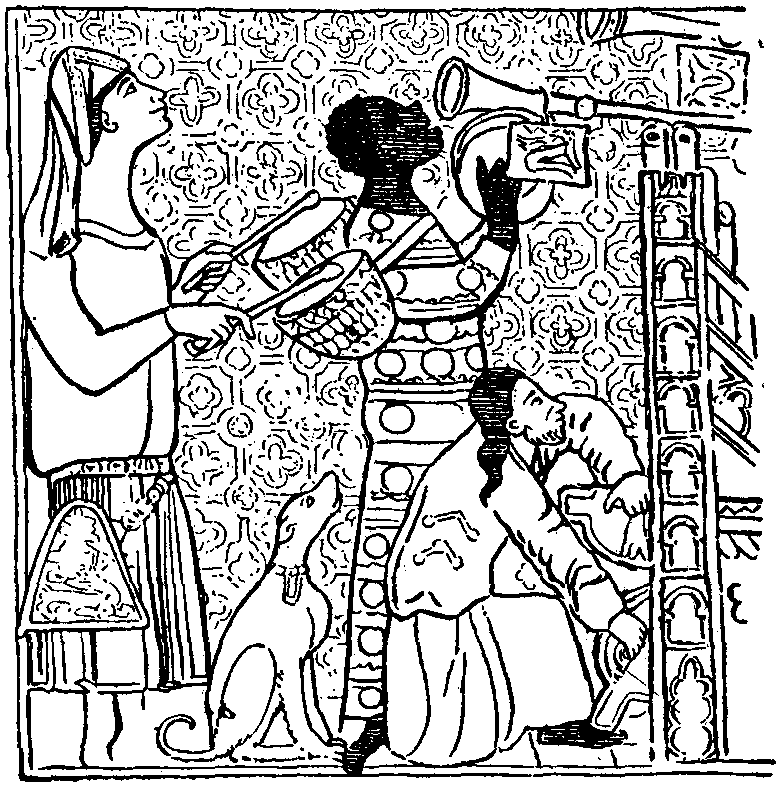
A drawing depicting Medieval Nakers

The timpani is considerably older than other melodic percussion instruments, such as the marimba and xylophone. Music historians trace the instrument's history to ancient times when the drums were used in religious ceremonies. During the 13th century, timpani began to be used in pairs and were called Nakers, or Nakirs. These drums were small, usually between 7 and 9 inches (178 and 229 mm), and were used primarily by the military. The construction of these drums was composed of a shell made of either metal or wood and a head, which was connected directly to the shell of the drum and did not allow for the drums pitch to be altered at all. The drums themselves were tuned to fixed pitches and were usually tuned to an interval of a fourth or a fifth. These drums were used until the 15th century, when cavalry such as the Mongols, Muslims and Ottoman Turks would mount timpani-like drums on horseback. These drums were much larger than those previously used and were very similar to the drums that would be later used in the orchestra.

The instrument itself was made of a large metal or copper bowl and had an animal skin, usually goat, pulled tight across the bowl. Europeans added a system of screw-tension to allow for more precise tuning of the heads. Combined with the development of the so-called Counter hoop, the system created greater resonance and more precise pitch. A "Counter Hoop" is a hoop that is placed over the head of the drum and uses some type of screw or rod mechanism to connect the hoop to the bowl. This allowed for the head itself to not be directly attached to the bowl and thus provides a way for the head to vibrate more freely as well as be fine-tuned more easily.

=== Early European use of timpani ===
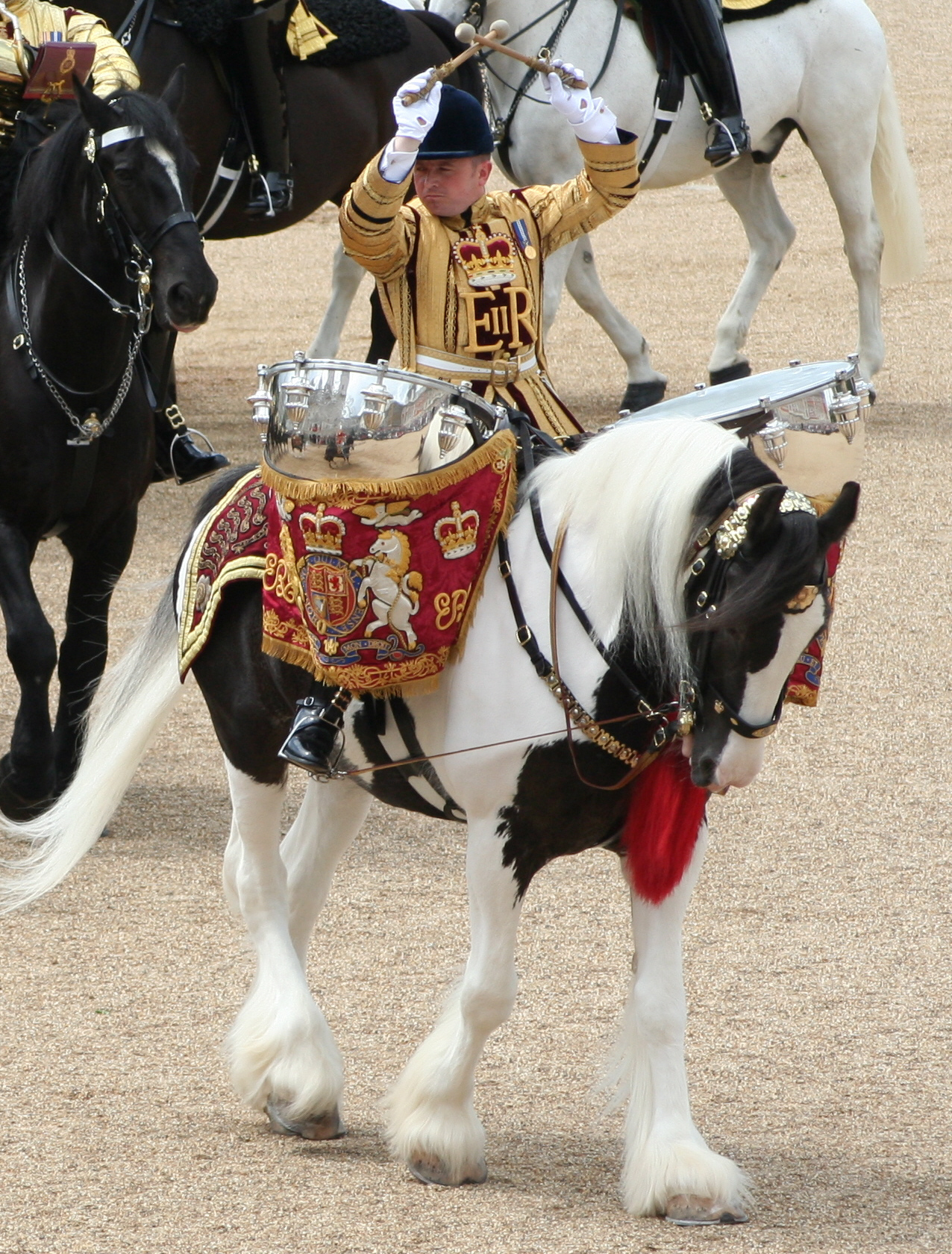
A modern representation of horse mounted Cavalry Timpani

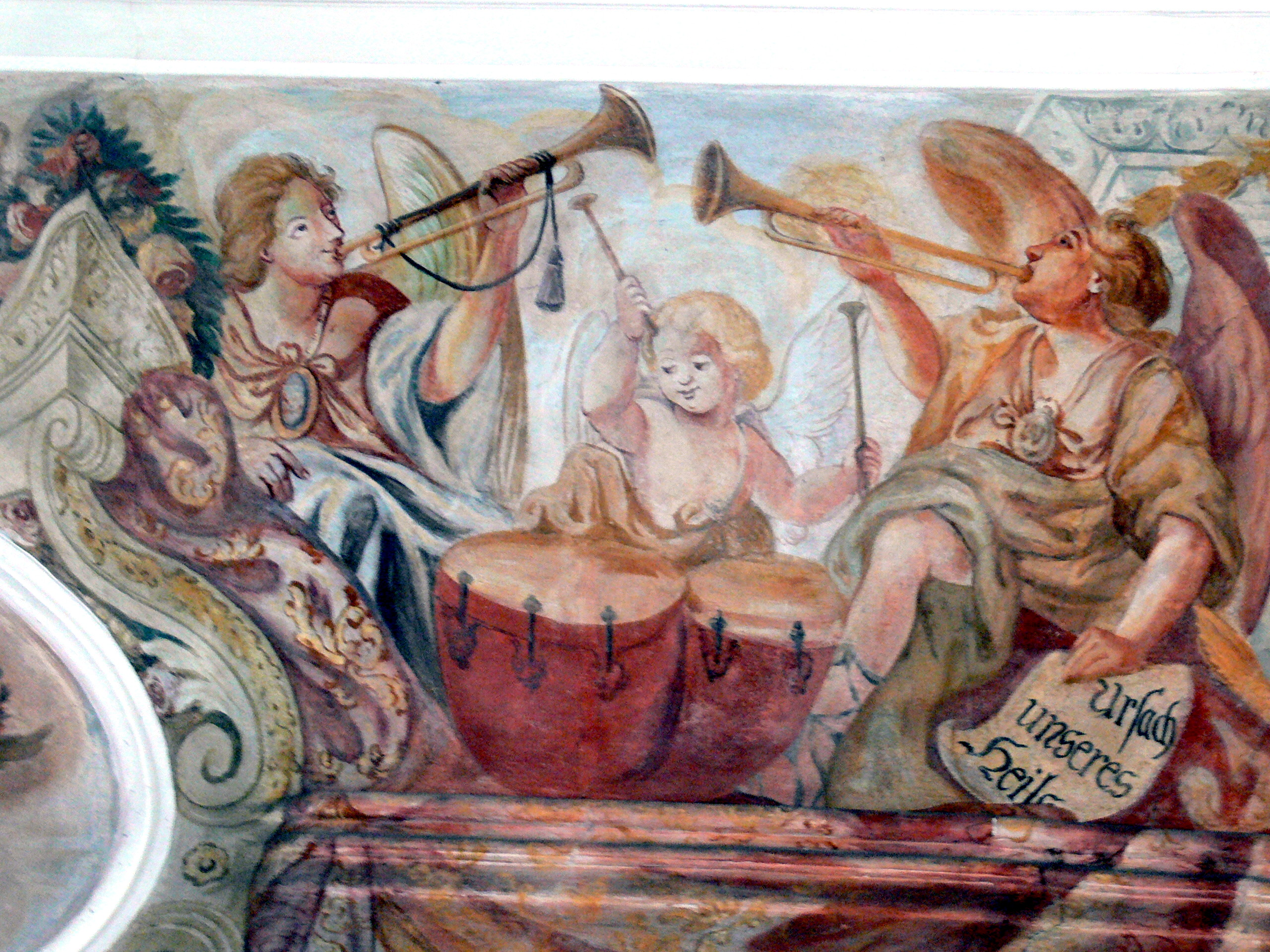
A Fresco from Our Lady's chapel in Altenmarkt depicting the pairing of the timpani and natural trumpet.

The horse-mounted timpani of the Ottoman Empire was sure to be one of the sources of inspiration for the European adoption of timpani into their cavalry. Having timpani in the cavalry was rare and the drums were only awarded to the most elite of groups. The drums were paired with trumpeters and announced the arrival of the armies. Both the trumpeters and the timpanists were highly regarded and were often placed close to a commander when in battle. This relationship between the trumpet and timpani continued for many centuries. As empires in Europe gave way to royal courts, the timpani and trumpet pairing continued to be used, but they were now used as more of an image-builder for the nobility. It was common for emperors, dukes, lords and others of high rank to travel with a timpanist and trumpeter to emphasize the importance of their social rank. Those who possessed timpani were an exclusive group. This meant that timpanists themselves were only allowed to be employed by nobility and were not to interact with other instrumentalists, who were considered to be household employees of an inferior rank. As a result, guilds were formed by timpanists and trumpeters and members were treated as an elite group.

== Timpani move indoors ==
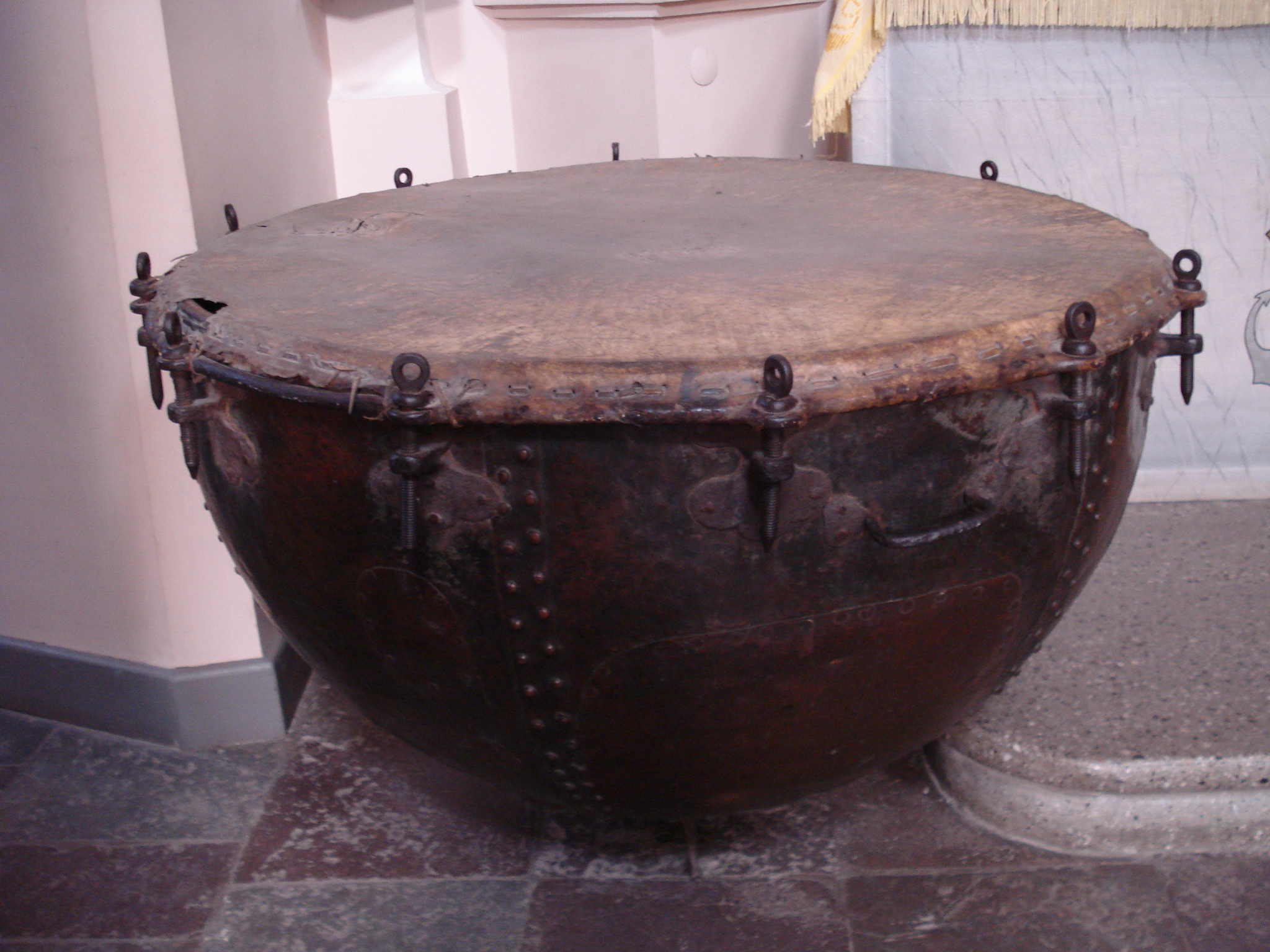
A 17th-century timpano

Although the timpani was still considered primarily an outdoor instrument, it started being used during indoor concerts to provide rhythmic support for trumpet fanfares. Most of the time, players would not have written music to follow because parts were handed down from generation to generation and were learned by rote. By the 17th century, the timpani moved indoors for good and composers began to demand more from timpanists than ever before. The timpani was first introduced to the court orchestras and opera ensembles as well as in larger church works. Due to this move indoors, a much more formalized way of playing and approaching the timpani was developed. The old practice of learning parts by rote gave way to written music and composers began writing more regularly for the timpani. More notes were written than just two simultaneous pitches and as a result, timpanists were faced with the issue of how to play their parts on the equipment they had. One solution was for timpanists to add more drums to their set-up, but this also created a problem: During this time, performances often took place in courts or at smaller theaters that had limited stage space and large timpani set-ups did not fit very well. Timpanists at this time were faced with a problem; using a large, cumbersome set of timpani to play their parts would not be possible due to space restraints. However, a solution was found, and with the help of technological advancements during the 18th century in Europe, devices were developed and added to the drums to change the pitch. These changes allowed for a single drum to play more than just two notes. This provided a way for timpanists to not only play their parts more easily but also use fewer drums.

== Technological developments in the timpani ==
=== First advancement in rapid tuning ===
Around this time, Europe was beginning to enter an era of Industrial Revolution, and new technological breakthroughs helped provide timpanists with possible ways to alter the pitch on one of their drums. The first major advancement is believed to have been made by Gerhard Cramer in 1812. The new orchestral works required faster tuning of the timpani. He worked with a court locksmith and the royal armorer to make his first set of drums. Although no diagrams or drawings of what the drums looked like exist, there are several rough descriptions of how the drums worked. The kettle of the drum was attached to a wooden base. Rods curved down along the kettle and connected the counter hoop to a threaded hole at the bottom of the bowl. There was a bolt inside of the threaded hole that allowed for the entire mechanism to be raised and lowered. In order for the bolt to be turned and the drum to move, there were several levers that led to a larger vertical lever that came out of the wooden base and when moved would either raise or lower the bowl, thus changing the pitch.

=== Rotating timpani ===
The next breakthrough in rapid tuning came around 1815 when Johann Stumpff, a musician and inventor from Amsterdam invented a way for a drum's pitch to be changed by physically rotating the instrument. Similar to Cramer's design, rods attached the counter hoop to a metal ring below the bowl. Unlike Cramer's design, Stumpff added a second metal ring that was attached to the legs supporting the kettle. The bottom ring was threaded and a long bolt extended from the base of the drum up through the threaded ring and attached to the second ring. As the bowl and counter hoop rotated, the counter hoop would move up and down but the bowl would remain stationary. This allowed for different levels of tension to be placed on the counter hoop and, as a result, produced different pitches. This invention was popular because it was cheap to manufacture, worked well, and was easy to transport, which made these drums ideal for traveling orchestras. However, the fact that players had to put down the mallets before rotating the drums was a major drawback.

=== First suspended kettle ===
In 1836, Johann Kasper Einbigler designed a drum that not only was easier to tune than previous models, but also provided a far superior tone quality. He was able to improve the tone quality by suspending the kettle with struts that were attached to the top of the kettle. This differed from previous models on which the rods were attached the side of the kettle. The struts on Einbigler's drum were directly connected to the support system under the drum and this allowed for the kettle to resonate more freely.

The tuning mechanism of these drums combined aspects of both Cramer and Stumpff's designs. There were rods that attached the counter hoop to a ring, or what is known today as a spider, which was located under the kettle. The spider was connected to an arm under the base which was raised and lowered by a vertical tuning crank to change the pitch of the drums. There were many reasons why these drums were so successful. Besides the already mentioned more freely resonating kettle, this system of tuning was much quieter than the previous designs, allowing timpanists to change the drum's pitch during quiet parts of the music.

=== First foot-activated tuning system ===
In 1840, August Knocke, a gunsmith who lived in Munich designed the first set of drums where the tuning was done using the player's foot rather than hands. He used a similar two-ring design where one ring remained stationary and the other moved up and down to alter the pitch. Gears were attached to the rings and another separate ring was connected that would be turned by the player's foot to alter the pitch. This foot-activated tuning ring replaced the vertical lever which was previously used to change the pitch. These drums also utilized the suspended kettle to provide the best tone quality possible. These drums were commonly used in German orchestras at the time and one of the most notable groups to use these drums was the court theater in Munich. These drums received numerous accolades during the mid-19th century. They received honorable mention at The Great Exhibition (1851) in London as well as receiving a medal of honor at the 1854 German Industrial Exhibition in Munich at the Glaspalast.

=== Pfundt/Hoffmann drums ===
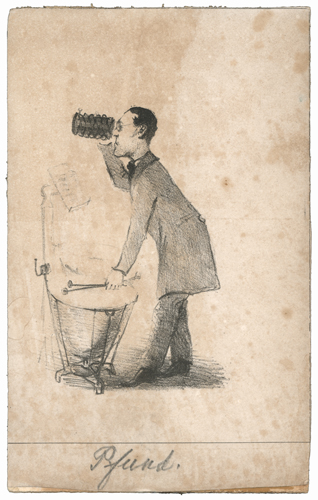
A drawing of timpanist and designer Ernst Pfundt playing his newly developed drums

These drums came about as a result of several modifications that were made to the Einbigler drums. The changes were suggested by timpani virtuoso of the time Ernst Gotthold Pfundt, as well as Carl Hoffmann and Friedrich Hentschel. The changes they made to the drum included a much larger fork-shaped support for the kettle which was attached the very rim of the kettle as well using heavier iron for the assembly of the drum to provide much more support. These drums also replaced the previously thin spider with a solid disk that was attached to the rocker arm under the drum by a very strong vertical axle. This stronger base and spider allowed for fine tunings to be done with much more ease. Timpani scholar Edmund Bowles summarizes the changes by saying, "Their contribution was a single, threaded crank acting upon a threaded lever that controlled the armature to which the tuning rods were attached. More significant was that this simple device multiplied the force transmitted to the base plate by the tuning crank, making for a far more efficient and powerful mechanism." These drums were also very highly regarded, as they received honorable mentions at both the Vienna World Fair in 1873 and the Dresden Trade Show in 1875.

=== Dresden model ===
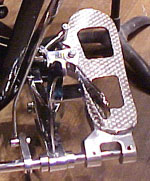
A modern example of the "Dresden" foot pedal

The last major development in timpani construction during the 19th century came in 1881 when Carl Pittrich, the Kapelldiener (German: Chapel Servant) in the Royal Saxon Orchestra, developed a foot pedal mechanism that could be attached to a timpani and made quick tuning changes much easier. This system was first developed to be an addition to the Pfundt/Hoffmann drums and was manufactured by Ernst Queisser. Later, Paul Focke manufactured the complete drum and pedal system in Dresden, Germany, thus giving it name of the "Dresden Model". The system worked by having a pedal that had a heavy counter weight at the top which was then connected to a rod at the bottom of the pedal. Using a series of gears and couplings, this rod was attached to the rocker arm underneath the kettle. The pedal had a clutch on it that allowed for the player to disengage the pedal when they desired to change the pitch. When the pedal was disengaged and moved up or down, the rod connecting to the rocker arm would be moved in either direction and as a result, the tension on the timpani head would be altered, providing a change in pitch. Once the desired pitch was reached, the player could re-engage the clutch and the pedal as well as the pitch would stay stationary. This new pedal system not only allowed for the drums' pitches to be changed faster, easier, and more accurately, but it also allowed for the hands of the timpanist to remain free to play and not be bothered with changing the drums pitch during a performance.

== Changes in timpani composition ==
=== Haydn's timpani writing ===
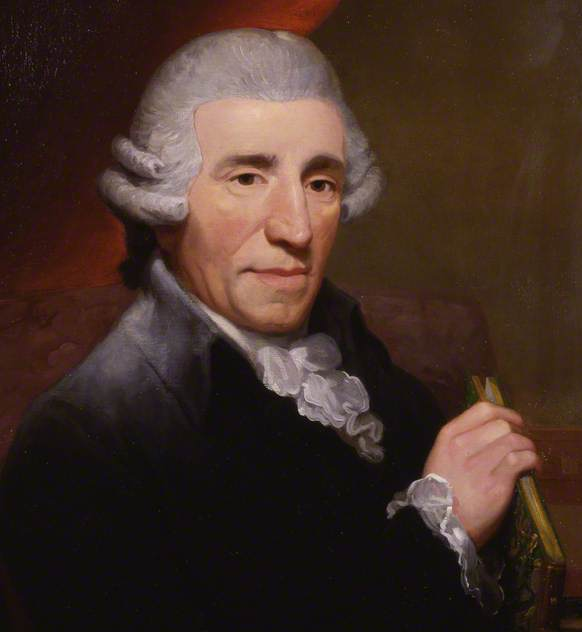
Haydn was one of the first composers to write a pitch change as well as a written out solo for the timpani in a symphonic movement.

Until the late 18th century, written music for the timpani consisted of very simple rhythms with the drums usually only being played at major cadence points in the music. It was rare if the timpani were not playing along with the trumpets, and composers would often use the drums to add dramatic effect to trumpet notes and brass chords. However, this compositional pattern began to change as Austrian composer Joseph Haydn started utilizing the timpani in new ways. Haydn had learned the instrument, and performed on it in public, while he was a child attending boarding school in Hainburg, Austria. He remained interested in the timpani and new effects for them throughout his career.

In Haydn's Symphony No. 94, one of the earliest examples of the timpanist being required to change the pitch of a single drum within a symphonic movement is found. In measures 131–134 of the original autograph score, Haydn writes for a change in the timpani part from G and D to A and D. In order to allow for the timpanist to change the pitch of the drum, Haydn left plenty of measures rest in between the last G and the first A, and then did the same for when the drum is to be tuned back down to the G again.

Another example of Haydn's progressive writing for the timpani can be found by looking at his Symphony No. 100, also known as the "Military" Symphony. Previous to this symphony, it was a rarity for the timpani to play a solo passage in a symphonic work. In the "Military" symphony, Haydn separates the timpani from the trumpet and horn and writes out a solo passage for the timpanist. In measure 159 of the second movement, the entire orchestra drops out and only the timpani plays with two measures of sixteenth notes. Haydn uses a crescendo through these two measures to help build up intensity before the entire orchestra erupts into a loud, driving passage. In measure 122 of the final movement, Haydn again has the entire orchestra drop out and writes another measure solo for the timpani. Before this solo, Haydn has the orchestra playing quite softly which makes the timpani's loud entrance come as a surprise and helps to set up a loud entrance by the orchestra.

Haydn's use of writing specific solos for the timpani can also be seen in the very opening measure of his Symphony No. 103. This entire symphony begins with a timpani solo, and because of this, it has received the nickname of the "Drum Roll" symphony.

=== Beethoven's timpani writing ===
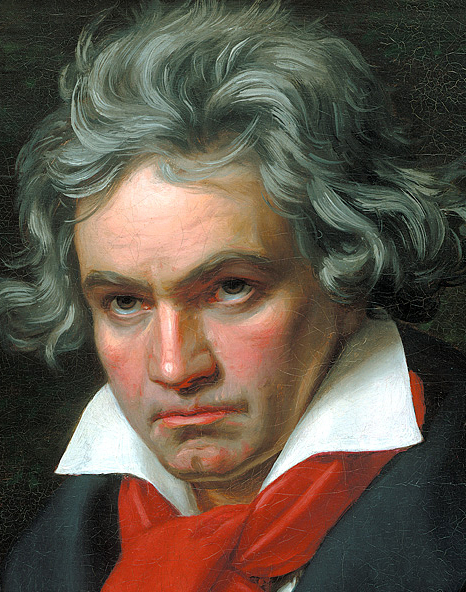
Beethoven played a crucial role in advancing timpani writing by not only extending the written range of the timpani, but also including more extended techniques like double stops.

Like Haydn, Ludwig van Beethoven began one of his famous works, his Violin Concerto, with a timpani solo. Unlike in the Drum Roll symphony, Beethoven's solo forms the opening theme; the same notes, when they reappear in the recapitulation section (m. 365), are played by the full orchestra.

Beethoven had a reputation for composing the music that he wanted to hear, and was not much concerned with the instruments' limitations in his writing. This can be seen in his writing for the timpani. In his Symphony No. 7, he requires the timpanist to tune the drums for the first time ever in a symphonic work to an interval larger than a fifth. In the third movement of this symphony, Beethoven has the timpanist tune the drums to a minor sixth of F and A. He continued to expand the range of the timpani when writing his 8th symphony. In the final Allegro vivace movement, Beethoven writes for the timpani to play octave F's, something that had not been required of a timpanist in a symphonic movement until this time. In his Symphony No. 9, Beethoven presents some of the most advanced timpani writing to be seen by any composer yet. In the second movement of the piece, he again writes for the timpani to be tuned to octave F's, but also writes numerous loud solo passages throughout the movement for the timpani to play. The third movement of this same symphony also presents a new challenge for timpanists, as Beethoven requires that two drums be played at the same time for the last five measures of the movement to make the sound of a double stop.

=== Berlioz's timpani writing ===
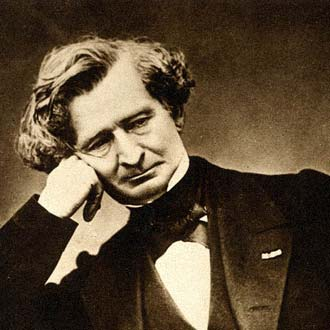
Hector Berlioz (pictured in 1863) helped to continue to expand the timpani's compositional possibilities in the orchestra with his radical timpani writing in his Symphonie Fantastique and Grande Messe des Morts.

Hector Berlioz further expanded the timpani's abilities in his compositions. In the composing of his programmatic piece Symphonie fantastique, Berlioz asked for two individual sets of timpani to be used. At one point during the piece, starting two measures after rehearsal number forty-nine in the third movement, Berlioz writes a timpani part to be played by four timpanists. The last two movements of the piece also utilize two timpanists throughout, with each player using a set of two timpani and having to play challenging rhythms and make several tuning changes.

Berlioz also employed unusual timpani scoring in his Grande Messe des Morts. For the Dies Irae, Berlioz requests 8 pairs of timpani, 2 of which have two players (for double-stop rolls). They are tuned for the diatonic notes of the E♭ major scale, plus G♭ and A♮. This permits a continuous and harmonious timpani roll starting a bar before rehearsal number 20 for 16 bars. The timpani have multiple notes available no matter what the underlying harmonies may be. Similarly, in the Lacrymosa, he calls for 16 timpani in three doubled pairs (12) plus two single. They are tuned to the diatonic scale of G major, from low F♯ to E, with an additional D♯. (This is along with 4 choirs of brass instruments.) Again there is a continuous timpani roll from shortly after rehearsal number 58 to rehearsal number 59. In the final movement, the Agnus Dei, 8 players play pairs of timpani tuned to nearly all the diatonic notes of G major from low F♯ to D (E is missing). Starting just before rehearsal number 102, all 8 players play the same rhythm on the G major triad.

Berlioz's radical use of the timpani in Symphonie Fantastique and Grande Messe des Morts demonstrated how much the compositional practices of the instrument had progressed from that of Mozart and Haydn, but composers continued to challenge timpanists as they wrote more and more difficult passages in their compositions.

=== Schumann's timpani writing ===
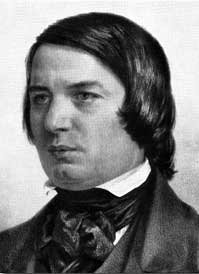
Schumann was one of the first composers to write for three timpani rather than just two.

When composer Robert Schumann revised his Symphony No. 1, he made the timpani part considerably more difficult that required three timpani rather than the standard two-drum set. The first movement of Schumann's Symphony No. 1 demonstrates how the composer utilized the three different drum pitches to support the harmonies and orchestration. Some music historians conclude that Schumann's cousin-in-law Ernst Pfundt, the main timpanist in Leipzig and a prominent figure in timpani development, suggested the use of three machines. Regardless, Schumann understood the harmonic possibilities of three drums and realized that the score would not require as many rests to allow the timpanist enough time to re-tune the drums. The use of three timpani quickly became the standard configuration. With the invention of the "Dresden" foot pedal system, composers writing for the timpani had nearly limitless compositional possibilities.

=== Impact of the "Dresden" timpani on compositions ===
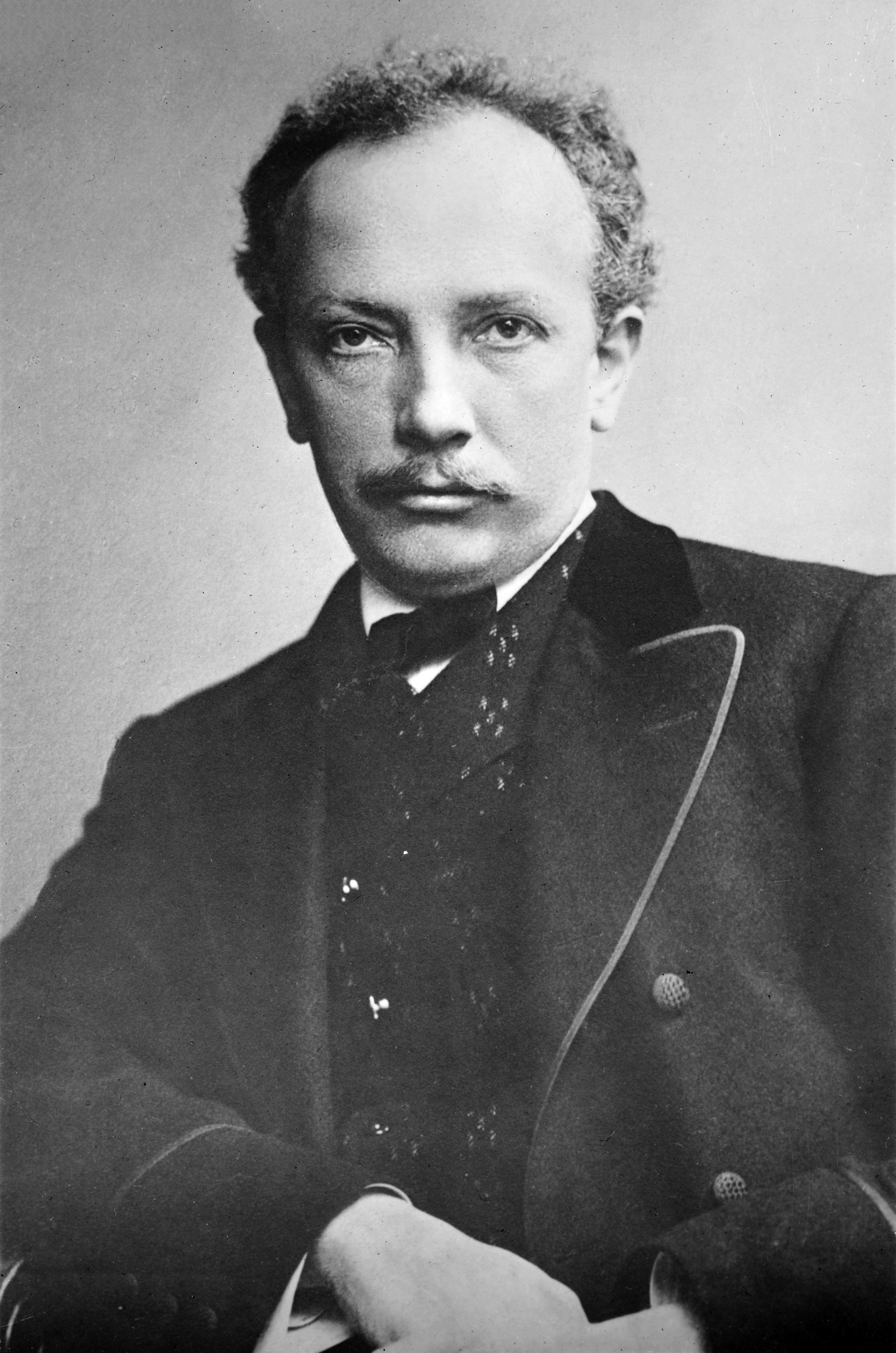
Richard Strauss utilized the invention of the Dresden foot pedal in his music to write more melodically for the timpani.

The impact of the Dresden timpani on composers could be seen in Giuseppe Verdi's opera Otello (1887). The timpani part in Act 1 would not be possible to play without the use of at least three pedal timpani. Verdi required the timpanist to quickly change the pitch of the drums while also sustaining a roll, demonstrating the composer's understanding of how the pedal timpani worked. It would not be possible for the timpanist to play a sustained note and simultaneously change the pitch of another drum without using a set of pedal timpani. As time went on and word got around as to how well the new foot-pedal timpani worked, more and more orchestras purchased Pittrich's "Dresden" style timpani, and it was not long until almost all timpanists were playing on foot-tuned drums.

The rapid increase in popularity of these new drums sparked the start of a new era in composing for the timpani. Gone were the old ways of timpanists only playing the tonic and dominant. Composers began to write increasingly involved parts for the timpani and sought ways to challenge the timpanist, both technically and melodically. Richard Strauss's compositions included timpani parts with very difficult rhythmic passages and challenging tuning changes that could only be played using a set of pedal timpani. For example, in the final waltz in Act 3 of his opera Der Rosenkavalier, Strauss wrote for the timpani the way he wrote for the bass, with a long, walking melodic line. He accomplished this by requiring the timpanist to make many quick and challenging changes in the drums pitch that imitated the walking bassline that occurs throughout the entire waltz.

== Bibliography ==
=== Sources ===
- Beethoven, Ludwig van. Symphonies Nos. 5,6, and 7 in Full Score. Mineola, NY: Dover Publications, 1989.
- Beethoven, Ludwig van. Symphonies Nos. 8 and 9 in Full Score. Mineola, NY: Dover Publications, 1989.
- Berlioz, Hector. Symphonie Fantastique and Harold in Italy in Full Score. From the Complete Works Edition Edited by Charles Malherbe and Felix Weingartner. Mineola, NY: Dover Publications, 1984.
- Blades, James Percussion Instruments and Their History London and Boston: Faber and Faber, 1984.
- Bowles, Edmund A. "Nineteenth-Century innovations in the Use and Construction of the Timpani." Percussionist, Official Publication of The Percussive Arts Society 1982, 19:2, pp. 6–75
- Bowles, Edmund A. "The Double, Double, Double Beat of the Thundering Drum: The Timpani in Early Music." Early Music 19:3 (Aug. 1991): pp. 419–435.
- Bowles, Edmund A. The Timpani: A History in Pictures and Documents. Hillsdale, NY: Pendragon Press, 2002.
- Bridge, Robert. "Timpani Construction paper" Retrieved 12 February 2010.
- Browne, P. A. "The Orchestral Treatment of the Timpani." Music & Letters 4, no. 4 (Oct.1923): 334–339.
- Finger, G. "The history of the timpani." Percussionist. 1974, 11:3, pp. 101–111.
- Haydn, Joseph. London Symphonies Nos. 93–98 in Full Score. Mineola, NY: Dover Publications, Inc. 1997.
- Haydn, Joseph. London Symphonies Nos. 99–104 in Full Score. Mineola, NY: Dover Publications, Inc. 1999.
- Schumann, Robert. Complete Symphonies in Full Score. From the Breitkopf & Hartel Complete Works Edition. Edited by Clara Schumann. Mineola, NY: Dover Publications, Inc. 1980.
- Strauss, Richard. Der Rosenkavalier in Full Score. Mineola, NY: Dover Publications, 1987.
- Taylor, Henry W. The Timpani. London: John Baker Publishers 1964.
- Verdi, Giuseppe. Otello in Full Score. Mineola, NY: Dover Publications, 1986.
