= Extreme overvalued belief =

An extreme overvalued belief is shared by others in a person's cultural, religious, or subcultural group (including online). The belief is often relished, amplified, and defended by the possessor of the belief and is differentiated from a delusion or obsession. Over time, the belief grows more dominant, more refined, and more resistant to challenge. The individual has an intense emotional commitment to the belief and may carry out violent behavior in its service. Over time, belief becomes increasingly binary, simplistic, and absolute.

== Definition ==
The description was first proposed by a group of forensic psychiatrists led by psychiatrist Dr. Tahir Rahman at Washington University in St. Louis in response to an analysis of the insanity trial of Anders Breivik, a Norwegian terrorist responsible for the massacre of 77 people, mostly youth, in Oslo and Utoya, Norway, in July 2011.

Extreme overvalued beliefs can be the cognitive-affective drivers of a pathological fixation – preoccupation with a particular person or cause that is accompanied by deterioration in social and occupational functioning. Fixation is a very frequent proximal warning behavior in targeted attacks where violence is planned, purposeful, and predatory. Although fixation is not a predictor of such attacks, its frequency—typically occurring in four out of five cases—across a variety of domains of targeted attackers prior to their actions provides support for its use as a correlate of such behavior.

== Background ==
German neuropsychiatrist Carl Wernicke is viewed as the first major contributor who coined the term "overvalued idea" (Überwertige Idee) in 1892. His terminology focused on overvalued ideas as being beliefs that were shared by others. Further, in this work, he stressed that overvalued ideas are different from having a mental illness. As a result, he argued that any criminal behavior could be incorrectly attributed to mental illness without proper understanding of the beliefs or background that may underlie an individual's actions.

The current understanding of the term overvalued idea is less clear and concise in today's literature. While most sources agree that an overvalued idea is not necessarily false and is shared among individuals of a given culture or subculture, the definition of an overvalued idea by the American Psychiatric Association (APA) in DSM-5-TR is defined as a belief that is not generally shared or accepted by other members of a given group or culture—the exact opposite of its historical meaning.

This concept of an overvalued idea described by Wernicke has since been re-examined along with other sources describing it within the literature and used as a basis for coining the term extreme overvalued belief.

== Importance ==
Extreme overvalued beliefs are seen as a predominant motivator driving terrorist attacks, assassins, and mass shootings.

Often times, forensic psychiatrists and psychologists encounter a patient who seems to hold very strange or bizarre beliefs when conducting either a threat assessment or a forensic examination (e.g., for the purposes of an insanity defense). However, these beliefs do not adequately meet DSM-5-TR criteria for a psychiatric disorder and cannot be fully explained by the existing psychiatric terms such as delusion or obsession. Further, the lack of clear and concise definitions of many psychiatric terms can further complicate matters. As a result, the media and psychiatrists often erroneously define individuals who have carried out inexplicable acts of terrorism or violence as having been driven by delusions, obsessions or paranoia. Instead, what these individuals actually possess are extreme overvalued beliefs, and the acts they have committed are seen by them as a defense to uphold those beliefs.

== Difference from delusion and obsession ==
Delusions are by definition false beliefs that are not shared by other members of an individual's group or society. These are often held with strong commitment, even in the face of direct evidence to the contrary, and are idiosyncratic, often bizarre, and personalized.

Obsessions are intrusive thoughts or images that are often very disturbing to the individual who has them. These are often distressing, and therefore may lead to carrying out compensatory behaviors (i.e. compulsions) to alleviate the distress (see obsessive-compulsive disorder) for a period of time.

Notably, both delusions and obsessions are different from extreme overvalued beliefs.

While extreme overvalued beliefs are shared by individuals of the same culture and/or subculture, this is not true of delusions. A delusion is an inherently false belief that is not shared by anyone else, while an extreme overvalued belief is shared by others and can become more dominant over time. Further, when an extreme overvalued belief is considered within the context of the group that possesses it, it is not necessarily false or extreme from within their perspective.

In addition, while overvalued beliefs and obsessions are similar in that they can both grow to dominate an individual's mind and take control of their everyday life, they also differ in that obsessions are distressing to the individual while extreme overvalued beliefs are not "fought off". In fact, individuals with extreme overvalued beliefs will amplify their belief over time and defend it with extreme actions, in some cases using violence.

== See also ==
- Idée fixe (psychology)
