= Harriet Smithson =

Anglo-Irish actress (1800–1854)

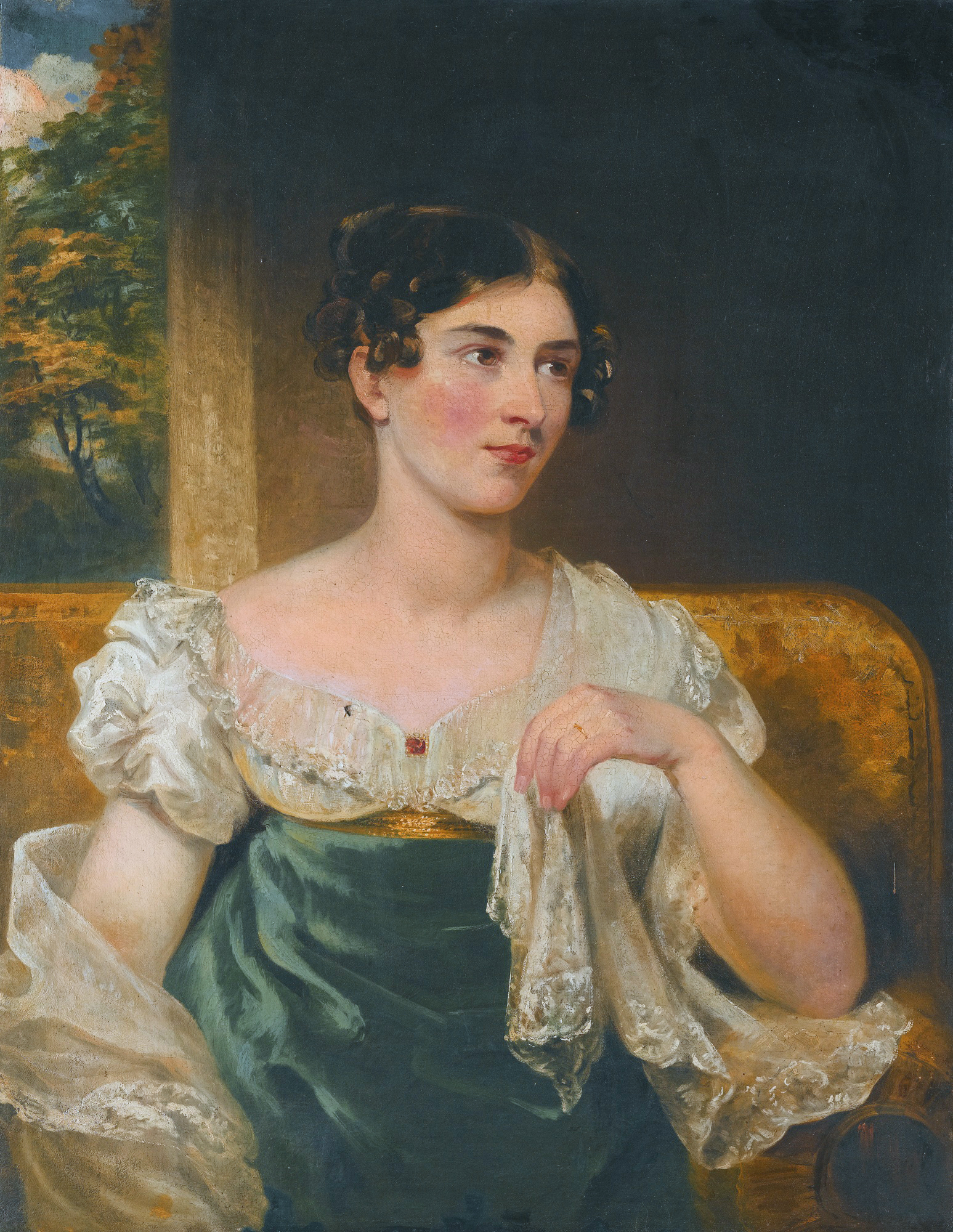
- Portrait by George Clint
- Born: Harriet Constance Smithson; 18 March 1800; Ennis, County Clare, Kingdom of Ireland
- Died: 3 March 1854 (aged 53); Paris, France
- Occupation: Shakespearean actress
- Years active: 1814–1837
- Spouse: Hector Berlioz (m. 1833; died 1854) (separated in 1843)

Harriet Constance Smithson (18 March 1800 – 3 March 1854), who also went by Henrietta Constance Smithson, Harriet Smithson Berlioz, and Miss H.C. Smithson, was an Anglo-Irish Shakespearean actress of the 19th century, best known as the first wife and muse of Hector Berlioz.

== Early life ==
Harriet Smithson was born on 18 March 1800, at Ennis, County Clare, Kingdom of Ireland. Her father, William Joseph Smithson, was an actor and theatrical manager from Gloucestershire, England, and her mother was an actress whose full name is unknown. She also had a brother, Joseph Smithson, and a sister, whose name is also unknown. In October 1801, Harriet was left in the care of Reverend James Barrett, a priest of the Church of Ireland, parish of Drumcliffe. Barrett became her guardian and brought her up as though she were his own daughter. He instructed her "in the precepts of religion," and kept everything connected with the stage from her view. After Barrett's death on 16 February 1808, the Smithsons sent Harriet to a boarding school in Waterford.

== Acting career ==
=== Irish beginning ===
On 27 May 1814, Smithson made her first stage appearance at the Theatre Royal (Dublin), as Albina Mandevill in Frederick Reynolds's The Will. Her performance was well received, and the Freeman's Journal gave her a positive review.

She certainly is a most interesting and promising young actress, and there is no doubt she would prove a great acquisition to Crow-street, in the line of performance which her taste, as well as her talents, incline her to pursue.

In 1815, Smithson took her parents' place in Montague Talbot's company in Belfast after they returned to Dublin. The season opened on 1 January 1816, where she extended her range in roles, performing in multiple comedies. She then travelled to Newry, Limerick, Dublin, and Burmingham, where she joined Robert Elliston's company. She spent the next two months playing over forty roles in various genres.

=== Debut in London ===
By the time she reached her twenties, she had moved to London, where she began to gain recognition for her roles in various Shakespearean plays. Smithson's portrayal of Ophelia in "Hamlet" was particularly well-received, and she quickly became a beloved figure in the theatrical community.

Four years later, 20 January 1818, Smithson made her first London appearance at Drury Lane as Letitia Hardy in The Belle's Stratagem. Her first performance received mixed reviews from critics, but she quickly gained the favour of critics and performers as she obtained more experience. She joined the permanent company at the Royal Coburg later that year. However, she rejoined Drury Lane Company in the autumn of 1820. On 20 February 1821, she took the lead female role in Thérèse by John Howard Payne, when the cast actress fell ill. Overall, the London public remembered her as The Times put it, "a face and features well adapted to her profession; but [an actress] not likely to make a great impression on a London audience, or to figure among stars of the first magnitude."

=== Success in Paris ===
In 1827, Smithson made her Paris début as Lydia Languish in The Rivals at the Odéon theatre. Though she received negative reviews for this role, she was highly praised for her beauty and ability in the subsequent performance of She Stoops to Conquer. On 11 September 1827, she was given the part of Ophelia next to Charles Kemble in Shakespeare's Hamlet, which was when Hector Berlioz first saw her. She left a long-lasting impression on the French through her interpretation of Ophelia's madness, utilizing pantomime and natural presentation.

Miss Smithson acted the scene in which, robbed of her sanity, she takes her own veil to be her father's body with utmost grace and truth. The whole passage which seemed long and relatively insignificant and even exaggerated in reading, had tremendous impact on stage…The most remarkable feature of her acting is her pantomime; she adopts fantastic postures; and she uses the dying fall in her inflections, without ever ceasing to be natural…

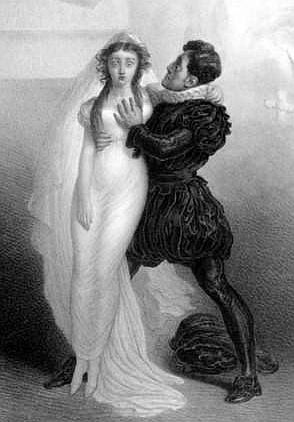
Charles Kemble and Harriet Smithson as Romeo and Juliet

The tremendous success of Hamlet led to that of Romeo & Juliet, for 15 September. Smithson was cast as Juliet, where she revolutionized the women's role in theatre by becoming as important as her male counterpart, Romeo. Until this point, women's lines in theatre were heavily cut and censored to reduce the role for the company's "restricted talent." Again, the production was widely well received.

Miss Smithson was charged with the role of Juliet, and she was excellent in it. It was in the scene in the second act, where she has a night meeting with Romeo, that her acting began to attract the audience's attention. This scene is extremely beautiful, even though it is written with a studied refinement...Miss Smithson could not have been more graceful upon the balcony; her posture were full of truth, grace, and love...In her strong moments, she is no longer a woman, but a Fury or something approaching that...

On 18 September, Shakespeare's Othello became the third Shakespeare tragedy to be performed by The English Theatre. Her performance as Desdemona was less effective, but the production was popular enough to be repeated the week after.

The English Theatre replaced the productions of tragedies with comedies, such as The Belle's Stratagem, The School for Scandal, Mrs. Centlivre's The Wonder, and Mrs. Cowley's The Weathercock. However, press's demand for more tragedies led to the production of The Tragedy of Jane Shore. In this renowned tragedy, Smithson was cast as Shore, the role in which she moved her audience to tears. The production soon became the most performed play in the English season. At the end of her time in France, she acted in several productions with famous actors such as William Charles Macready, Edmund Kean, and Charles Kemble.

Smithson became famous for her natural presentation of characters, striking pantomime, and beauty. She introduced the French to natural English theatrical techniques that allowed her to become her characters instead of simply portraying them. The new acting style, emphasizing drama and truth, which appealed to the French Romantics, prevailed over traditional French Classicists' idea of great acting. Soon, many French actresses started to imitate her method.

=== Back in London ===
As opportunities to continue her work in Paris dwindled, Smithson returned to London to perform Jane Shore again. The production opened at Covent Garden on 11 May 1829 under unfavorable circumstances. Some audience members, who had read her reviews before she went to Paris, felt reluctant to attend the show. Furthermore, the London press was anxious to prove that their previous reviews of her average acting were accurate. Newspapers such as the Examiner gave the first performance a begrudging review:

Her action is easy and graceful though somewhat redundant. Her declamation and studied choice of attitudes show that she has been a careful student in the French school of High tragedy. Her voice from a peculiarity in its intonation has a monotonous effect…

However, just seven days after her next performance as Juliet, in Shakespeare's Romeo and Juliet, the press, including The Examiner, gave her glowing reviews:

Miss Smithson's performance of Juliet, take it as a whole, is by many degrees the best we have seen since the days of Miss O'Neil…She is the best tragic actress now in London.

She appeared as Belvidera in Venice Preserved and as Mrs. Simpson in Simpson and Co on the Lincoln Circuit at the Peterborough theatre between 27 June and 2 July 1831. After Covent Garden closed for the summer in 1832, Smithson toured minor theatres in England, performing almost exclusively in tragedies. In June 1832, she joined the Theatre Royal, Haymarket, where she had limited success and received criticism about her weight.

=== End of career ===
In 1830, Smithson went back to Paris to set up an English theatre under her own management. She obtained permission to perform at the Theatre-Italien where she performed several unsuccessful plays. A year later, she broke her leg and was forced to put her career on hold until her leg healed. She was now in great debt, yet her mother and sister still depended on her for support. She gave her last performance, as Ophelia, on 15 December 1836, before her health deteriorated.

== As a muse ==
Smithson's genuine portrayal of her characters led to her fame and elusiveness. Before Smithson, tragedy was considered primarily a man's realm. Her distinctly genuine, almost grotesque, interpretation of characters made way for subsequent actresses in tragedies. In this way, she set the standard of great acting for all actors.

Smithson's excellent acting muddled perceptions of her personality with those of her female characters. At the height of her career, she became the figurehead for the French Romantic movement. The many French Romantic pieces of art, plays, music, and written works she had inspired depicted her as Ophelia, Juliet, and Harriet. The most famous of these works was Hector Berlioz's Symphonie Fantastique. After Berlioz saw Smithson as Ophelia in 1827, he became infatuated with her, or rather with "a dramatic image [of a woman] lent force by supreme art of Shakespeare and intensity by a highly charged occasion and performance." His obsession prompted him to compose the Symphonie Fantastique, which is known as the first great romantic symphony.

== Marriage to Hector Berlioz ==
Berlioz discovered Smithson at the Odéon Theatre performing the roles of Juliet Capulet and Ophelia and immediately fell in love with her. He persistently sent her letters despite never having met her. For a brief period, he lived in an apartment whence he could see her return home and watch her until she went to sleep. She ignored all of his advances until 1832, when she was invited to a performance of Lélio, a sequel to his Symphonie Fantastique, by a mutual friend. She realized that the symphony was about her and sent Berlioz a message congratulating him. Berlioz quickly received permission to meet her, and they became lovers. Despite her quiet reluctance and the opposition of both families and friends, they were married at the British Embassy in Paris on 3 October 1833. Louis, the couple's only child, was born on 14 August 1834.

Smithson soon became resentful and jealous of Berlioz as his musical success distanced him from her. As she became increasingly possessive and ill, Berlioz began an affair with Marie Recio, a singer at the Paris Opera, who was to be Berlioz' second wife. Smithson eventually moved out of the matrimonial home on the rue Saint Vincent, Montmartre, to the rue Blanche in 1843, but was still financially supported by Berlioz.

== Death ==
Smithson came close to death several times before she died, namely from a shooting incident in her garden, where the bullet missed her, and then from the first of many strokes to come. After four additional strokes and an "illness attributed to the cholera epidemic," Smithson suffered from increasingly declining health, including paralysis, which left her barely able to move or speak. She could only answer simple yes or no questions, and at the very end of her life was unable to even cry—although she did cry when Berlioz brought in a portrait of her from her glory days. Smithson thanked Berlioz "for the sorrow it had caused her...can there be such sweetness in regrets and memories?" She died on 3 March 1854, at her home on the rue Saint-Vincent, and was buried at the Cimetière Saint-Vincent. Berlioz later had her body reinterred at the Montmartre cemetery when Saint-Vincent's was to be redeveloped.

== Theatric roles ==
Year	Title	Role	Playwright
1814	The Will	Albina Mandevill	Frederick Reynolds
1816	The School for Scandal	Lady Teazle	Richard Brinsley Sheridan
1816	Laugh When You Can	Mrs. Mortimer	Frederick Reynolds
1816	Lover's Vows	Amelia	Elizabeth Inchbald
1816	The Mountaineers	Floranthe	George Coleman
1816	The Stranger	Mrs. Haller	August von Kotzebue
1827	Ben Nazir, the Saracen	Bathilda	Thomas Colley Grattan

== Art of Harriet Smithson ==
Media related to Harriet Smithson at Wikimedia Commons

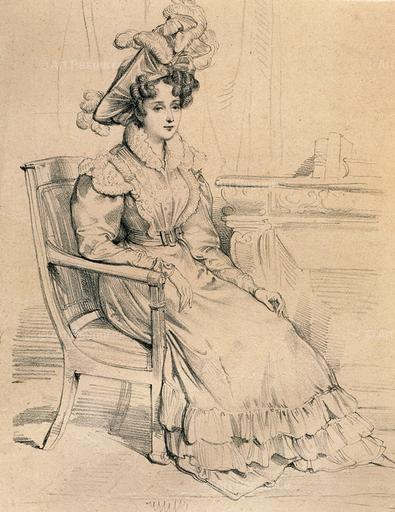
Harriet Smithson, by Eugene Deveria, Musée Hector-Berlioz (maison natale) La Côte-Saint-André

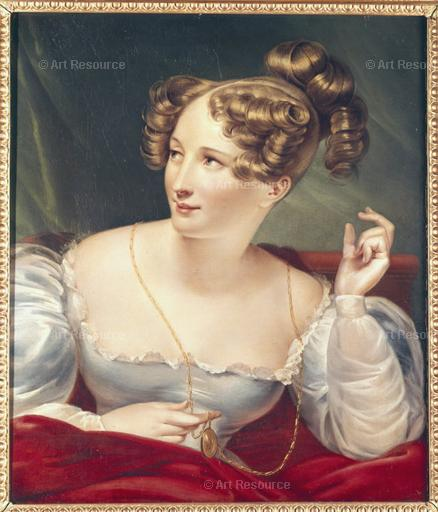
Harriet Smithson in 1832. Artist unknown.

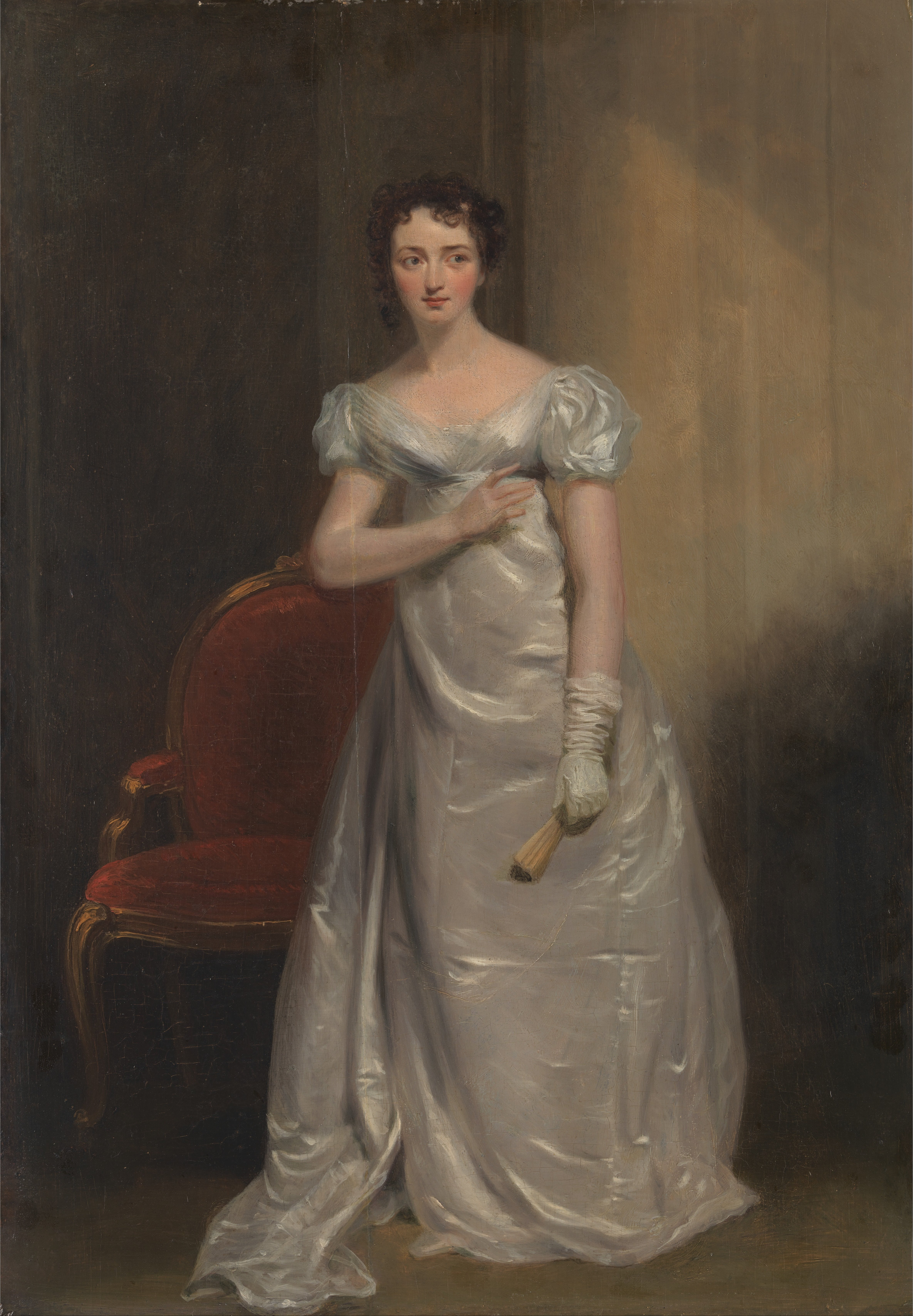
Harriet Smithson, by George Clint, as Miss Dorillon, in "Wives as They Were, and Maids as They Are"
Miss H. Smithson in the caracter of Ophélia - Éditeur : chez Martinet rue du Coq S.t Honoré (Paris), Martinet rue du Coq St Honoré - Bibliothèque nationale de France, département Musique

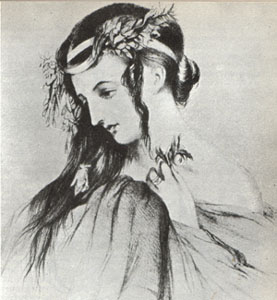
Harriet Smithson, artist unknown

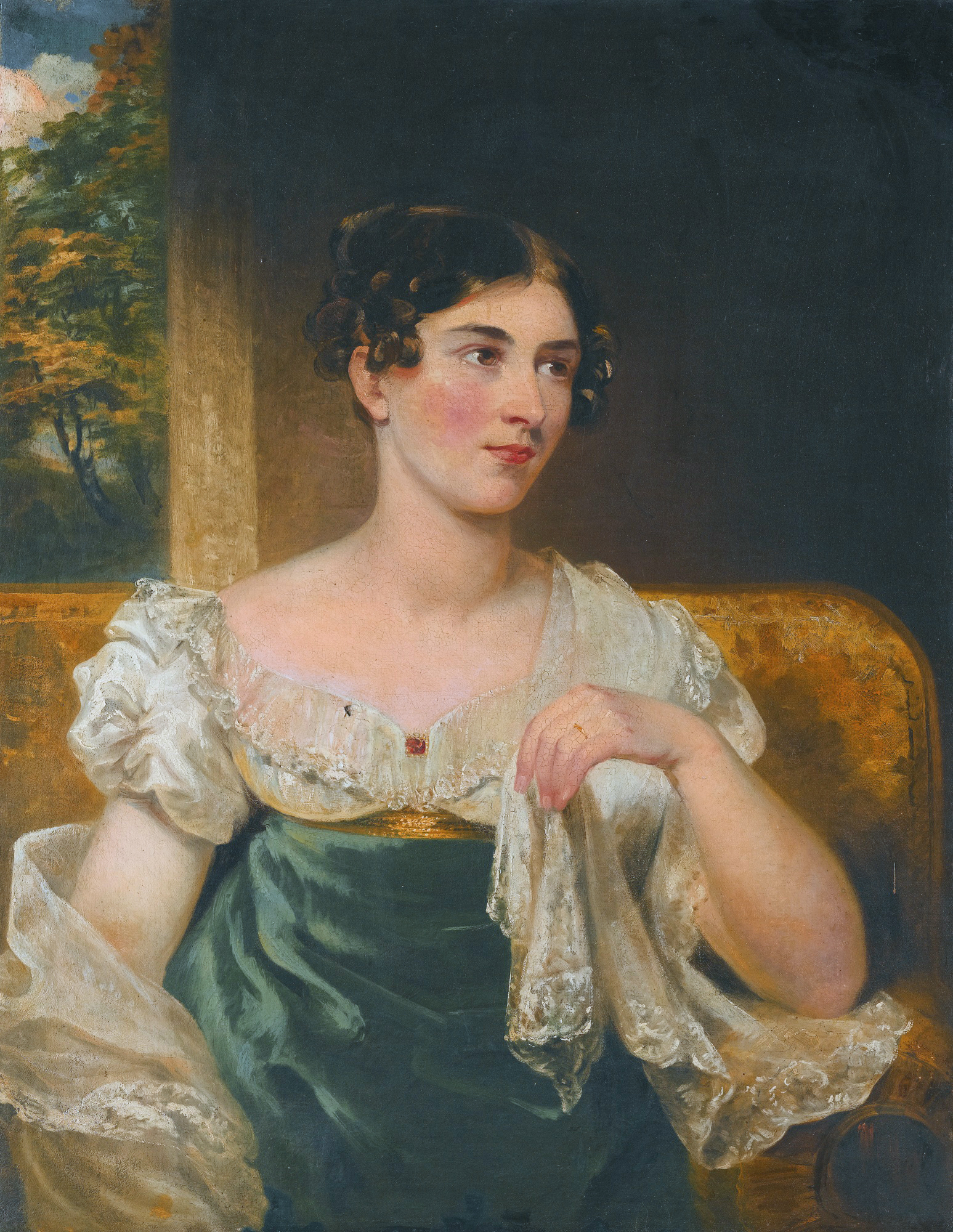
Harriet Smithson, by George Clint

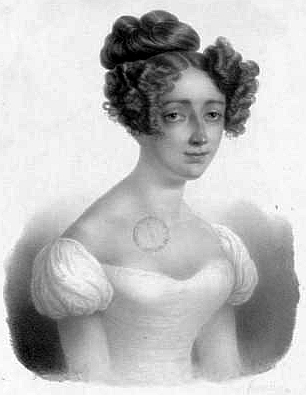
Harriet Smithson by Francis-Antoine Conscience

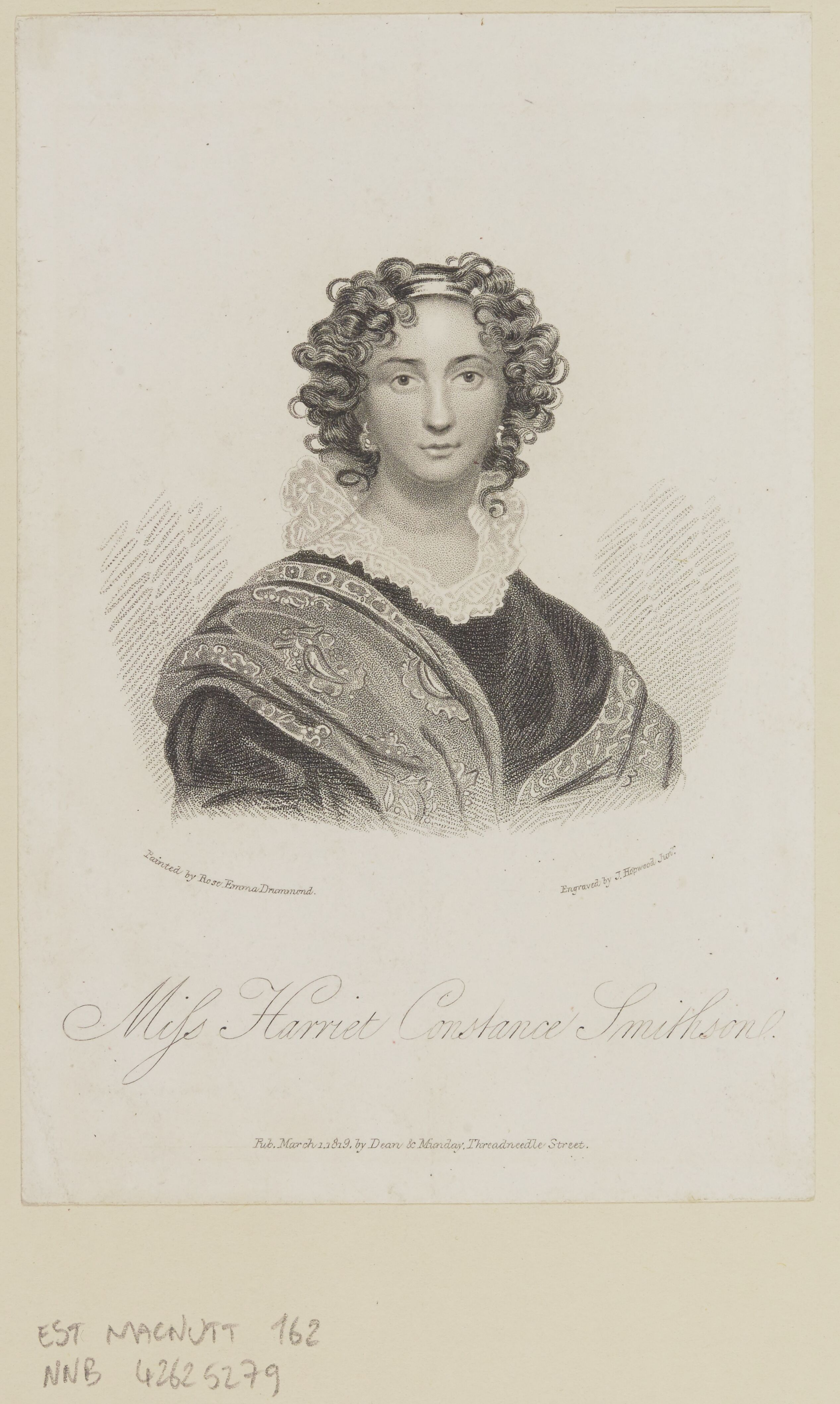
Engraving of Harriet Smithson by J. Hopwood, after a painting by Rose Emma Drummond
