= Prix de Rome cantatas (Berlioz) =

Cantatas by Berlioz

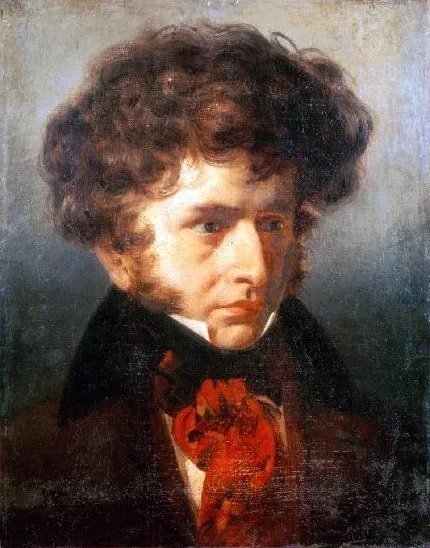
Berlioz portrayed in 1832

The French composer Hector Berlioz made four attempts at winning the Prix de Rome music prize, finally succeeding in 1830. As part of the competition, he had to write a cantata to a text set by the examiners. Berlioz's efforts to win the prize are described at length in his Memoirs. He regarded it as the first stage in his struggle against the musical conservatism represented by the judges, who included established composers such as Luigi Cherubini, François-Adrien Boieldieu and Henri-Montan Berton. Berlioz's stay in Italy as a result of winning the prize also had a great influence on later works such as Benvenuto Cellini and Harold en Italie. The composer subsequently destroyed the scores of two cantatas (Orphée and Sardanapale) almost completely and reused music from all four of them in later works. There was a revival of interest in the cantatas in the late 20th century, particularly Cléopâtre, which has become a favourite showcase for the soprano and mezzo-soprano voice.

== Berlioz and the Prix de Rome ==
The Prix de Rome was an award for composers allowing the winner to spend a year studying at the Villa Medici in Rome. It also entitled him to a five-year pension. The prize was adjudicated by the Paris Conservatoire. Entrants had to submit a fugue as proof of their compositional skills and the four successful candidates were then required to write a dramatic cantata to a text chosen by the judges.

== The cantatas ==
The four cantatas are:

=== La Mort d'Orphée ===
La Mort d'Orphée (The Death of Orpheus) (1827), text by Berton. For tenor, chorus and orchestra. Result: failed.

=== Herminie ===
Herminie (Erminia) (1828), text by Pierre-Ange Vieillard. For soprano and orchestra. Result: second prize.

1. Recitative: Quel trouble te poursuit, malheureuse Herminie!
2. Aria: Ah! si de la tendresse
3. Recitative: Que dis-je?
4. Aria: Arrête! Arrête! Cher Tancrède
5. Aria: Venez! Venez! Terribles armes! -and prayer: Dieu des chrétiens, toi que j'ignore

The theme from the first movement was later used as the idée fixe in the Symphonie fantastique of 1830.

=== Cléopâtre ===
Cléopâtre (Cleopatra) (1829), text by Pierre-Ange Vieillard. For soprano and orchestra. Result: no first prize awarded.

=== Sardanapale ===
Sardanapale (Sardanapalus) (1830), text by Jean François Gail. For tenor, chorus and orchestra. Result: joint first prize.

== Recordings ==
=== All four cantatas ===
- Cantatas: Béatrice Uria-Monzon (Cléopâtre), Michèle Lagrange (Herminie), Daniel Galvez-Vallejo (La Mort d'Orphée, La Mort de Sardanapale). Chœur régional Nord-Pas-de-Calais, Orchestre National de Lille, Jean-Claude Casadesus cond. (Harmonia Mundi, 10/1994 & 11/1995)

=== Herminie ===
- Herminie (with Les Nuits d'été): Mireille Delunsch, Paris Champs-Elysées Orchestra, Philippe Herreweghe cond. (Harmonia Mundi)
- Herminie (with Symphonie fantastique): Aurélia Legay, Mahler Chamber Orchestra / Les Musiciens du Louvre, Marc Minkowski cond.
- Herminie (with Cléopâtre): Janet Baker, London Symphony Orchestra, Sir Colin Davis cond. (Philips, 1979)

=== Cléopâtre ===
- Cléopâtre (with Harold en Italie): Jennie Tourel, New York Philharmonic Orchestra, Leonard Bernstein cond. (CBS, rec. 10/1961)
- Cléopâtre (with Sara la Baigneuse, Méditation religieuse, La Mort d'Orphée): Anne Pashley, English Chamber Orchestra, Sir Colin Davis cond. (Oiseau-Lyre, rec. 1967)
- Cléopâtre (with other works by Berlioz): Janet Baker, London Symphony Orchestra, Sir Alexander Gibson cond. (EMI, rec. 09/1969)
- Cléopâtre (with works by various composers): Marilyn Tyler, Rotterdam Philharmonic Orchestra, Jean Fournet cond. (Radio Nederland, rec. 1973)
- Cléopâtre (with Les Nuits d'été): Yvonne Minton, BBC Symphony Orchestra, Pierre Boulez cond. (CBS, rec. 09/1976)
- Cléopâtre (with Herminie and 5 songs): Janet Baker, London Symphony Orchestra, Sir Colin Davis cond. (Philips, rec. 03/1979)
- Cléopâtre (with Les Troyens à Carthage, excerpts): Nadine Denize, Nouvel Orchestre philharmonique de Radio France, Gilbert Amy cond. (Erato, rec. 1980)
- Cléopâtre (with Les Nuits d'été): Jessye Norman, Orchestre de Paris, Daniel Barenboim cond. (DGG, rec. 04/1981)
- Cléopâtre (with Symphonie funèbre et triomphale): Dunja Vejzović, Czech Philharmonic Orchestra, Christoph Eschenbach cond. (Supraphon, rec. 01/1988)
- Cléopâtre (with Herminie and orchestral works by Berlioz): Rosalind Plowright, Philharmonia Orchestra, Jean-Philippe Rouchon cond. (ASV, 1994)
- Cléopâtre (with Les Nuits d'été): Véronique Gens, Orchestre de l'Opéra National de Lyon, Louis Langrée cond. (Virgin, rec. 06/2000)
- Cléopâtre (with Symphonie fantastique): Olga Borodina, Wiener Philharmoniker, Valery Gergiev cond. (Philips, rec. 05/2003)
- Cléopâtre (with works by Barber, Ravel and Britten): Jennifer Larmore, Grant Park Orchestra, Carlos Kalmar cond. (Cedille Records, rec. 08/2006)
- Cléopâtre (with Symphonie fantastique): Susan Graham, Berliner Philharmoniker, Sir Simon Rattle cond. (EMI, rec. 06/2008)
- Cléopâtre (with Symphonie fantastique): Anna Caterina Antonacci, Rotterdam Philharmonic Orchestra, Yannick Nézet-Séguin cond. (BIS, rec. 03/2010)
- Cléopâtre (with Les Nuits d'été): Karen Cargill, Scottish Chamber Orchestra, Robin Ticciati cond. (Linn, rec. 04/2012)
- Cléopâtre (with Herminie and La Captive): Lisa Larsson, Het Gelders Orkest, Antonello Manacorda cond. (Challenge Classics, rec. 05/2013)
- Cléopâtre (with Harold en Italie): Karen Cargill, London Symphony Orchestra, Valeriĭ Gergiev cond. (LSO Live, rec. 11/2013)

== Sources ==
- David Cairns: Berlioz: The Making of an Artist (the first volume of his biography of the composer) (André Deutsch, 1989)
- Hugh Macdonald: Berlioz ("The Master Musicians", J.M.Dent, 1982)
- Berlioz: Memoirs (Dover, 1960)
