= Kerry Murphy =

Kerry Murphy may refer to:

- Kerry Murphy (musicologist), Australian musicologist
- Kerry Murphy (American football) (born 1988), American football player
