= Barbara L. Kelly =

Scottish-Irish musicologist

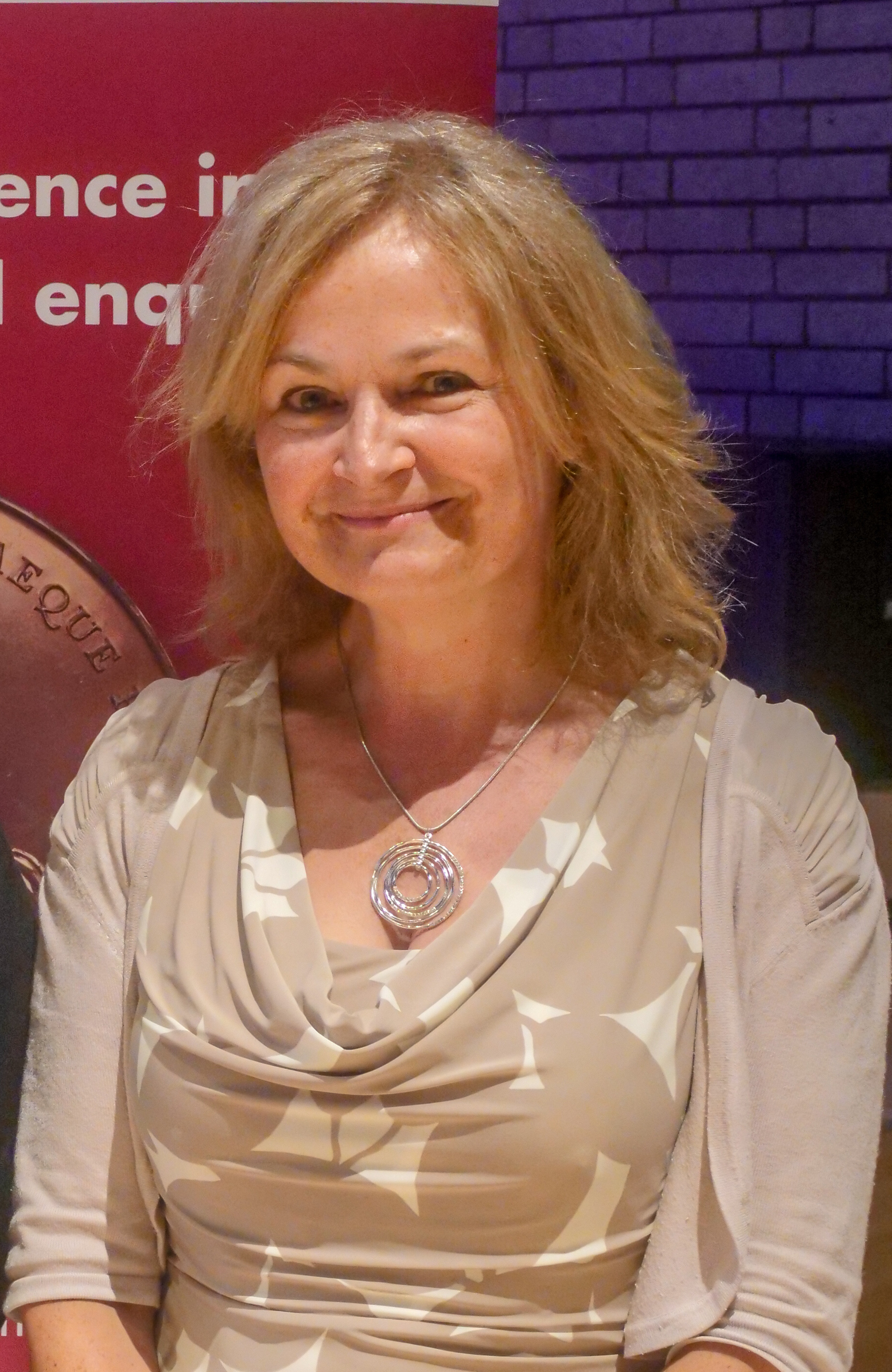
- Kelly in 2019
- Born: Barbara Lucy Kelly; 2 June 1966 (age 60); Edinburgh, Scotland
- Occupation: Musicologist

Barbara Lucy Kelly (born 2 June 1966) is a British musicologist specializing in 19th- and early 20th-century French music, an area in which she is widely regarded as a leading authority. She has dual United Kingdom and Irish citizenship. She is the Head of School of Music and Professor of Music at the University of Leeds and is currently the first female President of the Royal Musical Association (2021–2023).

== Career ==
Kelly was born in Edinburgh, the youngest of four children of parents of Irish and Scottish heritage. Her father's family came from Galway and Dublin, and her mother's came a generation earlier from County Mayo. A talented child singer who sang a solo before Queen Elizabeth II on her silver jubilee visit to Edinburgh in 1977, Kelly entered St Mary's Music School where she started with the violin, followed by four years in the junior department of the Royal Scottish Academy of Music and Drama, Glasgow.

From 1984 to 1988, Kelly studied music and English at the University of Glasgow, where she developed a love for Fin de siècle and early 20th-century French and Russian music. This motivated her to study with French music experts, initially with David Grayson at the University of Illinois Urbana-Champaign (Master's in Musicology, 1992), and subsequently with Robert Orledge at the University of Liverpool (PhD, 1994), writing her thesis on Darius Milhaud and the French Musical Tradition.

In September 1993, Kelly was appointed Lecturer in Music and Senior Course Tutor at University College Scarborough (today part of the University of Hull). In January 1995, she became Lecturer in Music at Keele University where she was promoted to Senior Lecturer (2002–8), Programme Director for Music (2007–11), and finally Professor of Music in March 2008. In addition, she was Head of Humanities Research at the Research Institute for the Humanities and Social Sciences (2012–4) and Faculty Research Director, Faculty of Humanities and Social Sciences (2014–5) at Keele. Remaining a visiting professor at Keele, Kelly was then appointed Director of Research at the Royal Northern College of Music (RNCM) in Manchester in April 2015. In November 2022, she took up the post of Head of School of Music and Professor of Music at the University of Leeds.

Among her external activities, in 2016, she was a "Professeur invité" at the Université de Paris-Sorbonne. Kelly has been a regular external examiner at Liverpool Hope University College (1999–2003), the University of Limerick, Mary Immaculate College (2004–8), and the University of Leeds (2005–9), and acted as a Specialist Postgraduate External at the RNCM (2007–13). Other doctoral examining roles have led her to a wide range of universities in Australia, Canada, France, England, and Malta. She is a member of a number of research groups, including the international steering group of France: Musiques, Cultures, 1789–1918 and Music and Nation (Musique et nation); she is on the Scientific Advisory Board of the Institut de Recherche en Musicologie (IReMus).

In October 2020, Kelly was elected to the Academia Europaea.

== Research interests ==
Kelly specializes in late 19th- and early 20th-century French music and cultural history. She has published on composers including Darius Milhaud, Claude Debussy, Maurice Ravel, Arthur Honegger, Francis Poulenc, and Igor Stravinsky as well as on issues such as music and war, national and religious identity, and anti-Semitism in France.

Based on her 1994 doctoral thesis and subsequent research, her first monograph, Tradition and Style in the Works of Darius Milhaud (1912–1939) (2003), was preceded by a number of articles in books and journals, not least important biographical entries in the 2001 edition of the New Grove Dictionary of Music and Musicians, including the one on Ravel. The study covers the musical development and aesthetics of Milhaud between 1912 and the composer's emigration at the outbreak of World War II, with insights into his early works, national and religious influences, and rarely performed compositions. The book has been hailed as "a magnificent contribution to the study of the work and aesthetics of Darius Milhaud, and [...] enlarging it in concentric circles, it helps to better understand the group Les Six, the emergence of neoclassicism in France, and the music of the inter-war period".

Kelly's second monograph, Music and Ultra-Modernism in France: A Fragile Consensus (1913–1939) (2013), deals with three generational groupings of French composers: Ravel and his circle, Les Six in the 1920s, and La Jeune France (founded 1936). The book has been lauded for the attention it pays to composers beyond the Debussy–Ravel–Satie narrative, including, beyond the members of those groups, Georges Migot. By also including the views of opinion-leading music critics of the period, the "book provides a detailed survey of how French music was presented in the press. By interrogating the contemporaneous discourse, including writing by composers, Kelly adds to the dynamic understanding of the period".

In three (co-)edited volumes, Kelly has further strengthened her research profile. Together with Australian musicologist Kerry Murphy, she produced a 2007 publication comparing the impact of Berlioz and Debussy. 2008 saw the publication of French Music, Culture, and National Identity, 1870–1939, including twelve essays in three sections resulting from a conference she had organized at Keele University, described as "a distinguished collection of essays that will support and influence research on the fin-de-siècle for some time".

In Music Criticism in France: Authority, Advocacy, Legacy (1918–1939) (2018), edited by Kelly together with Canadian musicologist Christopher Moore, the various authors describe how the reception of composers like Charles Koechlin, Arthur Honegger, Nadia Boulanger, or Erik Satie was shaped by contemporary and near-contemporary music critics. The volume was welcomed as "the first detailed study of its kind [...] a thought-provoking and highly variegated impression of the roles and activities of French music criticism in the 1920s and 30s".

As a form of public engagement, Kelly is also active as a radio broadcaster in programmes for the BBC focusing on French art music.

== Selected publications ==
=== Monographs ===
- Tradition and Style in the Works of Darius Milhaud (1912–1939) (Aldershot: Ashgate, 2003), ISBN 978-0-75463-033-3.
- Music and Ultra-Modernism in France: A Fragile Consensus (1913–1939) (Woodbridge: Boydell and Brewer, 2013), ISBN 978-1-84383-810-4.
- (with Deborah Mawer, Rachel Moore, and Graham Sadler) Accenting the Classics: Editing European Music in France, 1915–1925 (Woodbridge: Boydell and Brewer, 2023), ISBN 978-1-83765-032-3.

=== Edited volumes ===
- (with Kerry Murphy) Berlioz and Debussy. Sources, Contexts and Legacies (Aldershot: Ashgate, 2007), ISBN 978-1-13826-298-0.
- French Music, Culture, and National Identity, 1870–1939 (Rochester, New York: University of Rochester Press, 2008), ISBN 978-1-58046-272-3.
- (with Christopher Moore) Music Criticism in France: Authority, Advocacy, Legacy (1918–1939) (Woodbridge: Boydell, 2018), ISBN 978-1-78327-251-8.
- (with Sarah Collins and Laura Tunbridge) "A 'Musical League of Nations'? Music Institutions and the Politics of Internationalism between the Wars", roundtable in Journal of the Royal Musical Association volume 147 number 2 (2022).
- (with Anaïs Fléchet, Martin Guerpin, and Philippe Gumplowicz) Music and Postwar Transitions in the 19th and 20th Centuries (New York: Berghahn Books, 2023), ISBN 978-1-80073-894-2.

=== Articles ===
- (with Silvano Levy) "E. L. T. Mesens' Renouncement of Music", in: French Studies Bulletin (October 1994), pages 13–15.
- "Time Present, Past and Future in the Writings and Practice of Milhaud; Comparisons with Stravinsky and Eliot", in: The Maynooth International Musicological Conference 1995. Selected Proceedings Part Two (= Irish Musical Studies volume 5) ed. Patrick F. Devine and Harry White (Dublin: Four Courts Press, 1996), pages 294–320.
- (with Silvano Levy) "Dangerous Music: Belgian Theories of Musical Surrealism", in: Aura (Spring 1996), pages 72–85.
- "Milhaud's Alissa Manuscripts (1913 and 1931)", in: Journal of the Royal Musical Association (December 1996), pages 229–245.
- "History and Homage", in: The Cambridge Companion to Ravel, ed. Deborah Mawer (Cambridge: Cambridge University Press, 2000), pages 7–26.
- "Henri Busser"; "Paul Claudel"; "Raoul Gunsbourg"; "Tibor Harsanyi"; "Jean Huré"; "André Jolivet"; "E. L. T. Mesens"; "Maurice Ravel"; "Jean Rivier"; "Jean Roger-Ducasse"; "Antoine Tisné"; "Marguerite Béclard d’Harcourt"; in: The New Grove Dictionary of Music and Musicians, ed. Stanley Sadie (London: Macmillan, 2001).
- "The Paris of Debussy", in The Cambridge Companion to Debussy, ed. Simon Trezise (Cambridge: Cambridge University Press, 2003), pages 25–42.
- "Vies parasites du poète: art et recyclage dans Julien de Charpentier", in: Le Naturalisme sur la scène lyrique, ed. Jean-Christophe Branger and Alban Ramaut (St. Etienne: Publications de l'Université de Saint-Etienne, 2004), pages 271–284.
- "Ravel after Debussy: Inheritance, Influences and Style", in: Berlioz and Debussy: Sources, Contexts and Legacies, ed. B. Kelly and K. Murphy (Aldershot: Ashgate, 2007), pages 167–180.
- "The Roles of Music and Culture in National Identity Formation", in: French Music, Culture, and National Identity, 1870–1939, ed. B. Kelly (Rochester, New York: University of Rochester Press, 2008), pages 1–14.
- "Debussy and the Making of a musicien français: Pelléas, the Press and the First World War", in: French Music, Culture, and National Identity, 1870–1939 (as above), pages 58–76.
- "Guerrières, reines et collaborateurs: religion, politique et images et la France", in: Musique, arts et religion dans l'entre-deux-guerres, ed. Sylvain Caron and Michel Duchesneau (Lyon: Symétrie, 2009), pages 271–295.
- "Re-presenting Ravel: Artificiality and the Aesthetic of Imposture", in: Behind the Masks: New Perspectives on Ravel's Music, ed. Peter Kaminsky (Rochester, New York: Rochester University Press, 2011), pages 41–62.
- "Une étude de Ravel: époque, place et heritage, ou Ravel et "l'esthétique de l'imposture", in: Musique française, esthétique, identité en mutation, 1892–1992, ed. Pascal Terrien (Paris: Delatour, 2011), pages 161–172.
- "Originalité et tradition: Pelléas et la bataille pour la musique française (1902–1920)", in: Pelléas et Mélisande, ed. Denis Herlin, Sylvie Douche and Christopher Branger (Lyon: Symétrie, 2012), pages 113–124.
- "Remembering Debussy in Interwar France: Authority, Musicology and Legacy", in: Music and Letters, volume 93 number 2 (August 2012), pages 374–392.
- "Enjeux de mémoire après la mort de Debussy. Débats entre Prunières, Vallas et Vuillermoz", in: Regards sur Debussy: Actes du colloque international Claude Debussy, ed. Myriam Chimènes and Alexandre Laederich (Paris: Fayard, 2013), pages 401–420.
- "Milhaud et Ravel: affinités, antipathies et les esthétiques musicales françaises", in: Regards croisés sur Darius Milhaud, ed. Jacinthe Harbec and Marie-Noelle Lavoie (Paris: Vrin, 2015), pages 133–152.
- "L'Affaire Prunières-Vallas", in: Henry Prunières (1886–1942): un musicologue engagé de l'entre-deux-guerres, ed. Myriam Chimènes, Florence Gétreau et Catherine Massip (Lyon: Symétrie, 2015), pages v311–328.
- "Poulenc et Stravinsky: influence musicale, crise ou complicité?", in: Du Langage au style: singularités de Francis Poulenc, ed. Lucie Kayas and Hervé Lacombe (Lyon: Smétrie, 2016), pages 159–172.
- "Ravel's Late Styles", in: Late Style and its Discontents, ed. Gordon McMullan and Sam Smiles (Oxford: Oxford University Press, 2016), pages 158–173.
- (with Rebecca Thumpston) "Maintaining the Entente Cordiale. Musicological Collaboration between the United Kingdom and France", in: Revue de musicologie, volume 103 (2017), number 2, pages 615–640.
- "Fashioning Early Debussy in Interwar France", in: Debussy’s Resonance, eds. François de Médicis, Michel Duchesneau and Steven Huebner (Rochester, New York: Rochester University Press, 2018), pages 559–579.
- "Common Canon, Conflicting Ideologies: Music Criticism in Performance in Interwar France" in: Music Criticism in France: Authority, Advocacy, Legacy (1918–1939), ed. Barbara L. Kelly and Christopher Moore (Woodbridge: Boydell Press, 2018), pages 121–149.
- "Reflecting the Public Appetite in Text and Music: Debussy's Act of Wartime Propaganda", in Over Here, Over There: Transatlantic Conversations on the Music of World War I, ed. by William Brooks, Christina Bashford and Gayle Magee (Champaign, Illinois: University of Illinois Press, 2019), pages 58–72.
- "Musical Innovation and Collaboration during the First World War: Jane Bathori at the Vieux-Colombier", in: Créer, jouer, transmettre la musique de la IIIe République à nos jours. Pour Myriam Chimènes, ed. Alexandra Laedrich (Lyon: Symétrie, 2019), pages 69–81.
- "French Connections: Debussy and Ravel's Orchestral Music in Britain from Prélude à l'après-midi d'un faune to Boléro", in: The Symphonic Poem in Britain, c.1850–1940: Texts and Contexts, ed. Michael Allis and Paul Watt (Woodbridge: Boydell, 2020), pages 115–146.
- "Une entente cordiale en musique: The Chesterian dans l'entre-deux-guerres", in: La Critique musicale au XXe siècle, ed. Timothée Picard (Rennes: Presses Universitaires de Rennes, 2020), pages 1045–1054.
- "Between Salzburg and London: The 1923 and 1924 Festivals / Zwischen Salzburg und London: Die Feste 1923 & 1924", in: Achtung International! Salzburg & 100 Years of the International Society for Contemporary Music, ed. Matthew Werley (Vienna: Hollitzer Verlag, 2023), pages 112–122.

=== Radio programmes ===
- Pavane pour une infante défunte, by Maurice Ravel (3 March 2023; link).
- Composer of the Week: Germaine Tailleferre (1892-1983) (undated; link).
- Twenty Minutes: Ravel's Paris (undated; link).
- Tales from the Staves: Debussy's La Mer (26 June 2018; link).
