= Hector Berlioz as critic and author =

The composer Hector Berlioz was a prolific writer who supported himself early in his career by writing musical criticism using a bold, vigorous style, at times imperious and sarcastic. Criticism was an activity "at which he excelled but which he abhorred". Despite his complaints, Berlioz continued writing music criticism for most of his life, long after he had any financial need to do so.

== Criticism ==
Berlioz wrote for many journals, including the Rénovateur, Journal des débats and Gazette musicale. He was active in the Débats for over thirty years until submitting his last signed article in 1863. Almost from the founding, Berlioz was a key member of the editorial board of the Gazette, as well as a contributor, and acted as editor on several occasions while the owner was otherwise engaged. Berlioz took advantage of his times as editor, allowing himself to increase his articles written on music history rather than current events, evidenced by him publishing seven articles on Gluck in the Gazette between June 1834 and January 1835. He produced over one hundred articles for the Gazette between 1833 and 1837. This is a conservative estimate, as not all of his submissions were signed. In 1835 alone, during one of his many times of financial difficulty, he wrote four articles for the Monde dramatique, twelve for the Gazette, nineteen for the Débats and thirty-seven for the Rénovateur. These were in-depth articles and reviews.

Berlioz' devotion to journalistic integrity and even-handedness is exemplified in that, while the Gazette criticized Henri Herz for his seemingly endless stream of variations on opera themes, it also positively reviewed his music on occasion. The Gazette did not always praise Berlioz's music, although it always recognized him as an important and serious composer. The Revue musicale published many personal attacks against Berlioz written by critic François-Joseph Fétis. Robert Schumann published a detailed rebuttal of one of Fétis' attacks on Berlioz's Symphonie fantastique in his own Neue Zeitschrift für Musik journal. In writing reviews, Berlioz was able to indulge himself in attacking his bêtes noires and extolling his enthusiasms. The former included musical pedants, coloratura writing and singing, viola players who were merely incompetent violinists, inane libretti, and baroque counterpoint. He extravagantly praised Beethoven's symphonies, and Gluck's and Weber's operas, and scrupulously refrained from promoting his own compositions. Despite his complaints, Berlioz continued writing music criticism for most of his life, long after he had any financial need to do so. (Note: One reason why his duties as a reviewer took up so much of Berlioz's time was that he approached them with unusual conscientiousness, studying scores in great detail in advance of their performance, and attending rehearsals whenever possible.)

== Books ==
Two of the books by Berlioz were compiled from his journal articles. Les soirées de l’orchestre (Evenings with the Orchestra) (1852), a scathing satire of provincial musical life in 19th century France, and the Treatise on Instrumentation, a pedagogic work, were both serialised originally in the Gazette musicale. Many parts of the Mémoires (1870) were originally published in the Journal des débats, as well as Le monde illustré. The Mémoires paint a magisterial (if biased) portrait of the Romantic era through the eyes of one of its chief protagonists. Evenings with the Orchestra is more overtly fictional than his other two major books, but its basis in reality is its strength, making the stories it recounts all the funnier due to the ring of truth. W. H. Auden praises it, saying "To succeed in [writing these tales], as Berlioz most brilliantly does, requires a combination of qualities which is very rare, the many-faceted curiosity of the dramatist with the aggressively personal vision of the lyric poet." The work was closely studied by Gustav Mahler and Richard Strauss and served as the foundation for a subsequent textbook by Nikolai Rimsky-Korsakov, who, as a music student, attended the concerts Berlioz conducted in Moscow and Saint Petersburg.

== Sources ==
- Bent, Ian (2005). Music Analysis in the Nineteenth Century, Volume II – Hermeneutic Approaches. Cambridge: Cambridge University Press. ISBN 978-0-521-67347-1.
- Cairns, David (1999). Berlioz – Volume 2: Servitude and Greatness, 1832–1869. London: Allen Lane. ISBN 978-0-7139-9386-8.
- Murphy, Kerry (1998). "La critique musicale 1823–1863, Vol. I: 1823–1834". Journal of the Royal Musical Association. 123 (1): 107–115. doi:10.1017/S0269040300011245. JSTOR 766485. S2CID 221629720. (subscription required)
- Wright Roberts, William (January 1926). "Berlioz the Critic. I". Music & Letters. 7 (1): 63–72. doi:10.1093/ml/VII.1.63. JSTOR 726023. (subscription required)
- Wright Roberts, William (April 1926). "Berlioz the Critic. II". Music & Letters. 7 (2): 133–142. doi:10.1093/ml/VII.2.133. JSTOR 725865. (subscription required)
