= Marie Pleyel =

Belgian concert pianist

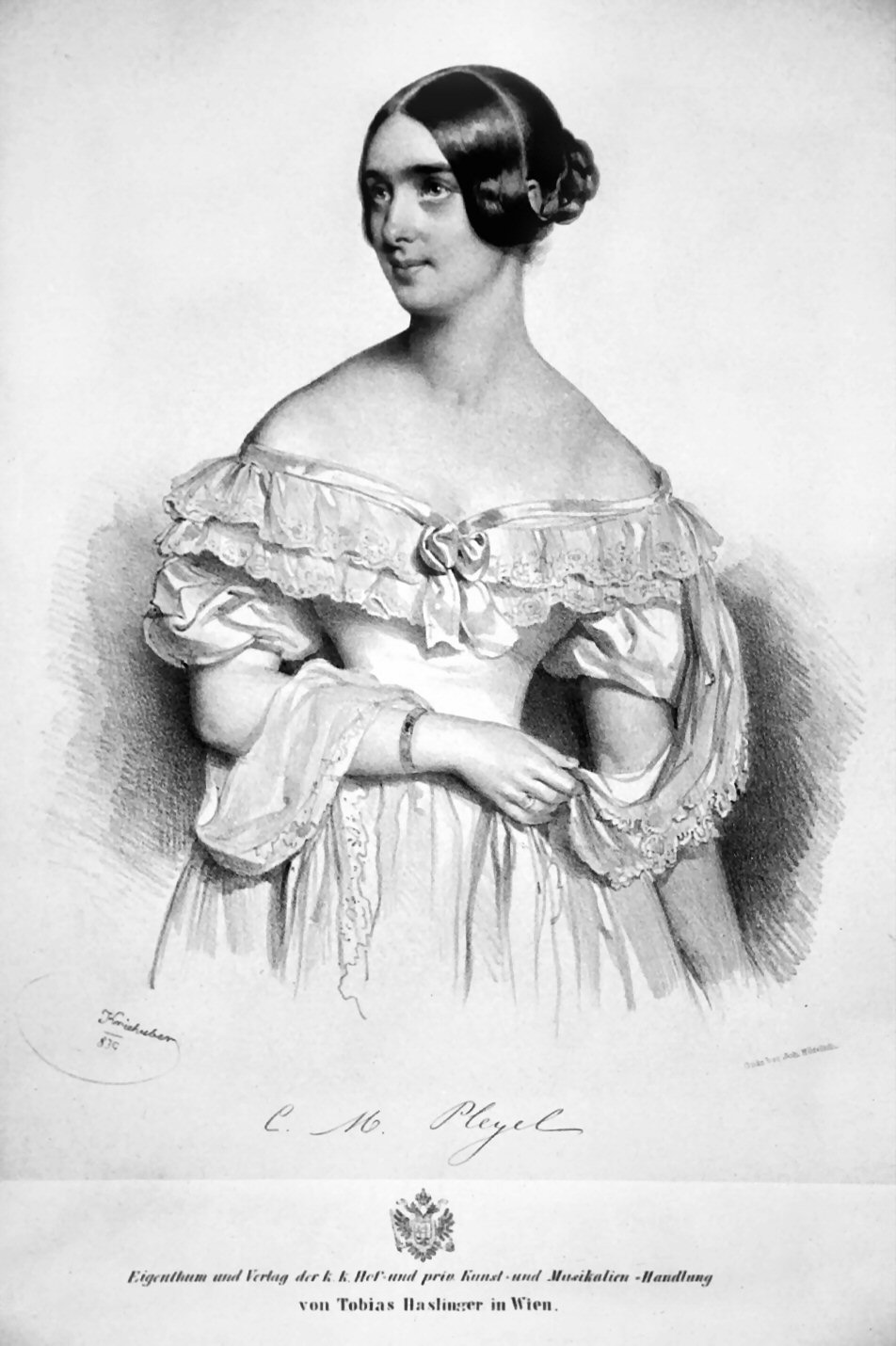
- Marie Moke-Pleyel (lithograph by Josef Kriehuber, 1839)
- Born: Marie-Félicité-Denise Moke; 4 July or 4 September 1811; Paris, France
- Died: 30 March 1875 (aged 63); Saint-Josse-ten-Noode, Belgium
- Occupation: Concert pianist
- Spouse: Camille Pleyel

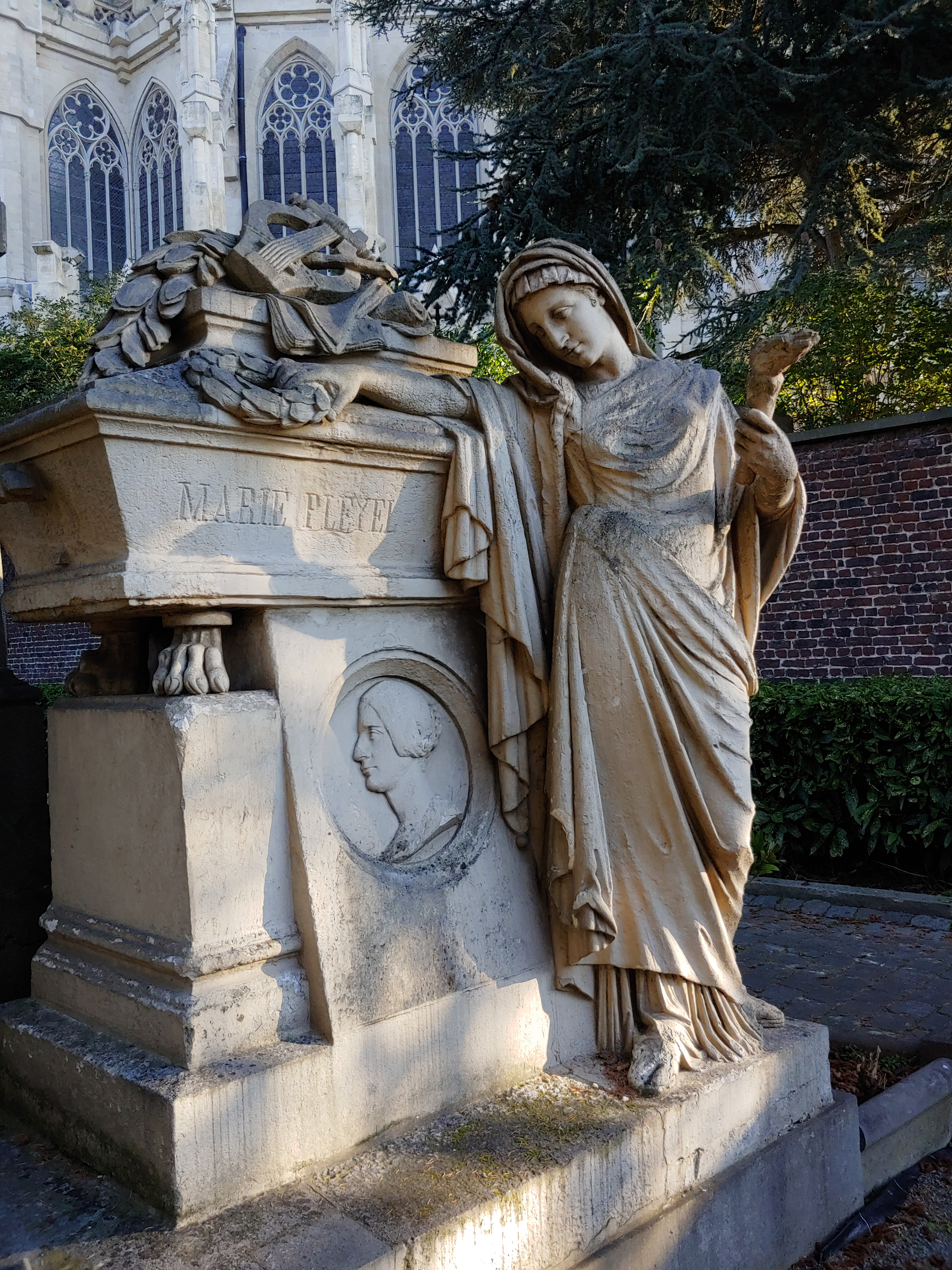
Pleyel's grave in 2021.

Marie-Félicité-Denise Pleyel (née Moke; 4 July or 4 September 1811 – 30 March 1875) was a Belgian concert pianist.

== Early life ==
With a father from Torhout in Flemish-speaking Belgium who was a language teacher, and a German mother who ran a lingerie shop in the 9th arrondissement, Pleyel was born in Paris and was trilingual. She studied the piano with Henri Herz, Moscheles, and Kalkbrenner. She gave her first formal recital at the age of eight, amazing the public with her young virtuosity.

The famous critic François Joseph Fétis wrote that he had heard all the famous pianists, but that none conveyed to him a sentiment of perfection like Madame Pleyel ("...mais je déclare qu'aucun d'eux ne m'a donné, comme Madame Pleyel, le sentiment de perfection.").

== Marriage and later career ==
Berlioz was desperately in love with Pleyel, and in 1830 they became engaged. While he was in Italy, she broke off the engagement to marry Camille Pleyel, son of Ignaz Pleyel, and heir to the piano manufacturing business.

Pleyel was one of the most admired pianists of the 1830s. In 1848, she became chair of the piano department of the Brussels Conservatoire.

She died in Sint-Joost-ten-Node, near Brussels.
