= Hugh Macdonald (musicologist) =

English musicologist (born 1940)

Hugh John Macdonald (born 31 January 1940 in Newbury, Berkshire) is an English musicologist chiefly known for his work within the music of the 19th century, especially in France. He has been general editor of the Hector Berlioz: New Edition of the Complete Works since its inception in 1967 and has been particularly active in the revival of interest in Berlioz's music. He is also the author of several entries within The Grove Dictionary of Music and Musicians.

== Biography ==
Macdonald studied under Raymond Leppard at the University of Cambridge from 1958 to 1966. He went on to pursue doctoral studies, earning a Ph.D. in 1969 from Cambridge, after researching the music of Berlioz for a dissertation consisting of a critical edition of Les Troyens. He served on the faculty of music at Cambridge from 1966 to 1971 and on the music faculty at University of Oxford from 1971 to 1980. While there Macdonald conducted the Oxford University Opera Club's 1974 production of Idomeneo. He became the Gardiner Professor of Music at Glasgow University in 1980, where he remained until 1987, when he was appointed Avis Blewett Professor of Music at Washington University in St. Louis.

== Works ==
- 2019: MacDonald, Hugh (2019). Saint-Saëns and the Stage. doi:10.1017/9781108550925. ISBN 978-1-108-55092-5. S2CID 194175658.
- 2014: Macdonald, Hugh (2014). Bizet. Oxford University Press. ISBN 978-0-19-938473-0.
- 1967-: "Hector Berlioz (1803–1869): New Edition of the Complete Works". Bärenreiter Verlag.

== Articles ==
- MacDonald, Hugh (1 April 1993). "Berlioz's 'Messe solennelle'". 19th-Century Music. 16 (3): 267–285. doi:10.2307/746395. JSTOR 746395.
- MacDonald, Hugh (1989). "The Prose Libretto". Cambridge Opera Journal. 1 (2): 155–166. doi:10.1017/S0954586700002949. JSTOR 823589. S2CID 191627916.
- MacDonald, Hugh (1984). "To Repeat or Not to Repeat?". Proceedings of the Royal Musical Association. 111: 121–138. doi:10.1093/jrma/111.1.121. hdl:10017/36447. JSTOR 766166.
- MacDonald, Hugh (November 1978). "Schubert's Volcanic Temper". The Musical Times. 119 (1629): 949–952. doi:10.2307/960118. JSTOR 960118.

== Sources ==
- "Hugh Mcdonald" (archived copy), from Washington University in St. Louis.
