= Camille Pleyel =

French musician

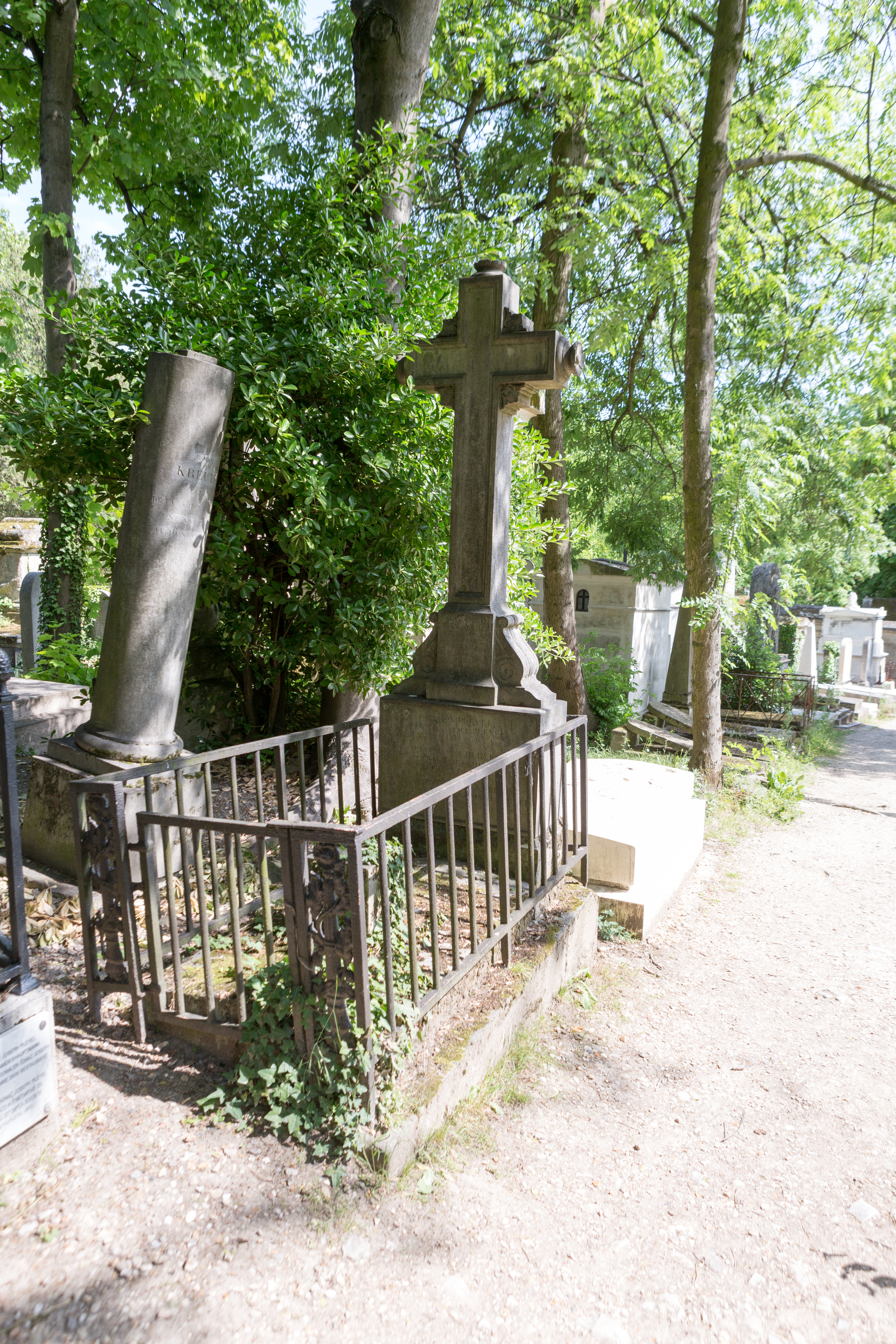
Pleyel's tomb in Paris.

Joseph Étienne Camille Pleyel (December 18, 1788 – May 4, 1855) was a French virtuoso pianist, publisher, and owner of Pleyel et Cie. He also ran a concert hall, the Salle Pleyel, where Frédéric Chopin played the first and last of his concerts in Paris.

The youngest son of Ignace Joseph Pleyel, he studied with Jan Dussek. He became a partner of his father in 1815 and owner of the firm after his death in 1831. His salons hosted the greatest talents of his day in France. Pleyel provided pianos to Frédéric Chopin.

Pleyel's wife, Marie-Félicité-Denise née Moke (1811–1875), was also an accomplished pianist who studied under Friedrich Kalkbrenner. Before their marriage, Marie's mother called off her engagement with Hector Berlioz, inspiring Berlioz to elaborately plan to kill Marie, her mother, and Camille using two stolen double-barreled pistols, though he did not carry through with his plan. Chopin's Nocturnes Op. 9 (1833) are dedicated to "Madame Camille Pleyel". Camille and Marie separated after four years of marriage on account of her "multiple infidelities", and she went on to become a professor of piano at the conservatory in Brussels in 1848.

Pleyel died in 1855 and was buried in the Père Lachaise Cemetery in Paris. Rue Pleyel in the 12th arrondissement is named in his honour.
