= Melinda O'Neal =

American choral conductor

Melinda O'Neal is a conductor of choral and choral-orchestral music, professor emerita of music, and author.

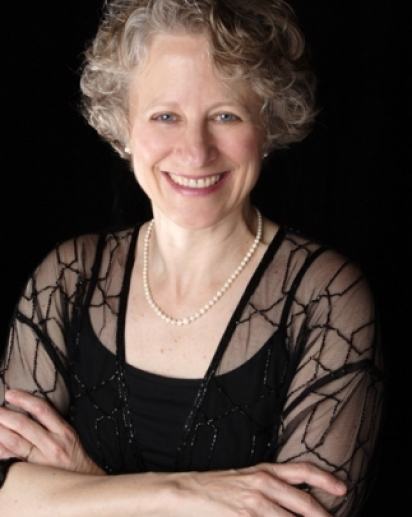
Melinda O'Neal Headshot

O'Neal was music director and conductor of the Handel Society of Dartmouth College (oratorio society of 100 student and community voices) 1979–2004, and founder and conductor of Dartmouth College Chamber Singers (30-voices) 1979-1996. She was a professor of music at Dartmouth College 1979–2018, leading ensembles and teaching courses in conducting, vocal literature, Berlioz and Brahms, and music theory.

In 2016 and 2017, O'Neal taught choral literature courses for conducting graduate students at Indiana University. She was visiting professor at Towson University (MD) 2005, Indiana University 1999, and University of Georgia 1996-97.

As an independent conductor, O'Neal was artistic director and conductor of Handel Choir of Baltimore 2004-2013, inaugurating both the Handel Period Instrument Orchestra and Chandos Singers. She co-founded and led the Boston Vocal Artists' Sonique from 2003-2005, served as principal guest conductor of the Hanover Chamber Orchestra 1991-2004, and was guest conductor-in-residence in 1995 of the Seattle Symphony Orchestra Chorale to prepare Berlioz's La Damnation de Faust. As chorus master for Monadnock Music Festival in Wilton, NH 1994-96, she prepared performances of Gluck’s Orphée et Eurydice with period instruments, and Virgil Thompson’s The Mother of Us All, conducted by James Bolle. O'Neal was the founder and chorus master of the New Hampshire Symphony Orchestra Chorus, preparing performances of Berlioz’s Grande messe des morts, Busoni’s Piano Concerto Op. 39, Verdi’s Requiem, and Beethoven’s Ninth Symphony, conducted by James Bolle in Manchester, NH, 1984-1987.

In 2018, O'Neal wrote Experiencing Berlioz: A Listener’s Companion (Lanham, MD: Rowman & Littlefield), an in-depth entrée into the music world of Hector Berlioz that is crafted for both listeners and performers alike. An online addendum offers texts and translations to vocal music discussed: https://www.melindaoneal.net/texts-translations/. Recently, she presented the lecture “Mélodies Fantastiques! — Mystique and Narrative in Berlioz’s Vocal Music” for Opera Prelude, Cadogan Hall, London, United Kingdom. November 26, 2019.

== Conductor-Ensemble highlights ==
Handel Choir of Baltimore (2004-2013): Establishment of the Handel Period Instrument Orchestra for all pre-romantic concerts; series of Haydn Mass concerts; annual Messiah performances; performance of Handel Semele and Coronation Anthems, Bach cantatas, Mozart Requiem, Duruflé Requiem, Vaughan Williams G minor Mass; collaborations with American Opera Theatre in staged productions of Handel Jephtha and Purcell Dido and Aeneas; collaboration with Peabody Institute and Pro Musica Rara in Handel Ode for the Birthday of Queen Anne; selected to perform at ACDA Eastern conference; collaborations with Baltimore Chamber Orchestra; commissions and performances of works by Leshnoff and McCulllough; collaboration with University of MD Baltimore County for Brahms Ein deutsches Requiem; workshops for BSO OrchKids; concerts to support local humanitarian nonprofits.

Handel Society of Dartmouth College (1979-2004): Two ten-day concert tours to Germany and Austria; performances of Berlioz symphony Roméo et Juliette and L'enfance du Christ, Bach St. Matthew Passion, John Adams Harmonium, Respighi Lauda per la Natività del Signore, Brahms Ein deutsches Requiem, Verdi Requiem; Vaughan Williams Hodie and Dona Nobis Pacem, Stravkinsky Symphony of Psalms; collaborations with New Hampshire Symphony in Manchester and Hanover for Mahler Symphony No. 2 and Poulenc Gloria; commissioning and première of The Staff of Aesculapius by Charles Dodge for Dartmouth Medical School Bicentennial; performances of lesser-known Berlioz cantatas, choruses and songs; performance of closing scene of Berlioz L’enfance du Christ with New York Pops Orchestra in Carnegie Hall; Concertato Singers’ première of Vox by Dennis Desormier ’97 and performances in summer Dartmouth Conducting Institutes; concerts in rural NH and VT communities.

Dartmouth College Chamber Singers (1979-1996): Annual Feast of Song renaissance theatrical-musical banquet with the Early Music Ensemble; series of period instrument concerts with Arcadia Players of music by Mozart, Haydn, Bach, Purcell; performances of Brahms Neu und Alte Liebesliederwaltzers, Britten Hymn to St. Cecilia, lesser-known Berlioz choruses and songs, Ravel Trois Chansons, Messiaen O Sacrum Convivium, Ives Psalm 90; performance at ACDA Eastern conference in Boston; seven international concert tours (England, Scandinavia, Germany-Austria, Spain) and multiple national or regional tours in alternate years; numerous on-campus and local performances.

== Education ==
O'Neal received her doctoral and master's degrees in conducting from Indiana University Jacobs School of Music and bachelor's degree in music education from Florida State University College of Music. Her mentors include Julius Herford, Jan Harrington, Fiora Contino, Helmuth Rilling, Marcel Couraud, John Nelson, Thomas Dunn, and Joseph Flummerfelt. From Bethesda, MD, she currently lives south-west of Washington DC in Virginia.
