= Ian Bent =

British musicologist

Ian David Bent (born 1 January 1938) is a British-born music scholar. He is now professor emeritus, after retiring from Full Professor of Music, at Columbia University and Honorary Professor in the History of Music Theory at the University of Cambridge.

He took the BA (1961), MusB (1962), and PhD (1969) all from the University of Cambridge before serving as a lecturer at King's College, London in 1965, a professor at the University of Nottingham in 1975, and Columbia University in 1986. His earliest research dealt with the early history of the English Chapel Royal, but later he turned to the history of theory and analysis, and is now a historian of music theory.

He is the editor (since 1991) of the Cambridge Studies in Music Theory and Analysis series and an area editor for the second edition of The New Grove Dictionary of Music. As of 2011, he is the director of Schenker Documents Online.

== Published works ==
- Analysis (Macmillan, 1987; translated into Italian and French). ISBN 978-0-393-02447-0
- Music Analysis in the Nineteenth Century, 2 vols (CUP, 1994 & 2004). ISBN 978-0-521-25969-9 and ISBN 978-0-521-67347-1
- (edited) Music Theory in the Age of Romanticism (CUP, 1996). ISBN 978-0-521-55102-1
