= Kerry Murphy (musicologist) =

Australian musicologist

Kerry Murphy FAHA is an Australian musicologist noted for her scholarship of colonial music history and French music. Murphy is Professor of Music and Head of Musicology at the University of Melbourne, Australia.

== Biography ==
Kerry Murphy did her undergraduate and postgraduate degrees at the University of Melbourne. The research for her PhD (1984) The Formation of the Music Criticism of Hector Berlioz (Melbourne University Postgraduate scholarship) was supervised by M. François Lesure (École des hautes études, Paris) and Meredith Moon at Melbourne. While studying in Paris (1980–1982) she participated in musicology seminars run by Lesure at the École des hautes études. Before taking up her lecturing job at the Faculty of Music, she worked as an assistant archivist at the Grainger Museum and lecturer at Australian Catholic University and Canberra School of Music. In 1990 she was awarded a Melbourne University Research Fellowship for Women with Career Interruptions, which she half-shared with a lectureship at Melbourne.

Murphy has attracted substantial external peer reviewed grants and has convened a number of conferences, including "Music's Audience" (2001, keynote Stephen Banfield, Birmingham), the 2001 National conference of the Musicological Society of Australia and an international Symposium on 19th Century French music in 2004.

She is a founding member of the United Kingdom Arts and Humanities Research Council Network Francophone Music Criticism 1789–1914, and since 2006 has been an Honorary Associate (and Australian corresponding member) of Centre for the History of Music in Britain, the Empire and the Commonwealth, (CHOMBEC) in the UK. She was a member of the artistic advisory board of the Victorian Opera Company.

Murphy's research interests focus chiefly on 19th-century French music and music criticism, and colonial Australian music history. She has a particular interest in opera and in reception studies. In both her areas of research, Murphy has built up and fostered postgraduate study, running special reading groups and also employing her postgraduates as research assistants. Of her fourteen successful doctorate supervisions, four have books out or about to appear with major publishers. Her postgraduates consistently achieve outstanding results.

Murphy has been productive in attracting international scholars to the Music Faculty (through a number of grant schemes); this has enriched the scholarly and research climate for staff and postgraduate students. She was elected a Fellow of the Australian Academy of the Humanities in 2008.
