= List of works by Hector Berlioz =

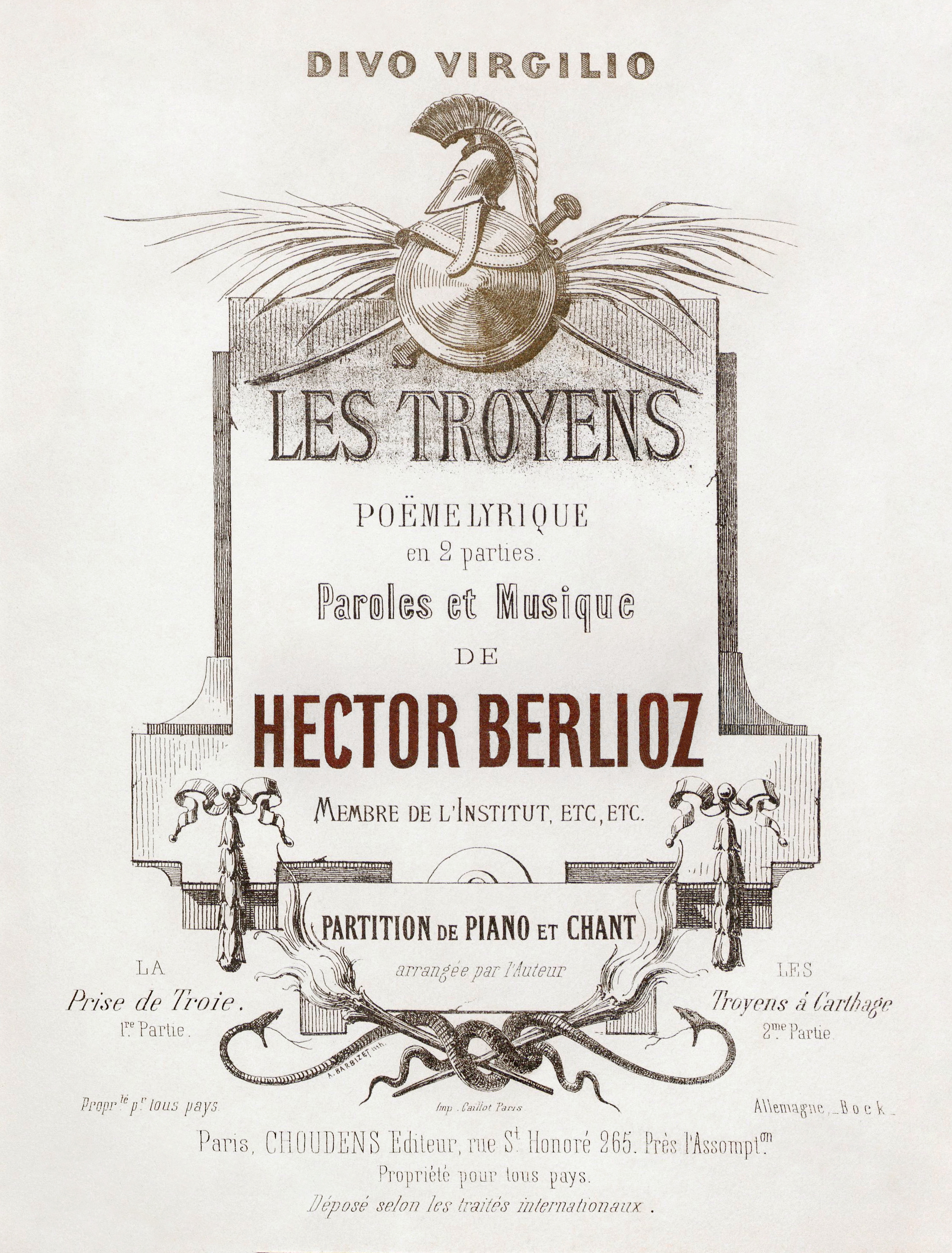
Cover to an early, possibly first edition, vocal score of Les Troyens

The French romantic composer Hector Berlioz produced significant musical and literary works. Berlioz composed mainly in the genres of opera, symphonies, choral pieces and songs. As well as these, Berlioz also produced several works that fit into hybrid genres, such as the "dramatic symphony" Roméo et Juliette and Harold in Italy, a symphony with a large solo part for viola. Berlioz's compositions are listed both by genre and by the catalogue developed by the musicologist D. Kern Holoman. Opus numbers were assigned to compositions when they published. However, they were only given to a fraction of Berlioz's work and are not in chronological order. Berlioz's writings include memoirs, technical studies and music criticism.

== Musical compositions by genre ==
Many of Berlioz's works resist easy categorisation and assigning them to a genre is often impossible. The genres given below should be regarded as merely a guideline.

=== Orchestral works ===
==== Symphonies ====
- Symphonie fantastique (1830)
- Harold en Italie (1834)
- Roméo et Juliette (1839)
- Grande symphonie funèbre et triomphale (1840)

==== Overtures ====
- Waverley (1828)
- Le roi Lear (1831)
- Rob Roy (1831)
- Le Carnaval romain (1844)
- Le Corsaire (1844)
- Marche Troyenne (1864)

==== Concertante work ====
- Rêverie et caprice (Romance for violin and orchestra) (1841)

=== Choral and orchestral works ===
==== Operas ====
- Estelle et Némorin (1823; lost)
- Les francs-juges (1826–33; unperformed – survives in fragments)
- Benvenuto Cellini (1834–38)
- La Nonne sanglante (1841–47; unfinished)
- Les Troyens (1856–58; final three acts performed 1863)
- Béatrice et Bénédict (1860–62)

==== Oratorios ====
- La damnation de Faust (1845–46)
- L'enfance du Christ (1850–54)

==== Sacred works ====
- Messe solenelle (1824)
- Resurrexit (1828)
- Chant sacré (1829)
- Quartetto e coro dei maggi (1832)
- Le Cinq mai, chant sur la mort de l’empereur Napoléon (1835)
- Grande messe des morts (Requiem) (1837)
- Prière du matin (1846)
- Te Deum (1849)
- Meditation religieuse (1849)
- Hymne pour la consécration du nouveau tabernacle (1859)
- Veni creator (?1861–68)
- Tantum ergo (?1861–68)

==== Secular works ====
- La révolution grecque: scéne héroïque (1825)
- Le ballet des ombres (1829; withdrawn)
- Huit scènes de Faust (1828–29)
- Chant guerrier (1829)
- Chanson à boire (1829)
- Lélio, ou le retour à la vie (1831)
- Sara la baigneuse (1834)
- Les chant des Bretons (1835)
- Aubade (1839)
- Tristia (1831–44)
- Hymne à la France (1844)
- Le Chant des chemins de fer (1846)
- La menace des Francs (1848)
- L’impériale (1854)

==== Prix de Rome cantatas ====
- La mort d’Orphée (1827)
- Herminie (1828)
- Cléopâtre (1829)
- Sardanapale (1830; mostly lost)

==== Songs ====
- La dépit de la bergère (?1818–22)
- Le maure jaloux (?1818–22)
- Amitié reprends ton empire (?1818–22)
- Pleure, pauvre Colette (?1818–22)
- Canon libre à quinte (?1818–22)
- Le montagnard exilé (?1822–23)
- Toi qui l'aimas, verse des pleurs (?1822–23)

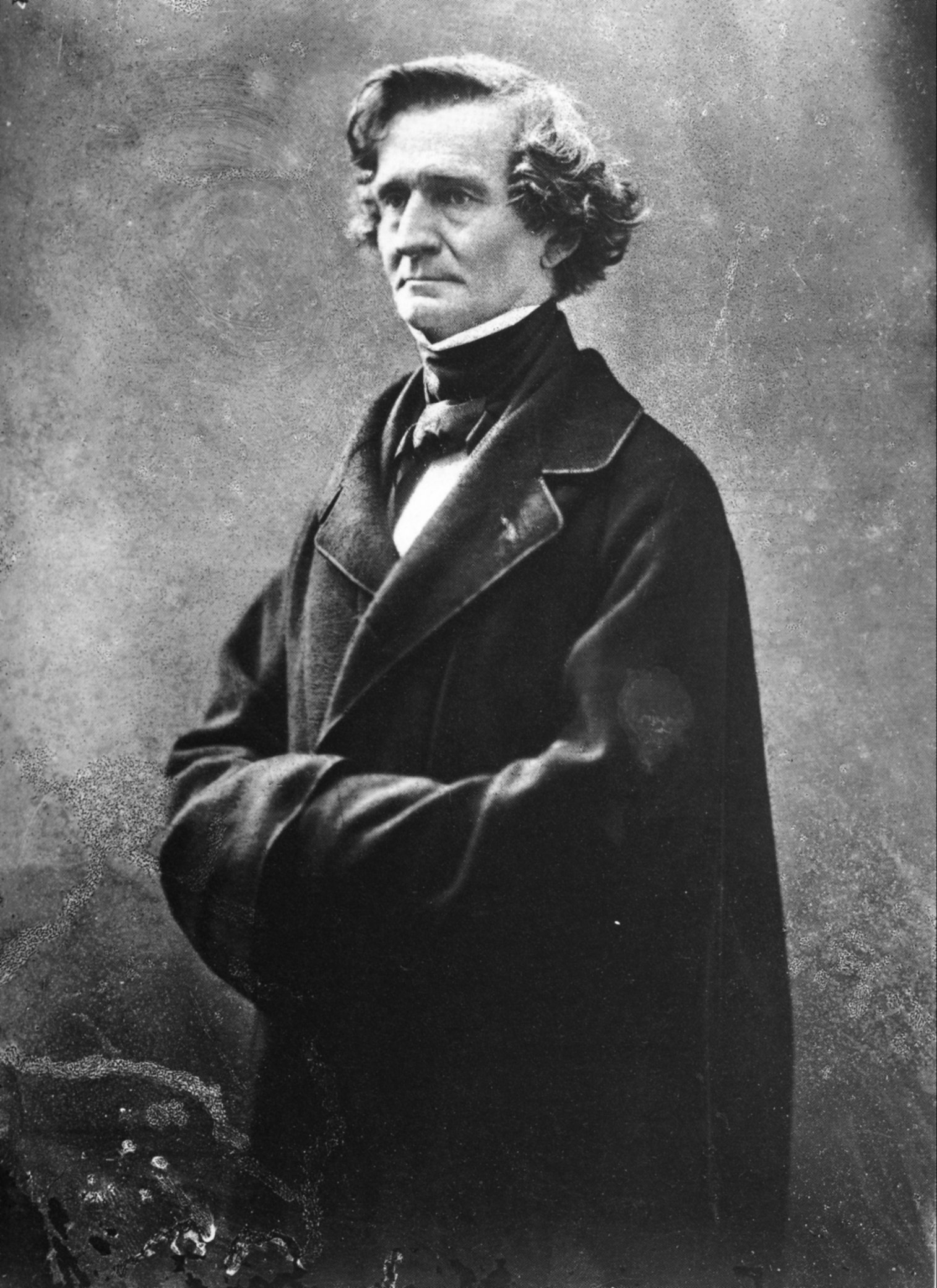
Photograph of Berlioz by Félix Nadar, January 1857

- Nocturne (?1828)
- Le pêcheur (?1828)
- Le roi de Thulé (1828)
- Irlande (1829)
- La captive (1832)
- Je crois en vous (1834)
- Chansonette (1835)
- Les nuits d'été (1841)
- La mort d'Ophélie (1842)
- Fleurs des landes (1850)
- Feuillets d'album (1850)

=== Chamber music ===
- Albumleaf for piano (1844)
- Hymne pour l’élévation in D major for organ (1844)
- Sérénade agreste à la Madone sur le thème des pifferari romains in E flat major for organ (1844)
- Toccata in C major for organ (1844)

=== Arrangements ===
- J. J. B. Pollet: Fleure du Tage (?1817)
- Claude Joseph Rouget de Lisle: La Marseillaise (1830)
- Claude Joseph Rouget de Lisle: Chant du neuf Thermidor (1830)
- Ferdinand Huber: Sur les alpes quel délice (1833)
- Carl Maria von Weber : Recitatives for Der Freischütz (1841)
- Carl Maria von Weber: L’invitation à la valse (1841)
- Leopold de Meyer: Marche marocaine (1845)
- Traditional: Marche de Rákóczi (1846)
- Christoph Willibald Gluck: Orphée (1859)
- J. P. E. Martini: Plaisir d’amour (1859)
- Franz Schubert: Erlkönig (1860)
- Christoph Willibald Gluck: Alceste (1861)
- François Couperin: Invitation à louer Dieu (?1861–68)

== Works by Holoman number ==
This is a list of works by Holoman number, from the Catalogue of the works of Hector Berlioz (1987) by D. Kern Holoman, the 25th volume Bärenreiter's New Berlioz edition (1967–2006) [NBE]. The volume number that the work appears in the NBE is given. Many works exist in multiple versions for different forces. Opus numbers are also given for those works that have them. (The bracketed opus numbers 27 and 29 were suggested by Richard Pohl.)

=== Extant works ===
H	Op.	Title, genre	Composed	Premiere	Notes	NBE
5		Fleure du Tage	?1817		Guitar accompaniment to music by Pollet	22b
7		Le dépit de la bergère, romance	?1818–22			15
8		Guitar accompaniment for romances	?1818–21		for various composers	22b
9		Le maure jaloux, romance	?1818–22		two versions, also entitled L’arabe jaloux	15
10		Amitié, reprends ton empire, romance et invocation	?1818–22		two versions	15
11		Pleure, pauvre Colette, romance	?1818–22			15
14		Canon libre à la quinte	?1818–22			15
15		Le montagnard exilé, chant élégiaque	?1822–23			15
16		Toi qui l’aimas, verse des pleurs, romance	?1822–23			15
20A		Messe solennelle	1824	10 July 1825	withdrawn 1827; rediscovered 1992	23
20B		Resurrexit	1824	26 May 1828	arranged from Messe solennelle; largely absorbed into Benvenuto Cellini, Grande messe des morts and Te Deum	12a
21		La révolution grecque: scéne héroïque, scène héroïque	1825–26	26 May 1828	21A for chorus and orchestra, 21B for chorus and military band	12a
22		Fugue	1826		Prix de Rome submission	6
23	3	Fragments of Les francs-juges, drame lyrique	1825–26	overture and movements 7 and 11 on 26 May	Five complete movements extant	4
25		La mort d’Orphée, monologue et bacchanale	1827	Performance planned for 26 May 1828 but cancelled	Prix de Rome cantata	6
26	1	Waverley, grande ouverture	1827–28	26 May 1828		20
29		Herminie, scène lyrique	1828		Prix de Rome cantata	6
31		Nocturne	?1825–30			22b
33	1	Huit scènes de Faust: 1. Chants de la fête de Pâques; 2. Paysans sous les tilleuls 3. Concert de sylphes 4. Écot de joyeux compagnons 5. Chanson de Méphistophélès; 6. Le roi de Thulé; 7. Romance de Marguerite; 8. Sérénade de Méphistophélès	1828–29	1 November 1829	withdrawn by Berlioz; later used in La damnation de Faust	5
33b	1/6	Le roi de Thulé, chanson gothique	1828		for soprano and piano	15
35		Fugue à trois sujets	1829		Prix de Rome submission	6
36		Cléopâtre, scène lyrique	1829	1 August 1829	Prix de Rome cantata	6
37	2	Le ballet des ombres, ronde nocturne	1828		withdrawn by Berlioz	14
38	2	Irlande	1829		H39–47	
39	2/1	Le coucher du soleil, rêverie	1829	18 February 1830		15
40	2/2	Hélène (Berlioz), ballade	1829			15
41	2/3	Chant guerrier	1829	5 December 1830		14
42A	2/4	La Belle Voyageuse, ballade	1829			15
43	2/5	Chanson à boire	1829			14
44	2/6	Chant sacré	1829	18 February 1830		14
45	2/7	L’origine de la harpe, ballade	1829			15
46	2/8	Adieu Bessy, romance anglaise et française	1829			15
47	2/9	Elégie en prose	1829			15
48	14	Symphonie fantastique, épisode de la vie d’un artiste	1830	5 December 1830		16
51		Hymne des Marseillais	1830		Two versions	22b
51bis		Chant du neuf Thermidor	1830		arrangement of music by Rouget de Lisle	22b
52		Ouverture pour la Tempête de Shakespeare	1830	7 November 1830	later incorporated into Lélio	7
53	4	Le Roi Lear, grande ouverture	1831	22 December 1833		20
54		Intrata di Rob-Roy Macgregor	1831	14 April 1833	withdrawn	20
55	14bis	Lélio, ou Le retour à la vie, monodrame lyrique	1831–32	9 December 1832	sequel to Symphonie fantastique	7
56b	18/1	Méditation religieuse	1831		part of Tristia H119; original version lost	12b
59		Quartetto e coro dei maggi	1832		possibly rev. of lost Marche religieuse des mages, 1828	12a
60	12	La Captive, orientale	1832	30 December 1832		15
64		Sur les alpes quel délice (le chasseur de chamois)	1833	6 June 1833	Arrangement of music by Ferdinand Huber	22b
65	13/4	Le Jeune Pâtre breton	1833	22 December 1833	also part of Fleurs des landes	15
67	19/2	Les champs, romance	1834		rev. in Feuillets d’album (1850)	15
68	16	Harold en Italie	1834	23 November 1834		17
69	11	Sara la baigneuse, ballade	1834	9 November 1834	rev. 1850 from lost original	12a
70		Je crois en vous, romance	1834		used in Benvenuto Cellini	15
71	13/5	Le chant des bretons	1834		rev. as Fleurs des landes, no.5	15
73		Chansonette	1835		used for the Choeur de masques in Benvenuto Cellini	15
74	6	Le Cinq mai, chant sur la mort de l’empereur Napoléon	1835	22 November 1835	refrain composed 1832	12a
75	5	Grande messe des morts (Requiem)	1837	5 December 1837		9
76	23	Benvenuto Cellini, opera semiseria	1836–38	10 September 1838	Libretto: L. de Wailly, A. Barbier and A. de Vigny	1
78		Aubade	1839			13
79	17	Roméo et Juliette, symphonie dramatique	1839	24 November 1839		18
80	15	Grande symphonie funèbre et triomphale	1840	26 July 1840		19
81	7	Les nuits d'été	1840–41		originally for voice and piano, later orchestrated	15
82		Villanelle			part of Les nuits d’été	
83		Le spectre de la rose			part of Les nuits d’été	
84		Sur les lagunes, lamento			part of Les nuits d’été	
85		Absence			part of Les nuits d’été	
86		Au cimetière, clair de lune			part of Les nuits d’été	
87		L’ile inconnue			part of Les nuits d’été	
88	8	Rêverie et caprice, romance	1841	1 February 1842	from air composed for Benvenuto Cellini	21
89		Le Freyschütz	1841	7 June 1841	opera by Weber with dialogue composed to recitative	22b
90		L’invitation à la valse	1841	1 February 1842	orchestration of original by Weber	22b
92	18/2	La mort d’Ophélie	1842		part of Tristia H119	15
94	19/5	La belle Isabeau, conte pendant l’orage	1843		also part of Feuillets d’album H121	15
95	9	Le carnaval romain, ouverture caractéristique	1844	3 February 1844	on material from Benvenuto Cellini	20
97	20/2	Hymne à la France	1844	1 August 1844	part of Vox Populi H120	12b
98		Sérénade agreste à la Madone sur le thème des pifferari romains	1844		part of Trois pièces pour orgue mélodium	21
99		Toccata	1844		part of Trois morceaux for orgue-mélodium	21
100		Hymne pour l’élévation	1844		part of Trois morceaux for orgue-mélodium	21
101	21	Le corsaire, ouverture	1844	19 January 1845		20
103	18/3	Marche funèbre pour la dernière scène d’Hamlet	1844		part of Tristia H119	12
104A	19/6	Le chasseur danois	1845	April 1846	also part of Feuillets d’album H121	15
105		Marche marocaine	1845	6 April 1845	arrangement of music by Léopold de Meyer	22b
107	19/1	Zaïde, boléro	1845	29 November 1845	also part of Feuillets d’album H121	15
109		Marche de Rákóczi	1846	15 February 1846	arrangement of traditional; used in La damnation de Faust	22b
110	19/3	Le Chant des chemins de fer, cantata	1846	14 June 1846	also part of Feuillets d’album H121	12b It
111	24	La damnation de Faust, légende dramatique	1845–46	6 December 1846	incorporating rev. versions of Huit scènes de Faust	8
112	19/4	Prière du matin	1846		also part of Feuillets d’album H121	14
113	13/3	Le trébuchet	1846		also part of Fleurs des landes	15
117	20/1	La menace des Francs, marche et choeur	1848	25 March 1851	part of Vox Populi H120	12b
118	22	Te Deum	1849	30 April 1855		10
119	18	Tristia: 1. Méditation religieuse 2. La Mort d’Ophélie; 3. Marche funèbre pour la dernière scène d’Hamlet	1831–44		collection of 3 previous works	12b
120	20	Vox Populi: 1. La Menace des Francs; 2. Hymne à la France	1849		collection of 2 previous works	12b
121	19	Feuillets d’album: 1. Zaïde; 2. Les champs 3. Le Chant des chemins de fer 4. Prière du matin 5. La belle Isabeau; 6. Le chasseur danois	1850		collection of 6 previous works	
124	13	Fleurs des landes: 1. Le Matin; 2. Petit Oiseau; 3. Le Trébuchet; 4. Le Jeune Pâtre breton 5. Le Chant des Bretons	1850		collection of five mélodies	15
129	26	L'impériale, cantata	1854	15 November 1855		12b
130	25	L'enfance du Christ, trilogie sacrée	1850–54	10 December 1854		11
133	(29)	Les Troyens, grand opera	1856–58	4 November 1863	libretto by Berlioz after Virgil's Aeneid	2
133B		Marche Troyenne	1864		arr. from Act 1 of Les Troyens	21
134		Plaisir d'amour	1859	23 April 1859	arrangement of music by JPE Martini	22b
135		Hymne pour la consécration du nouveau tabernacle	1859			14
136		Erlkönig	1860	27 August 1860	orchestration of lieder by Schubert	22b
137	28	Le Temple universel	1861			14
138	(27)	Béatrice et Bénédict, opéra comique	1860–62	9 August 1862	libretto by Berlioz after Shakespeare's Much Ado about Nothing	3
141		Veni creator, motet	?1861–68			14
142		Tantum ergo, motet	?1861–68			14
143		Invitation à louer Dieu	?1861–68		arrangement of music by François Couperin	22b

=== Lost works ===
H	Title, genre	Composed	Notes
1	Potpourri concertant sur des thèmes italiens	c.1818	
2-3	2 quintets	c.1818	
6	Estelle et Némorin, songs	1823	
12	Le cheval arabe, cantata	1822–23	
13	Canon à trois voix	1822–23	
17	Estelle et Némorin, opera	1823	
18	Le passage de la mer rouge, oratorio in Latin	1823	
19	Beverley ou Le joueur, dramatic scene	1824	
24	Fugue	1827	Prix de Rome submission
27	Marche religieuse des mages	1828	
30	Variations for guitar on Mozart's Là ci darem la mano	1828	
32	O salutaris	1828–29	
34	Chanson de pirates	1829	
49	Fugue	1830	Prix de Rome submission
50	Sardanapale	1830	Prix de Rome cantata
57	Choeur de toutes les voix	1831	
58	Choeur d’anges pour les fêtes de Noël	1831	
61	Le Dernier Jour du monde, oratorio	1831	
63	La Chasse de Lützow	1831	arrangement of music by Weber
66	Romance de Marie Tudor	1833	
72	Fête musicale funèbre à la mémoire des hommes illustres de la France	1835	
102	Scène de la comédie	1844	One of three movements intended as incidental music for a production of Hamlet
108	Marche d’Isly	1845	arrangement of music by Léopold de Meyer
115	Chant du départ	1848	arrangement of music by Étienne Méhul
116	Mourons pour la patrie	1848	arrangement of music by Rouget de Lisle

=== Unfinished works ===
- H23C Le Cri de guerre du Brisgaw intermezzo in one act based on Les francs-juges (1833–34)
- H61 Le Dernier Jour du monde oratorio (1831–33)
- H72 Fête musicale funèbre à la mémoire des hommes illustres de la France (1835)
- H77 Érigone intermède antique (1835–39)
- H91 La Nonne sanglante opera (1841–47)

There were also several works that Berlioz planned to write mentioned in his memoirs and letters that he never wrote. These include the operas Les Noces d’or d’Obéron et de Titania, La Mort d’Hercule, Richard en Palestine, Robin-Hood, Atala, Les Noces des fées, Les Brigands, Hamlet, Méphistophélès, Roméo et Juliette, Cléopâtre, Salammbô, and an opera on the Thirty Years' War; settings of verses by Édouard Turquety and Abbé Arnaud, Canon of Poitiers; a Symphony in A minor; and a vast symphonic poem.

== Writings ==
=== Literary works ===
- Grand traité d'instrumentation et d'orchestration moderne, Op. 10, Treatise on Instrumentation (Paris, 1843; revised ed. 1855)
- Voyage musical en Allemagne et en Italie, Musical journey in Germany and Italy (Paris, 1844)
- Les soirées de l'orchestre, Evenings with the Orchestra (Paris, 1852); ed. L. Guichard (Paris, 1968)
- Le chef d’orchestre: théorie de son art, The conductor: theory of his art (Paris, 1856)
- Les grotesques de la musique, The grotesques of music (Paris 1859)
- À travers champs, Cross-country (Paris, 1862); ed. L. Guichard (Paris, 1971)
- Mémoires, Memoirs (Paris, 1870); ed. P. Citron (Paris, 1969, 2/1991)
- Les musiciens et la musique, Musicians and music, ed. A. Hallays (Paris, 1903)
- ed. G. Condé: Cauchemars et passions, Nightmares and passions (Paris, 1981)

=== Criticism ===
Throughout his career Berlioz produced a large amount of music criticism, starting in 1823, writing articles in Le corsaire (1823–25), Le correspondant (1829–30), Berliner allgemeine musikalische Zeitung (1829), Revue européenne (1832), Europe littéraire (1833), Le rénovateur (1833–35),Gazette (later Revue et gazette) musicale (1834–61),Journal des débats (1834–63), Journal des artistes (1834), Monde dramatique (1835), Italie pittoresque (Paris, 1836), Chronique de Paris (1837–38),L’éclair (Brussels, 1842), L’émancipation (1843), L’artiste (1844), Monde illustré (1858–59)

Berlioz's complete music criticism is being collected and edited by l’Association Nationale Hector Berlioz as Hector Berlioz: Critique Musicale 1823–1863. The complete edition will comprise ten volumes:

- Volume 1: 1823–1834, ed. by H. Robert Cohen and Yves Gérard (1996)
- Volume 2: 1835–1836, ed. by Marie-Hélène Coudroy-Saghaï and Anne Bongrain (1998)
- Volume 3: 1837–1838, ed. by Anne Bongrain and Marie-Hélène Coudroy-Saghaï (2001)
- Volume 4: 1839–1841, ed. by Anne Bongrain and Marie-Hélène Coudroy-Saghaï (2003)
- Volume 5: 1842–1844, ed. by Anne Bongrain and Marie-Hélène Coudroy-Saghaï (2004)
- Volume 6: 1845–1848, ed. by Anne Bongrain and Marie-Hélène Coudroy-Saghaï (2008)
- Volume 7: 1849–1851, ed. by Anne Bongrain and Marie-Hélène Coudroy-Saghaï (2014)
- Volume 8: 1852–1855, ed. by Anne Bongrain and Marie-Hélène Coudroy-Saghaï (2016)
- Volume 9: 1856–1859, ed. by Anne Bongrain and Marie-Hélène Coudroy-Saghaï (2018)
- Volume 10: 1860–1863, ed. by Anne Bongrain and Marie-Hélène Coudroy-Saghaï (2020)

=== Correspondence ===
Nearly four thousand of Berlioz's letters have been preserved

- Hector Berlioz, Correspondance Générale I: 1803 – May 1832 [nos. 1–273], ed. by Pierre Citron (1972)
- Hector Berlioz, Correspondance Générale II: June 1832 – September 1842 [nos. 274–775], ed. by Frédéric Robert (1975)
- Hector Berlioz, Correspondance Générale III: September 1842 – 1850 [nos. 776–1367], ed. by Pierre Citron (1978)
- Hector Berlioz, Correspondance Générale IV: 1851 – February 1855 [nos. 1368–1904], ed. by Pierre Citron, Yves Gérard and Hugh J. Macdonald (1983)
- Hector Berlioz, Correspondance Générale V: March 1855 – August 1859 [nos. 1905–2395], ed. by Hugh J. Macdonald and François Lesure (1989)
- Hector Berlioz, Correspondance Générale VI: September 1859 – 1863 [nos. 2396–2816], ed. by Hugh J. Macdonald and François Lesure (1995)
- Hector Berlioz, Correspondance Générale VII: 1864–1869 [nos. 2817–3380], ed. by Hugh J. Macdonald (2001)
- Hector Berlioz: Correspondance Générale VIII: Suppléments, ed. by Hugh J. Macdonald (2003)
- Nouvelles lettres de Berlioz, de sa famille, de ses contemporains, ed. Peter Bloom, Joël-Marie Fauquet, Hugh J. Macdonald and Cécile Reynaud, Actes Sud/Palazzetto Bru Zane, May 2016
