= Feuille d'album =

Feuille d'album may refer to:

- Album leaf, a short musical composition also known as feuille d'album or feuillet d'album
- Feuilles d'album, S.165 (Liszt), a piano piece by Franz Liszt
- Feuillet d'album, Op.81, a four-hand piano piece by Camille Saint-Saëns
- Feuille d'Album (short story), a short story by Katherine Mansfield
