= Vehmic court =

Courts in the later Middle Ages in Westphalia, Germany

The Vehmic courts, Vehmgericht, holy vehme, or simply Vehm, also spelled Feme, Vehmegericht, Fehmgericht, are names given to a tribunal system of Westphalia in Germany active during the Late Middle Ages, based on a fraternal organisation of lay judges called "free judges" (German: Freischöffen or French: francs-juges). The original seat of the courts was in Dortmund. Proceedings were sometimes secret, leading to the alternative titles of "secret courts" (German: heimliches Gericht), "silent courts" (German: Stillgericht), or "forbidden courts" (German: verbotene Gerichte). After the execution of a death sentence, the corpse could be hanged on a tree to advertise the fact and deter others.

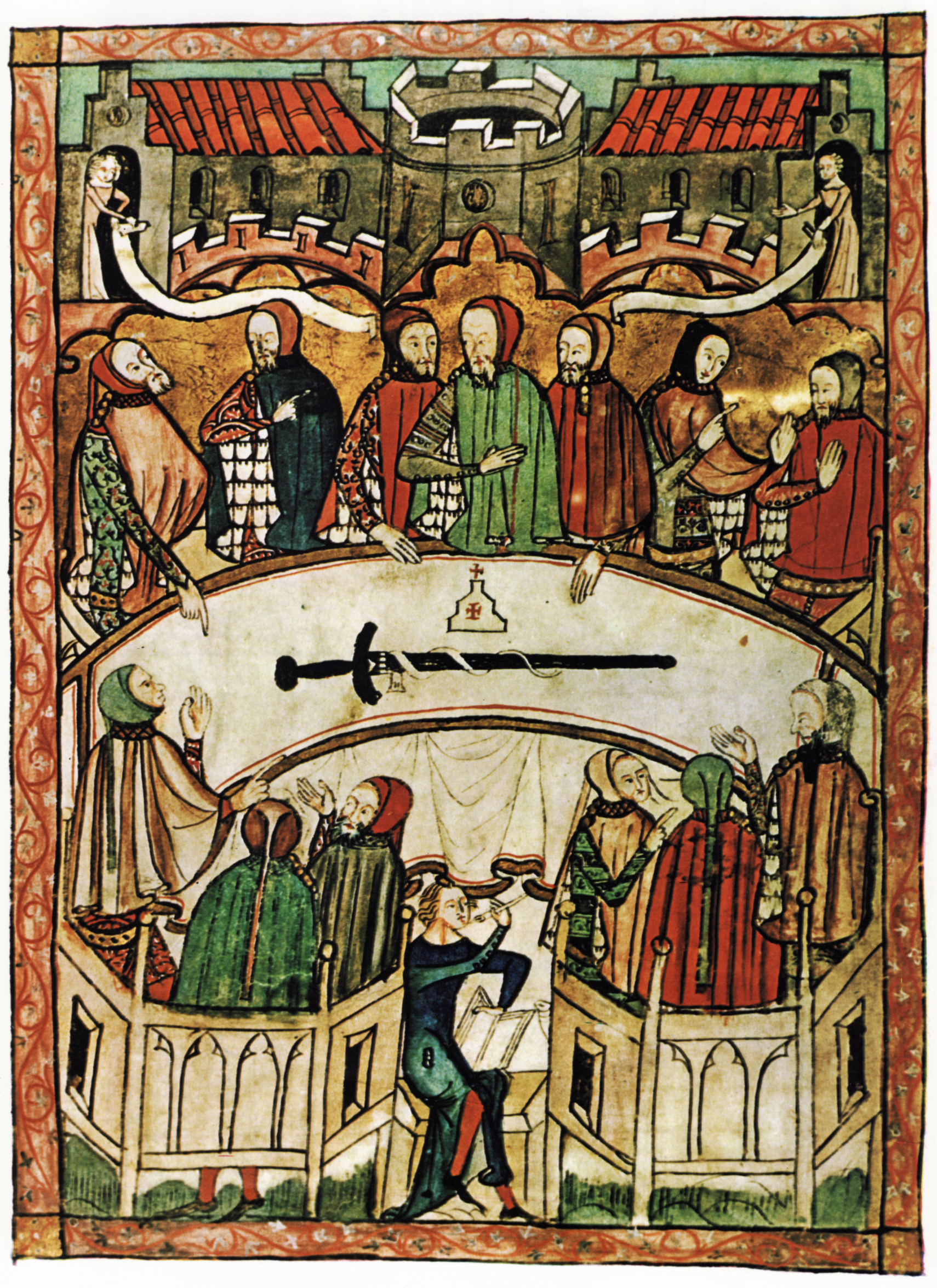
A Vehm on a miniature in Herforder Rechtsbuch (ca 1375)

The peak of activity of these courts was during the 14th to 15th centuries, with lesser activity attested for the 13th and 16th centuries, and scattered evidence establishing their continued existence during the 17th and 18th centuries. They were finally abolished by order of Jérôme Bonaparte, king of Westphalia, in 1811.

The Vehmic courts were the regional courts of Westphalia, which, in turn, were based on the county courts of Franconia. They received their jurisdiction from the Holy Roman Emperor, from whom they also received the capacity to pronounce capital punishment (German: Blutgericht) which they exercised in his name. Everywhere else the power of life and death, originally reserved to the Emperor alone, had been usurped by the territorial nobles; only in Westphalia, called "the Red Earth" because here the imperial Blutbann (jurisdiction over life and death) was still valid, were capital sentences passed and executed by the Vehmic courts in the Emperor's name alone.

== Etymology ==
The term's origin is uncertain, but seems to enter Middle High German from Middle Low German. The word vëme first appears in the Middle High German literature of the 13th century as a noun with the meaning of "punishment". A document dated to 1251 has the reference illud occultum judicium, quod vulgariter vehma seu vridinch appellari consuevit. ("It is hidden justice, that by common fashion is habitually referred to as vehma or vridinch.") The general meaning of "punishment" is unrelated to the special courts of Westphalia which were thus originally just named "courts of punishment". But as the word entered the Southern German dialects via Saxony and Westphalia, the word's meaning in Early Modern German became attached to the activities of these courts specifically.

Jacob Grimm thought that the word is identical in origin to a homophonous word for the raising of pigs on forest pastures (Hutewald), just as the more familiar German Zucht can mean both breeding and discipline. Grimm considers the spelling with h unetymological in spite of its early occurrence in some 13th century documents, and hypothesizes a "lost root" "fëmen", connecting with Old Norse fimr and conjecturing a Gothic "fiman, fam, fêmun?".

During 18th to 19th century Romanticism, there were various misguided attempts to explain the obscure term, or to elevate it to the status of a remnant of pagan antiquity, scoffed at by Grimm's entry in his Deutsches Wörterbuch. An etymology suggested by James Skene in 1824 derives the word from Baumgericht (Lit. "Tree law"), supposedly the remnant of a pagan "forest law" of the Wild hunt and pagan secret societies.

== Origin ==
The Westphalian Vehmic courts developed from the High Medieval "free courts" (Freigerichte), which had jurisdiction within a "free county" (German: Freigrafschaft). As a result of the 14th century imperial reform of the Holy Roman Empire (Golden Bull of 1356), the Landgraviates lost much of their power, and the Freigerichte disappeared, with the exception of Westphalia, where they retained their authority and transformed into the Vehmic court.

The seat of the Vehmic court (German: Freistuhl) was at first Dortmund, in a square between two linden trees, one of which was known as the Femelinde. With the growing influence of Cologne during the 15th century, the seat was moved to Arnsberg in 1437.

== Membership and procedure ==
The sessions were often held in secret, whence the names of "secret court" (German: heimliches Gericht), "silent court" (German: Stillgericht), etc. Attendance of secret sessions was forbidden to the uninitiated, on pain of death, which led to the designation "forbidden courts" (German: verbotene Gerichte). A chairman (German: Stuhlherr) presided over the court, and lay judges (German: Freischöffen) passed judgment. The court also constituted a Holy Order.

Any free man "of pure bred German stock" and of good character could become a judge. The new candidate was given secret information and identification symbols. The "knowing one" (German: Wissende) had to keep his knowledge secret, even from his closest family ("vor Weib und Kind, vor Sand und Wind"). Lay judges had to give formal warnings to known troublemakers, issue warrants, and take part in executions.

The organization of the Fehme was elaborate. The centre of each jurisdiction was referred to as a "free seat" (German: Freistuhl), and its head or chairman (German: Stuhlherr) was often a secular or spiritual prince, or sometimes a civic community leader. The archbishop of Cologne sat at the top of the hierarchy, "supreme over all" (German: Oberststuhlherren). The actual president of the court was the "free count" (German: Freigraf), chosen for life by the Stuhlherr from among the Freischöffen, who formed the great body of the initiated. Of these the lowest rank were the Fronboten or Freifronen, charged with the maintenance of order in the courts and the duty of carrying out the commands of the Freigraf. The immense development of the Fehme is explained by the privileges of the Freischöffen; for they were subject to no jurisdiction but those of the Westphalian courts: whether as accused or accuser they had access to the secret sessions, and they shared in the discussions of the general chapter as to the policy of the society. At their initiation these swore to support the Fehme with all their powers, to guard its secrets, and to bring before its tribunal anything within its competence that they might discover. They were then initiated into the secret signs by which members recognized each other, and were presented with a rope and with a knife on which were engraved the mystic letters S.S.G.G., supposed to mean Stein, Strick, Gras, grün (stone, rope, grass, green).

"A summons to appear before the court was nailed to his door": illustration from an article about Vehmic courts in a children’s annual

The Freistuhl was the place of session, and was usually a hillock, or some other well-known and accessible spot. The Freigraf and the Schöffen (judges) occupied the bench, before which a table, with a sword and rope upon it, was placed. The court was held by day and, unless the session was declared secret, all freemen, whether initiated or not, were admitted. The accusation was in the old German form; but only a Freischöffe could act as accuser. If the offence came under the competence of the court, meaning it was punishable by death, a summons to the accused was issued under the seal of the Freigraf. This was not usually served on him personally, but was nailed to his door, or to some convenient place where he was certain to pass. Six weeks and three days' grace were allowed, according to the old Saxon law, and the summons was thrice repeated. If the accused appeared, the accuser stated the case, and the investigation proceeded by the examination of witnesses as in an ordinary court of law. The judgment was put into execution on the spot if that was possible.

The secret court, from whose procedure the whole institution has acquired its evil reputation, was closed to all but the initiated, although these were so numerous as to secure quasi-publicity; any one not a member on being discovered was instantly put to death, and the members present were bound under the same penalty not to disclose what took place. Crimes of a serious nature, and especially those that were deemed unfit for ordinary judicial investigation, such as heresy and witchcraft, fell within its jurisdiction, as also did appeals by persons condemned in the open courts, and likewise the cases before those tribunals in which the accused had not appeared. The accused, if a member, could clear himself by his own oath, unless he had revealed the secrets of the Fehme. If he were one of the uninitiated it was necessary for him to bring forward witnesses to his innocence from among the initiated, whose number varied according to the number on the side of the accuser, but twenty-one in favour of innocence necessarily secured an acquittal. The only punishment which the secret court could inflict was death. If the accused appeared, the sentence was carried into execution at once; if he did not appear, it was quickly made known to the whole body, and the Freischöffe who was the first to meet the condemned was bound to put him to death. This was usually done by hanging, the nearest tree serving for gallows. A knife with the mystic letters was left beside the corpse to show that the deed was not a murder.

It has been claimed that, in some cases, the condemned would be set free, given several hours' head start and then hunted down and put to death. So fearsome was the reputation of the Fehme and its reach that many thus released committed suicide rather than prolonging the inevitable. This practice could have been a holdover from the ancient Germanic legal concept of outlawry (Acht).

Legend and romance have combined to exaggerate the sinister reputation of the Fehmic courts; but modern historical research has largely discounted this, proving that they never employed torture, that their sittings were only sometimes secret, and that their meeting-places were always well known.

== The spread of the Vehmic courts ==
The system, though ancient, came into wider use only after the division of the duchy of Saxony after the fall of Henry the Lion, when the archbishop of Cologne Engelbert II of Berg, (also duke of Westphalia from 1180) placed himself at the head of the Fehme as representative of the emperor. The organization then spread rapidly. Every free man born in lawful wedlock and not excommunicated nor an outlaw was eligible for membership.

Princes and nobles were initiated; and in 1429 even the Emperor Sigismund himself became "a true and proper Freischöffe of the Holy Roman Empire." There is a manuscript in the Town Hall of the Westphalian town of Soest which consists of an original Vehmic Court Regulation document, along with illustrations.

By the middle of the 14th century, these Freischöffen (Latin scabini), sworn associates of the Fehme, were scattered in thousands throughout the length and breadth of Germany, known to each other by secret signs and pass-words, and all of them pledged to serve the summons of the secret courts and to execute their judgment.

== Decline and dissolution of the Courts ==
That an organization of this character should have outlived its usefulness and ushered in corruption and other intolerable abuses was inevitable; from the mid-fifteenth century protests were raised against the enormities of the court.

With the growing power of the territorial sovereigns and the gradual improvement of the ordinary process of justice, the functions of the Fehmic courts were superseded. By the action of the Emperor Maximilian and of other German princes they were, in the 16th century, once more restricted to Westphalia, and here, too, they were brought under the jurisdiction of the ordinary courts, and finally confined to mere police duties. With these functions, however, but with the old forms long since robbed of their impressiveness, they survived into the 19th century. They were finally abolished by order of Jérôme Bonaparte, king of Westphalia, in 1811. The last Freigraf died in 1835.

== Modern use of the term ==
Following the abandonment of the Vehmic courts, the term acquired a connotation of mob rule and lynching. In Modern German, the spelling of Feme is most common. Other variant forms are: Fehme, Feime, Veme. The verb verfemen is in current use and means "to ostracise", i.e. by public opinion rather than formal legal proceeding. A noun derived from this is Verfemter "outlaw, ostracised person".

The term was used in this sense — of "mob justice" bubbling up from below — by writers such as Thomas Carlyle (1840) and Karl Marx (1856).

Within the politically heated turmoil of the early German Weimar Republic after World War I, the media frequently used the term Fememord to refer to right-wing political homicides, e.g. the murder of Jewish politicians such as Kurt Eisner (1919) or Walther Rathenau (1922) and other politicians including Matthias Erzberger (1921) by right-wing groups such as Organisation Consul. In 1926, the 27th Reichstag commission officially differentiated the contemporarily common Fememorde from political assassination in that assassination was by definition exerted upon open political opponents, whereas a Fememord was a form of lethal vengeance committed upon former or current members of an organization that they had become a traitor to. This definition is also found in the pseudo-archaic, alliterative right-wing phrase "Verräter verfallen der Feme!" ("Traitors shall be ostracized!", i. e. killed), quoted throughout the 1920s in mass media reports regarding violent acts of vengeance among the German Right.

== The Vehmic courts in fiction ==
Vehmic courts play a key role in the novel Anne of Geierstein or, The Maiden of the Mist by Sir Walter Scott in which Archibald von Hagenbach, the Duke of Burgundy's governor at Brisach (Switzerland), is condemned and executed by the Vehmgericht. Scott drew his inspiration from Goethe's play Goetz von Berlichingen which he had translated, incorrectly. Hector Berlioz's first opera, Les francs-juges, was inspired by Scott's presentation of the Vehmic Courts. Though the work was never staged the overture survives as a concert piece. In the very first concert of Berlioz's work, on 26 May 1828, the overture was performed along with the Opus 1 Waverley overture, a further indication of Berlioz's debt to Scott's fiction. The Les francs-juges overture later became the signature tune for Face to Face, the early series of British television interviews presented by John Freeman.

In William Makepeace Thackeray's novel Vanity Fair "Was Rebecca guilty or not?" the Vehmgericht of the servants' hall had pronounced against her.

A character in the Dorothy L. Sayers novel Murder Must Advertise appears at a fancy-dress party as a member of the Vehmgericht, which allows him to wear a hooded costume to disguise his identity. People in Femgericht costumes also appear in Arthur Schnitzler's 1926 novella Dream Story.

In Fritz Lang's M, the local criminals of an unnamed city (probably Berlin) capture a child murderer and hold a vigilante court.

In The Illuminatus! Trilogy, the Vehmic courts are mentioned as being connected to Nazi Werwolf commandos as well as the Illuminati.

In A Study in Scarlet, a Sherlock Holmes novel by Arthur Conan Doyle, a newspaper article mentions the Vehmgericht, stating that the features of a recent death are similar to the organization's killings.

The Vehmgericht also appear as antagonists in The Strong Arm, an 1899 novel set in the Holy Roman Empire by British-Canadian author Robert Barr.

Geoff Taylor's 1966 novel, Court of Honor, features the Fehme being revived by a German officer and Martin Bormann in the dying days of the Third Reich.

Season 3, episode 12 of The Blacklist, titled The Vehm is based on a group of vigilantes using medieval torture methods to kill paedophiles and money launderers.

Jack Mayer's 2015 historical fiction, Before the Court of Heaven, depicts the Fehme, and 'Fehme justice' as part of the extreme right-wing conspiracy to bring down Germany's Weimar democracy.

== See also ==
- Feme murders
