= Tristia (disambiguation) =

Tristia is a work of poetry written by the Roman poet Ovid at some time after he was banished from Rome in AD 8.

Tristia may also refer to:

- Tristia (city), a fictional location in the game Tristia of the Deep-Blue Sea
- Tristia (Berlioz), a musical work published in 1852
- Tristia Harrison (born 1973), a British businesswoman
