= Album leaf =

Title of numerous minor compositions by a wide variety of classical composers

Album leaf is the title of numerous minor compositions by a wide variety of classical composers. It also appears in the French version, Feuille d'album or Feuillet d'album; the German version Albumblatt (pl. Albumblätter); the Russian version Листок из альбома (pl. Листки из альбома); the Spanish and Latin-American versions Hoja de álbum; and other languages.

Many of these pieces are for piano solo, but the title has also been used for other instrumental pieces in the salon music genre, and for vocal pieces. They tend to be short, pleasant, and not particularly demanding on the performer. There is no standard form or structure; the title Album leaf is quite arbitrary, and these pieces could just as easily have been called Prelude, Impromptu, Romance, Humoresque or other names.

Originally, the term "Album leaf" was used for pieces written in dedication to a friend or admirer, to be inserted into their album or autograph book, and not intended for publication. It later lost any association with a particular dedicatee.

== List of Album leaves ==
The following pieces are for piano solo unless otherwise indicated.

- Joachim Andersen:
  - Albumblatt, Op. 19
- Ludovic Lamothe
  - Album Leaf No. 1 in F♯ minor
  - Album Leaf No. 2 in D♭ major
- Béla Bartók:
  - Albumblatt: Andante in A major for violin and piano
- Friedrich Baumfelder:
  - Feuille d'Album, Op. 51 (1854)
  - Albumblätter: Drei Präludienartige Stücke für Piano, Op. 175 (1850)
- Ludwig van Beethoven:
  - Für Elise, usually classified as a bagatelle, is sometimes referred to as an Albumblatt
- Hector Berlioz:
  - Feuillets d'album - 6 songs (Zaide; Les champs; Le Chant des chemins de fer; Prière du matin; La belle Isabau; Le chasseur danois), Op. 19 (1850)
- Georges Bizet:
  - Feuilles d'album - 6 songs (À une fleur (de Musset), Adieux à Suzon (de Musset), Sonnet (Ronsard), Guitare (Hugo), Rose d'amour (Millevoye), Le grillon (Lamartine)) (1866)
- August de Boeck:
  - Feuillet d'album for viola and piano (ca. 1892)
- Johannes Brahms:
  - Albumblatt (1853)
- Louis Brassin:
  - Feuillet d'album
- Ignaz Brüll:
  - 7 Albumblätter, Op.33 (undated; c.1880)
- August Bungert:
  - Album leaf (1885)
- Ferruccio Busoni:
  - Albumblatt in E minor for flute (or muted violin) and piano (1916)
  - Albumblatt in E minor for piano (1917)
- André Caplet:
  - Feuillets d'album for flute and piano (1901)
- Emmanuel Chabrier:
  - Feuillet d'album
- Cécile Chaminade:
  - 6 Feuillets d'album (Promenade; Scherzetto; Élégie; Valse arabesque; Chanson russe; Rondo allegre), Op. 98 (1900)
- Carlos Chávez:
  - Feuille d'album for guitar (1974)
- Frédéric Chopin:
  - Album Leaf (Moderato) in E major, B. 151
- Ernő Dohnányi:
  - Albumblatt (1899)
- Gabriel Dupont:
  - Feuillets d'Album (1897)
- Antonín Dvořák:
  - 4 Album leaves, B. 109 (1880)
  - Album leaf, B. 158 (1888)
- Gabrielle Ferrari:
  - Feuilles d'album, Op. 76
- Zdeněk Fibich:
  - 5 Feuillets d'album, Op. 2
- Wilhelm Fitzenhagen:
  - Album Leaf for cello and piano, Op. 26
- Niels Gade:
  - Albumsblade (1852)
  - Albumblad in C major (1860)
- Sir Edward German:
  - Album Leaf (1892)
  - Album Leaf for violin and piano
- Alexander Glazunov:
  - Albumblatt for trumpet and piano (1899)
- Reinhold Glière:
  - 12 Album Leaves for cello and piano, Op. 51 (1910)
- Mikhail Goldstein:
  - "Albumblatt (Листок из Альбома) by Glazunov", a musical hoax
- Edvard Grieg:
  - 4 Album Leaves, Op. 28
  - Album Leaf (1878)
  - Album Leaf No. 2 from Lyric Pieces, Book IV, Op. 47
  - Album Leaf No. 7 (Lyric Pieces), Op. 12
- Friedrich Grützmacher:
  - Albumblatt, Op. 66 (1897)
- Stephen Heller:
  - Feuillet d'album, Op. 118/2
  - 3 Feuillets d'album, Op. 157
- Bertold Hummel:
  - Albumblatt for viola and piano, Op. 87a (1897)
- Engelbert Humperdinck:
  - Albumblatt in F major for violin and piano (1910)
- Salomon Jadassohn:
  - Albumblatt, Op. 7 (1862)
  - Albumblatt, Op. 39 (1872)
  - 5 Albumblätter, Op. 63 (1881)
  - Albumblatt (1881; unpublished)
- Dmitry Kabalevsky:
  - Album Leaves (Albumstücke) for violin and piano
- Friedrich Kiel:
  - Albumblatt
- Theodor Kirchner:
  - Albumleaves, Op. 7
  - New Album Leaves: 2 Character Pieces, Op. 49
  - Albumblätter (Neue Folge), Op. 80
  - Albumblatt for violin and piano
- Conradin Kreutzer:
  - Album Leaf (1882)
- Lowell Liebermann
  - Album Leaf for cello and piano, Op. 66 (1999)
- Franz Liszt:
  - S.158c, Adagio in C major (Dante Sonata Albumleaf) (1844–45)
  - S.163a/1, Album-Leaf in F♯ minor (1828)
  - S.163b, Album-Leaf (Ah vous dirai-je, maman) (1833)
  - S.163c, Album-Leaf in C minor (Pressburg) (1839)
  - S.163d, Album-Leaf in E major (Leipzig) (1840)
  - S.164, Feuille d'album No. 1 (1840)
  - S.164a, Album-Leaf in E major (Vienna) (1840)
  - S.164b, Album-Leaf in E♭ major (Leipzig) (1840)
  - S.164c, Album-Leaf: Exeter Preludio (1841)
  - S.164d, Album-Leaf in E major (Detmold) (1840)
  - S.164e, Album-Leaf: Magyar (1841)
  - S.164f, Album-Leaf in A minor (Rákóczi-Marsch) (1841)
  - S.164g, Album-Leaf: Berlin Preludio (1842)
  - S.165, Feuilles d'album in A♭ major (1841)
  - S.166, Albumblatt in waltzerform (1841)
  - S.166a, Album-Leaf in E major (1843)
  - S.166b, Album-Leaf in A♭ major (Portugal) (1844)
  - S.166c, Album-Leaf in A♭ major (1844)
  - S.166d, Album-Leaf: Lyon prélude (1844)
  - S.166e, Album-Leaf: Prélude omnitonique (1844)
  - S.166f, Album-Leaf: Braunschweig preludio (1844)
  - S.166g, Album-Leaf: Serenade (1840–49)
  - S.166h, Album-Leaf: Andante religioso (1846)
  - S.166k, Album-Leaf in A major: Friska (ca. 1846–49)
  - S.166l/1, Album-Leaf in A♭ major: Andante con moto (ca. 1840)
  - S.166l/2, Album-Leaf in G minor: Weimar III (ca. 1840)
  - S.166m-n, Albumblätter für Prinzessin Marie von Sayn-Wittgenstein (1847)
  - S.166y/2, Album-Leaf in A minor: Introduction à la Grande Étude de Paganini (ca. 1884)
  - S.167, Feuille d'album No. 2 [Die Zelle in Nonnenwerth, third version] (1843)
  - S.167c, Album-Leaf (from the Agnus Dei of the Missa Solennis, S9) (1860–69)
  - S.167d, Album-Leaf (from the symphonic poem Orpheus, S98) (1860)
  - S.167e, Album-Leaf (from the symphonic poem Die Ideale, S106) (1861)
  - S.167f, Album-Leaf in G major (ca. 1860)
  - S.167r, Album-Leaf: Andante (1850–59; unfinished)
  - S.171b, Album Leaf or Consolation No. 1 (1870–79)
- Henri Marteau:
  - Feuillet d'Album No. 2 in D minor for viola and piano, Op. 2
- Joseph Marx
  - Albumblatt in E major (1916)
  - Albumblatt in F major (alternative names: "Romanze", "Moderne Klavierstudie"; undated)
- Nikolai Medtner:
  - Album Leaf (Листок из альбома) (1900)
- Felix Mendelssohn:
  - Album-leaf in E minor, Op. 117 (1837)
- Moritz Moszkowski:
  - Albumblatt, Op. 2
  - Feuillet d'album No. 2 from "Trois Morceaux". Op. 86 (1911)
- Modest Mussorgsky:
  - Méditation (feuillet d'album) (1880)
- Tivadar Nachéz:
  - Albumblatt (1884)
- Friedrich Nietzsche:
  - Albumblatt
- Thomas Pasatieri:
  - Album Leaves (Volume 1) for voice and piano
  - Album Leaves (Volume 2) for voice and piano
  - Album Leaves (Volume 3) for voice and piano
  - Album Leaves (Volume 4) for voice and piano
- David Popper:
  - Albumblatt for cello and piano (1883)
- Edouard Potjes:
  - Feuillet d'Album
- Max Reger:
  - Albumblatt (Andantino) No. 2 in D minor from "Nine Bunte Blätter for Piano", Op. 36 (1899)
  - Albumblatt No. 1 in B minor (Mit Ausdruck, nicht zu langsam) from "Ten little Pieces for Piano", Op. 44 (1900)
  - Albumblatt No. 1 from "Two Compositions for Violin and Piano", Op. 87 (1905)
  - Albumblatt No. 4 from "Grüsse an die Jugend" (1898)
  - Three Album leaves (Miniature Gavotte; Allegretto grazioso; Andante) (1898–99)
  - Albumblad No. 1 from "Blätter und Blüten" (1900–02)
  - Albumblatt in E♭ major for clarinet/violin and piano (1902)
- Camille Saint-Saëns:
  - Feuillet d'album, Op. 169 (1921)
  - Feuillet d'album (1909)
- Carlos Salzedo:
  - Feuillet d'album No. 2 for soprano, harp, and piano from "Three Poems of Stephane Mallarme" (1924)
- Philipp Scharwenka:
  - 5 Albumblätter, Op.27 (1878)
- Franz Schubert:
  - Walzer in G called "Albumblatt", D. 844
- Robert Schumann:
  - Albumblätter (includes one piece previously part of WoO 31), Op. 124 (1832–45)
- Alexander Scriabin:
  - Album Leaf No. 1 in E flat major from "Trois morceaux", Op. 45
  - Album Leaf, Op. 58
  - Feuillet d'Album de Monighetti in A♭ major (1889)
  - Feuillet d'Album in F♯ major (1905)
- Hans Sitt:
  - 6 Albumblätter for viola and piano, Op. 39 (published 1891)
- Bedřich Smetana:
  - 6 Album Leaves (To Kateřina Kolářová; To Elizabeth Felicia Thun; To Josephina Fink; To Jean Kunz; To Wenzel Ulwer; To Marie Proksch) (1844–62)
  - 6 Album Leaves (1849–50)
  - 3 Album Leaves (To Robert Schumann; Wanderer's Song; Es siedet und braust) (1849–50)
  - 6 Album Leaves (1849–50)
  - 7 other single Album Leaves
- Juan María Solare:
  - Albumblatt
- John Philip Sousa:
  - An Album Leaf for violin (1863)
- Zygmunt Stojowski:
  - Feuillet d'album, Op. 19/1
  - Deux Feuilles d'album
- Robert Stolz:
  - Albumblatt, Op.1 (1895)
- Josef Suk:
  - Album Leaf No. 1 from "3 Songs without Words" (1891)
  - Album Leaf in F major (1895)
- Alexander Taneyev:
  - Album Leaf (Листок из альбома) in G major for viola and piano, Op. 33
- Pyotr Ilyich Tchaikovsky:
  - Feuillet d'album, Op. 19/3
- Sigismond Thalberg:
  - Albumblatt
- Rudolf Tillmetz:
  - Album leaf for flute and piano, Op. 8
- Louis Vierne:
  - Feuillets d'album (Matin d'été; Contemplation; La mer et la nuit; Nuit étoilée; Coup de vent; Le vieux berger; La valse; Dans le bois; Chanson des faucheurs), Op. 9
- Henri Vieuxtemps:
  - 3 Feuilles d'album for violin and piano, Op. 40 (1864)
- Richard Wagner:
  - Albumblatt für Ernst Benedikt Kietz: Lied ohne Worte, WWV 64 (1840)
  - In das Album der Fürstin M. [Metternich], WWV 94 (1861)
  - Albumblatt für Frau Betty Schott, WWV 108 (1875)
- Kurt Weill:
  - Albumblatt for Erika (1937; transcription of the pastorale from Der Weg der Verheissung)
- Charles-Marie Widor:
  - 12 Feuillets d’album, Op. 31 (1877; No. 11 was transcribed by Marcel Dupré for organ as Marche américaine)
- Charles Wuorinen:
  - Album Leaf (1984)
- Sergei Yuferov:
  - Entre petits et grands amis: 6 Album Leaves (Листки из альбома) (Boite à musique; Aveu; Mazurca; Petite valse; Question et réponse; Mélodie), Op. 10
  - En famille, 6 Album Leaves (Листки из альбома) (Feuille d'album; Petite étude; Impatience; Charmeuse; Un conte; Caprice), Op. 12
- Alexander von Zemlinsky:
  - Albumblatt (Erinnerung aus Wien) (1895)
- Alberto Nepomuceno:
  - Folhas d'álbum (1891)
- Richard Zeckwer:
  - Album Leaf (preceded by Notturno) (1874)
