= Jules Janin =

French writer and critic (1804–1874)

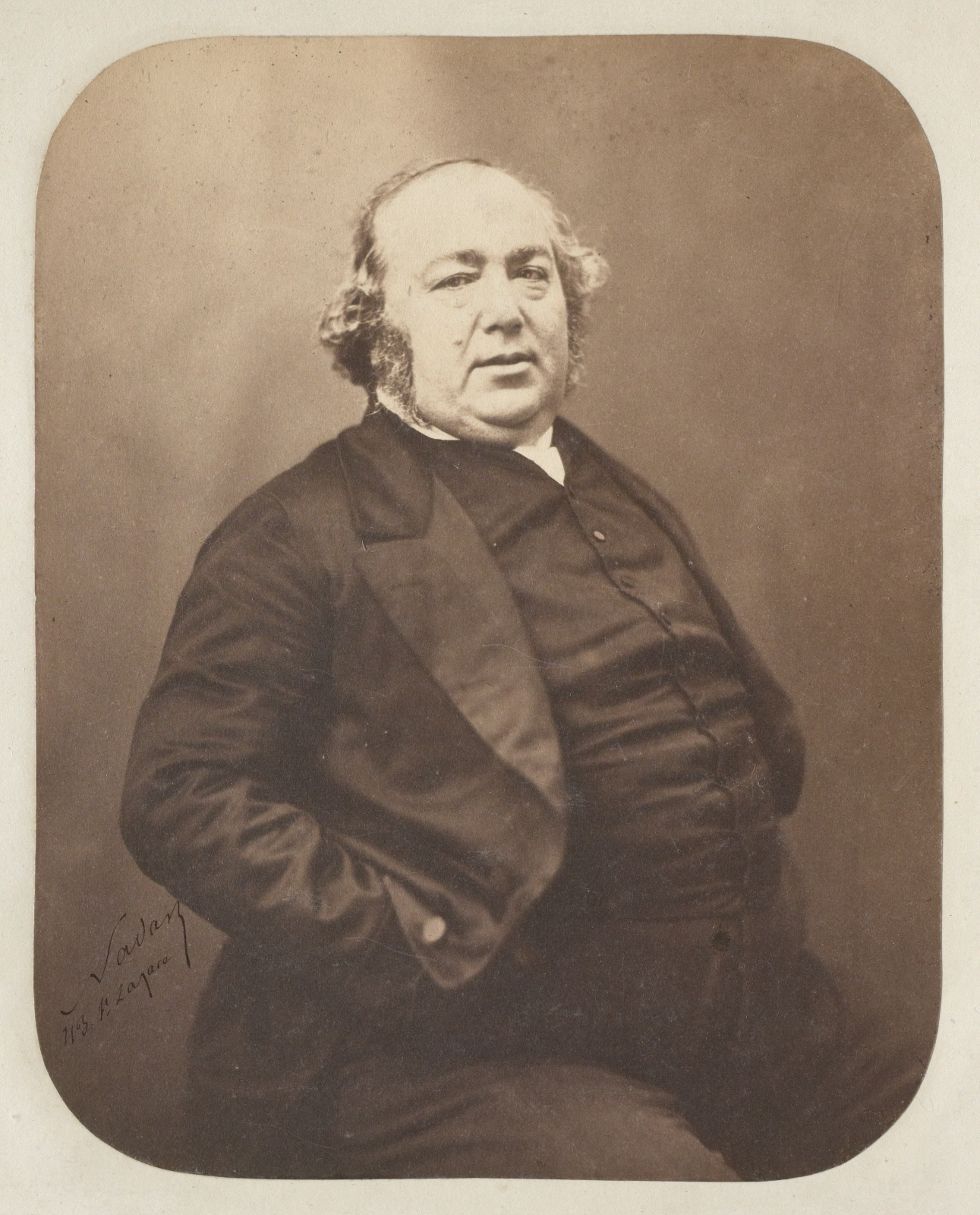
- Nadar's portrait of Jules Janin c. 1856, salt print from wet-collodion-on-glass negative, Clark Art Institute, Williamstown
- Born: Gabriel-Jules Janin; 16 February 1804; Saint-Étienne, France
- Died: 19 June 1874 (aged 70); Paris, France

Jules Gabriel Janin (French pronunciation: [ʒyl ɡabʁijɛl ʒanɛ̃]; 16 February 1804 – 19 June 1874) was a French writer and critic.

== Life and career ==
Born in Saint-Étienne (Loire), Janin's father was a lawyer, and he was educated first at St. Étienne, and then at the lycée Louis-le-Grand in Paris. He involved himself in journalism from an early date, and worked on the Figaro and the Quotidienne, among others, until in 1830 he became dramatic critic of the Journal des Débats.

Long before, however, he had made a literary reputation for himself, publishing novels such as L'Âne mort et la Femme guillotinée ("The Dead Donkey and the Guillotined Woman") (1829). La Confession (1830) followed, and then in Barnave (1831), he attacked the Orléans family. From the day when Janin became the theatrical critic of the Débats, though he continued to write books, he was most notable in France as a dramatic critic. Janin authored the text for the song Le Chant des chemins de fer by Hector Berlioz, a composer and fellow critic at the Débats.

After many years of feuilleton writing he collected some of his articles in the work called Histoire de la littérature dramatique en France (1853-1858). In 1865 he made his first attempt upon the Academy, but was not successful until five years later. Meanwhile, he had not been content with his feuilletons, written persistently about all manner of things. No one was more in request with the Paris publishers for prefaces, letterpress to illustrated books and suchlike. He was accused of taking bribes for favourable reviews, reputedly earning 6,000 to 8,000 francs from fearful playwrights on a premier.

Janin traveled (picking up in one of his journeys a country house at Lucca in a lottery), and wrote accounts of his travels. He wrote numerous tales and novels, and composed many other works, including Fin d'un monde et du neveu de Rameau (1861), in which, under the guise of a sequel to Diderot's work, he showed his familiarity with the late 18th century. He married in 1841. In the early part of his career he had many quarrels, notably one with Felix Pyat (1810-1889), whom he prosecuted successfully for defamation of character.

For the most part his work was improvisation, noted for its light and vivid style. His Œuvres choisies (12 vols., 1875–1878) were edited by Albert Patin de La Fizelière. A study on Janin with a bibliography was published by Auguste Piédagnel in 1874. See also Sainte-Beuve, Causeries du lundi, ii. and v., and Gustave Planche, Portraits littéraires.

== Works ==
- The Dead Donkey and the Guillotined Woman (English translation ed. by Terry Hale, Gargoyle, 1993)
