= Félix Pyat =

French socialist journalist, playwright and politician

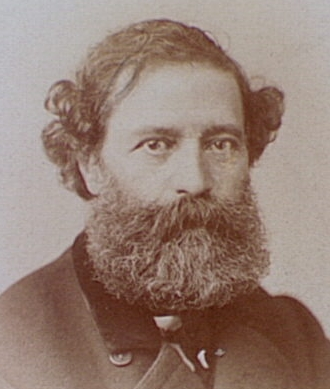
- Félix Pyat in 1871

Personal details
- Born: 4 October 1810 Vierzon, Cher, First French Empire
- Died: 3 August 1889 (aged 78) Saint-Gratien, Third French Republic

Félix Pyat (4 October 1810 – 3 August 1889) was a French socialist journalist, playwright, politician and a leading figure of the Paris Commune.

== Biography ==
He was born in Vierzon (Cher), to an upper middle-class family. His father had been a priest before the French Revolution, later secularizing, marrying, and becoming a lawyer and political Legitimist. Pyat passed the Paris bar in 1831, but never practiced law instead throwing his whole energies into journalism.

During the 1830s and 1840s Pyat enjoyed success as a journalist, critic and playwright helped along by writers such as Jules Janin, Henri LaTouche, and George Sand. In politics Pyat's work took on an increasing anti-monarchist and pro-socialist, and romantic stance. Important influences were Victor Hugo and Eugène Sue. The violent personal attacks in a pamphlet entitled Marie-Joseph Chénier et le prince des critiques (1844), in reply to Jules Janin led the later to successfully sue him for libel earning Pyat a six months' sojourn in the Sainte-Pélagie prison, in the cell just vacated by Lamennais, along with being considered a minor political "martyr" of the July Monarchy. In 1846 he edited the collected works of Claude Tillier in four volumes and wrote a detailed introduction to Tillier's biography and work. His most successful work was "Chiffonier de Paris" in 1847.

=== 1848 Revolution ===
He worked with other dramatists in a long series of plays, with an interval of six years on the National, until the revolution of 1848. George Sand, whom he had introduced in 1830 to the staff of Le Figaro, now asked Ledru-Rollin to make him commissary-general of the Cher. After three months' tenure of this office he was elected by the Cher department to the constituent assembly, where he voted with the Mountain, and brought forward the celebrated motion for the abolition of the presidential office.

About this time he fought a duel with Proudhon, who had called him the aristocrat of democracy. He joined Ledru-Rollin in the attempted insurrection of 13 June 1849, after which he sought refuge in Switzerland, Belgium, and finally in England, where he became involved with the irregular masonic organisation, La Grande Loge des Philadelphes. For having glorified regicide after Orsini's attempt on the life of Napoleon III he was brought before an English court, but acquitted, and the general amnesty of 1869 permitted his return to France. However, further outbursts against the authorities, followed by prosecution, compelled him to return to England.

=== Paris Commune ===
The deposing of Napoleon III on 4 September 1870 brought him back to Paris, and it was he who in his paper Le Combat displayed a black-edged announcement of the negotiations for the surrender of Metz to the Prussians. After the insurrection of 31 October he was imprisoned for a short time. In January 1871, Le Combat was suppressed, only to be followed by an equally virulent Vengeur.

Elected to the National Assembly of France, he retired from Bordeaux, where it sat, with Henri Rochefort and others until such time as the so-called "parricidal" vote for peace should be annulled. He returned to Paris to join the Committee of Public Safety, and, in Hanotaux's words, was the me ulcre of the Paris Commune, but was blamed for the loss of the fort of Issy. He was superseded on the committee by Delescluze, but he continued to direct some of the violent acts of the Commune, the overthrow of the Vendôme column, the destruction of Adolphe Thiers's residence and of the expiatory chapel built to the memory of Louis XVI. He escaped the vengeance of the Versailles government, crossed the frontier in safety, and, though he had been condemned to death in his absence in 1873, the general amnesty of July 1880 permitted his return to Paris.

He was elected to the Chamber of Deputies for the department of Bouches-du-Rhône in March 1888 and took his seat on the extreme Left, but died at Saint-Gratien the following year.
