= D. Kern Holoman =

American musicologist and conductor (born 1947)

- Born: Dallas Kern Holoman; September 8, 1947 (age 78); Raleigh, North Carolina
- Education: Duke University (B.A., 1969); Princeton University (Ph.D., 1974)
- Occupations: Musicologist and conductor
- Website: hector.ucdavis.edu/DKH.html

Dallas Kern Holoman (born September 8, 1947) is an American musicologist and conductor, particularly known for his scholarship on the life and works of Hector Berlioz.

== Life and career ==
Holoman was born in Raleigh, North Carolina on September 8, 1947, to W. Kern and Katherine Highsmith Holoman. He attended Duke University as an undergraduate, receiving his Bachelor of Arts in music in 1969. After receiving a Master of Fine Arts from Princeton University in 1971, he received a Fulbright Fellowship and embarked on his doctoral dissertation, Autograph Musical Documents of Hector Berlioz, c. 1818–1840. He joined the faculty of University of California, Davis as Acting Assistant Professor of Music in 1973 and the following year received his Ph.D. from Princeton. He remained at UC Davis for the rest of his academic career, becoming Professor of Music in 1981 and serving as the Chairman of the Music Department from 1980 to 1988. In 2000, he became the Barbara K. Jackson Professor of Orchestral Conducting. In July 2013, Holoman retired from full professorship, but continued to teach as of 2016.

In December 2017, Holoman relinquished the titles of professor emeritus and distinguished professor after being accused of sexually assaulting a student in 1987 at UC Davis. The university also revealed that Holoman was suspended for a month in 1997 over a different allegation of "unprofessional conduct" and told he could be fired if he violated the campus sexual harassment policy again. Action was also taken by the American Musicological Society's Board of Directors who condemned his misconduct and rescinded his honorary membership of the Society.

== Musicology ==
Holoman was one of the founding editors of the journal 19th-Century Music in 1977 (with Joseph Kerman and Robert Winter) and later served as its managing editor. His 1974 doctoral dissertation on Berlioz was the beginning of a what would be the focus of his musical scholarship for many years. The dissertation, with revisions and corrections, was published in 1980 as The Creative Process in the Autograph Musical Documents of Hector Berlioz, c. 1818–1840. In 1987, he published the first complete catalogue of the works of Hector Berlioz, and in 1989 he published Berlioz, his 687-page biography of the composer. He also edited the critical edition of the Roméo et Juliette score for the new edition of the complete works of Berlioz, published by Bärenreiter in 1990.

Holoman's interest in Berlioz and 19th century French orchestral music led to two further books—a comprehensive history of the Société des Concerts du Conservatoire (2004) and a biography of the conductor and champion of Berlioz's music, Charles Munch (2011).
