= Roméo et Juliette (Berlioz) =

1839 choral symphony by Hector Berlioz

- choral symphony by Hector Berlioz
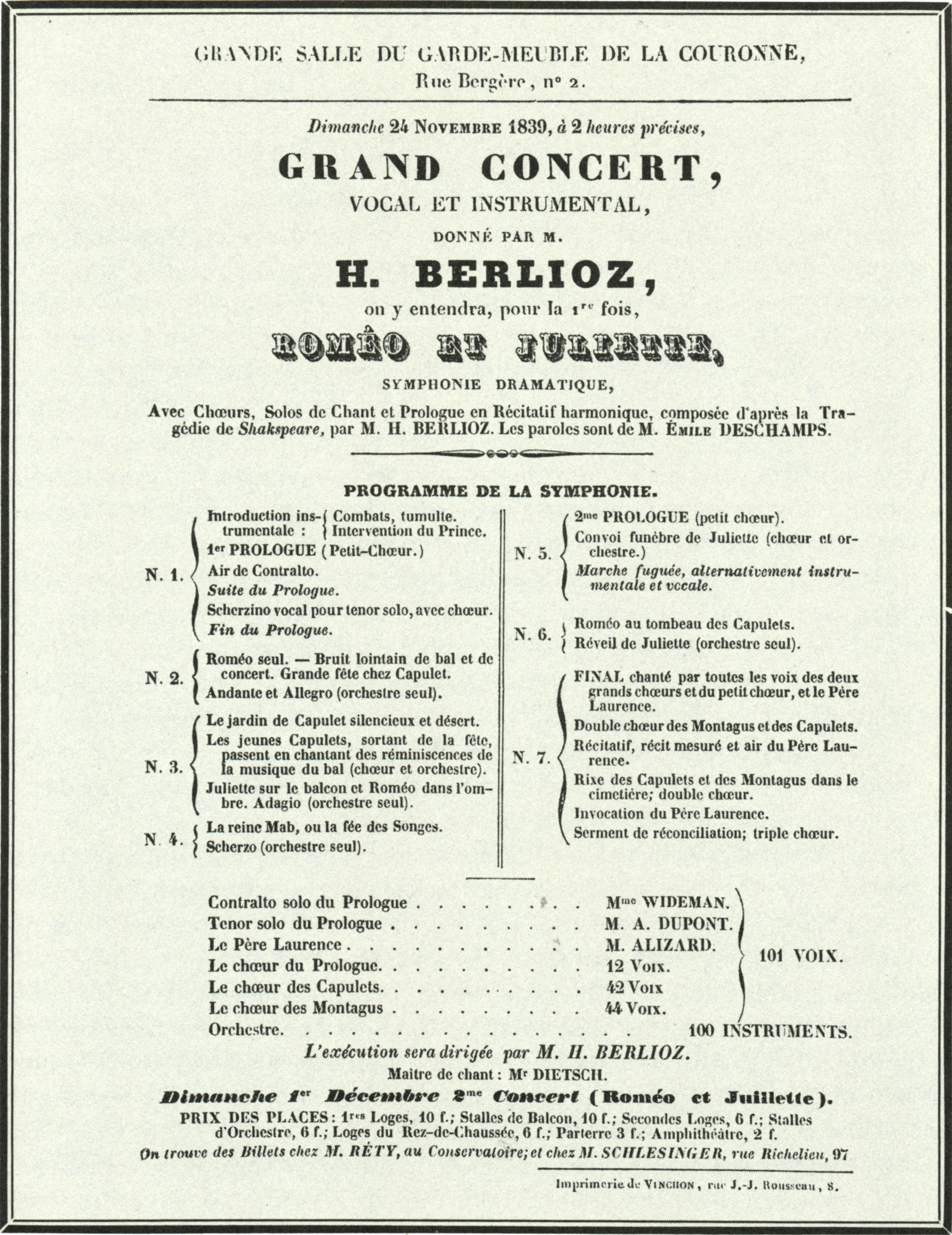
- Handbill advertising the first performance
- Catalogue: H. 79
- Opus: 17
- Text: by Émile Deschamps
- Language: French
- Based on: Shakespeare's Romeo and Juliet
- Performed: 24 November 1839
- Movements: seven, in three parts
- Scoring: 3 soloists; chorus; orchestra

Roméo et Juliette is a seven-movement symphonie dramatique for orchestra and three choruses, with vocal solos, by French composer Hector Berlioz. Émile Deschamps wrote its libretto with Shakespeare's play as his base. The work was completed in 1839 and first performed on 24 November of that year, but it was modified before its first publication, in 1847, and modified again for the 2ème Édition of 1857, today's reference. It bears the catalogue numbers Op. 17 and H. 79. Regarded as one of Berlioz's finest achievements, Roméo et Juliette is also among his most original in form and his most comprehensive and detailed to follow a program. The vocal forces are used in the 1st, 5th and 7th movements. Roméo et Juliette is the second ever symphony by a major composer to incorporate voices after Beethoven's Ninth symphony.

== Composition ==
=== Genesis ===
Initial inspiration came from a performance he witnessed in 1827 of the play Romeo and Juliet (in David Garrick's edited version) at the Odéon Theatre in Paris. The cast included his future wife Harriet Smithson, who also inspired Berlioz's Symphonie fantastique. In his Memoirs, Berlioz describes the electrifying effect of the drama:

... to steep myself in the fiery sun and balmy nights of Italy, to witness the drama of that passion swift as thought, burning as lava, radiantly pure as an angel's glance, imperious, irresistible, the raging vendettas, the desperate kisses, the frantic strife of love and death, was more than I could bear. By the third act, scarcely able to breathe—it was as though an iron hand had gripped me by the heart—I knew that I was lost. I may add that at the time I did not know a word of English; I could only glimpse Shakespeare darkly through the mists of Letourneur's translation; the splendour of the poetry which gives a whole new glowing dimension to his glorious works was lost on me. ... But the power of the acting, especially that of Juliet herself, the rapid flow of the scenes, the play of expression and voice and gesture, told me more and gave me a far richer awareness of the ideas and passions of the original than the words of my pale and garbled translation could do.

The range of feeling and mood as well as poetic and formal invention which Berlioz found in Shakespeare had a strong influence on his music overall. To create a direct musical setting of Shakespeare's work was natural. He had been planning a musical realisation of Romeo and Juliet for a long time before 1838, but other projects ìntervened.

== Performance ==
From composition until the first performance, Berlioz's time was occupied with physical arrangements for the premiere: parts were copied, chorus parts lithographed, and rehearsals got underway. The bass-baritone, Adolphe-Louis Alizard (Friar Lawrence), and the Prologue chorus, all of whom came from the Paris Opéra, were prepared during the intermissions of performances there. There was much anticipation in Paris prior to the first performance. In the rehearsals, Berlioz pioneered the practice of orchestral sectionals, rehearsing the different sections of the orchestra separately to better prepare them for the challenging piece. This was followed by two full orchestra rehearsals to polish up the details.

It was first performed in three concerts conducted by Berlioz at the Paris Conservatoire with an orchestra of 100 instruments and 101 voices on 24 November, 1 December and 15 December 1839, before capacity audiences that comprised much of the Parisian intelligentsia. One notable audience member was Richard Wagner, who would later note the influence of the symphony on his opera Tristan und Isolde. Reactions to the piece were quite varied, as could be expected for a radical work. However, it was widely acknowledged that Berlioz had scored a major triumph in these first performances; a "tour de force such as only my system of sectional rehearsals could have achieved". Berlioz comments: "The work as it was then [in 1839] was performed three times at the Conservatoire under my direction and, each time, appeared to be a genuine success. But I felt at once that much would have to be changed, and I went over it carefully and critically from every point of view." He continued to revise the work, a few instances upon the suggestions of critics, but generally by his own judgement.

A premiere of a later revision (including cuts and changes to the Prologue, Queen Mab Scherzo, and the Finale) was held in Vienna on 2 January 1846, the first performance since 1839 and the first abroad. After hearing a complete performance in Vienna on 26 January 1846, Berlioz took the opportunity to make major revisions before a performance scheduled for the following April in Prague. He accepted advice from several confidants and advisers, rewriting the coda of the Queen Mab Scherzo, shortening Friar Laurence's narrative at the end, deleting a lengthy second Prologue at the beginning of the second half, and introducing musical foreshadowing in the first prologue. The full score was not published until 1847.

Reflecting on the first performances, Berlioz commented in his memoirs:

The work is enormously difficult to perform. It poses problems of every kind, problems inherent in the form and in the style and only to be solved by long and patient rehearsal, impeccably directed. To be well done, it needs first-rate performers—players, singers, conductor—intent on preparing it with as much care as a new opera is prepared in a good opera house, in fact almost as if it were to be performed by heart.

== Instrumentation ==
The score calls for:

- piccolo, 2 flutes, 2 oboes (one doubling cor anglais), 2 clarinets, 4 bassoons
- 4 horns, 2 cornets, 2 trumpets, 3 trombones, bass tuba
- 2 pairs of timpani, 2 Tambourines, 2 Triangles, bass drum, cymbals, crotales
- 2 harps and strings
- contralto, tenor, bass

== Music ==
Structurally and musically, Roméo et Juliette is most indebted to Beethoven's 9th symphony – not just due to the use of soloists and choir, but in factors such as the weight of the vocal contribution being in the finale, and also in aspects of the orchestration such as the theme of the trombone recitative at the Introduction. The roles of Roméo and Juliette are represented by the orchestra, and the narrative aspects by the voices. Berlioz's reasoning follows:

If, in the famous garden and cemetery scenes, the dialogue of the two lovers, Juliet's asides, and Romeo's passionate outbursts are not sung, if the duets of love and despair are given to the orchestra, the reasons for this are numerous and easy to understand. First, and this reason alone would be sufficient, it is a symphony and not an opera. Second, since duets of this nature have been treated vocally a thousand times by the greatest masters, it was wise as well as unusual to attempt another means of expression.

The vocal forces are used sparingly throughout, until they are fully deployed in the finale. The exceptional virtuosity deployed in the orchestral writing seems particularly appropriate for the dedicatee of the work, Paganini himself, who was never able to hear it, much to Berlioz's regret. Further examples of Berlioz's inventiveness are shown in the use of thematic links throughout the piece, somewhat laying the ground for the Wagnerian leitmotif, for example, the last solo notes of the oboe that follow Juliet's suicide echo a phrase from the earlier funeral procession, when she was thought to be dead. Berlioz signed and dated his autograph on 8 September 1839. The final score was dedicated to Paganini.

The stylistic links of the work with Beethoven before (and Wagner after) could not be stronger. From Beethoven, Berlioz learned the very notion of programmatic music. He saw in the Pastoral symphony how music might be depictive without being naïve, in the symphonic scherzi how the delicate Queen Mab might best be evoked, and in the 9th symphony how effective a choral finale could be. He sensed Beethoven's flexibility with regard to number of movements and the performing force.

== Influence ==
From Roméo et Juliette Wagner absorbed much about the ideals of dramatic music; the work can be considered a major influence on his Tristan und Isolde. When Wagner first heard the work in 1839, he said it made him feel like a schoolboy at Berlioz's side. Roméo et Juliette was also the work of Berlioz that Wagner knew best. Indeed, their second and last meeting was on the occasion of a performance of the work in London in 1855. Wagner learned something of melodic flexibility and perhaps even a mastery of the orchestral force from Berlioz. Moreover, in 1860, he sent Berlioz the published full score of Tristan und Isolde, inscribed:

Au grand et cher auteur de

Roméo et Juliette
L'auteur reconnaissant de

Tristan et Isolde.

Translation:

To the great and dear author of

Romeo and Juliet
from the grateful author of

Tristan and Isolde.

Beyond the influence on Wagner's music drama, the piece pushed the limits of the contemporary orchestra's capabilities, in terms of colour, programmatic scope, and individual virtuosity. While this applies to much of Berlioz's music, it is even more true for Roméo et Juliette, written at the height of his powers and ambition. Its vivid scene-setting surpasses many operas, which constitutes an enormous success on Berlioz's part. Franz Liszt also recognised the significance of Berlioz as a progressive composer, and championed his music.

== Structure ==
Part I

1. Introduction: Combats (Combat) – Tumulte (Tumult)
  Intervention du prince (Intervention of the prince)
  Prologue – Strophes – Scherzetto

Part II

Le jardin de Capulet, silencieux et désert
Chicago Symphony Orchestra, conducted by Carlo Maria Giulini

2. Roméo seul (Romeo alone) – Tristesse (Sadness)
  Bruits lointains de concert et de bal (Distant sounds from the concert and the ball)
  Grande fête chez Capulet (Great banquet at the Capulets)
3. Scène d'amour (Love scene) – Nuit serène (Serene night)
  Le jardin de Capulet silencieux et déserte (The Capulets' garden silent and deserted)
  Les jeunes Capulets sortant de la fête en chantant des réminiscences de la musique du bal (The young Capulets leaving the banquet singing snatches of music from the ball)
4. Scherzo: La reine Mab, reine des songes (Queen Mab, the queen of dreams – the Queen Mab Scherzo)

Part III

5. Convoi funèbre de Juliette (Funeral cortège for the young Juliet): "Jetez des fleurs pour la vierge expirée" ("Throw flowers for the dead virgin")
6. Roméo au tombeau des Capulets (Romeo at the tomb of the Capulets)
  Invocation: Réveil de Juliette (Juliet awakes) – Joie délirante, désespoir (Delirious joy, despair)
  Dernières angoisses et mort des deux amants (Last throes and death of the two lovers)
7. Finale:
  La foule accourt au cimetière (The crowd rushes to the graveyard)
  Des Capulets et des Montagus (Fight between the Capulets and Montagues)
  Récitatif et Air du Père Laurence (Friar Lawrence's recitative and aria)
  Aria: "Pauvres enfants que je pleure" ("Poor children for whom I weep")
  Serment de réconciliation (Oath of reconciliation)
  Oath: "Jurez donc par l'auguste symbole" ("Swear by the revered symbol")

== Recordings ==
=== Complete ===
- Roméo et Juliette: Gladys Swarthout, John Garris, Nicola Moscona. Arturo Toscanini cond., NBC Symphony Orchestra. 2 CDs, ADD, RCA Records. Recorded 1947.
- Roméo et Juliette: Margaret Roggero, Leslie Chabay, Yi-Kwei Sze. Charles Munch cond., Boston Symphony Orchestra, Harvard Glee Club and Radcliffe Choral Society. RCA Records Victor LP LM 6011; CD reissue RCA/BMG GD 60681. Recorded Boston, 22–23 February 1953.
- Roméo et Juliette: Irma Kolassi, Joseph Peyron, Lucien Lovano. Charles Munch cond., Orchestre National et Choœurs de la RTF. 2 CDs, Cascavelle. Live recording, Paris, 25 June 1953.
- Roméo et Juliette: Rosalind Elias, Cesare Valletti, Giorgio Tozzi. Boston Symphony Orchestra, New England Conservatory Chorus. RCA Records Victor LP LD 6098; CD reissue RCA/BMG 74321 341682. Recorded Boston, 23–24 April 1961.
- Roméo et Juliette: Regina Resnik, André Turp, David Ward. Pierre Monteux cond., London Symphony Orchestra and Chorus. Westminster LP XWN2233; CD reissues Millennium Classics MCAD-29805, DG Westminster 471 2422. Recorded Walthamstow Town Hall, 18–21 June 1962.
- Roméo et Juliette: Patricia Kern, Robert Tear, John Shirley-Quirk. Sir Colin Davis cond., London Symphony Orchestra, John Alldis Choir, Philips LP SAL3695-96, CD reissue 416 962.2. Recorded Wembley Town Hall, 24, 27–28 February, 13–14 April 1968.
- Roméo et Juliette: Christa Ludwig, Michel Sénéchal, Nicolai Ghiaurov. Lorin Maazel cond. ORTF Choir, Vienna Philharmonic Orchestra, Decca Records SET570-71. Recorded 11–15 December 1972, Sofiensaal, Vienna.
- Roméo et Juliette: Julia Hamari, Jean Dupouy, José van Dam. Seiji Ozawa, cond., Boston Symphony Orchestra, New England Conservatory Chorus. 2 CDs. Deutsche Grammophon. Recorded Boston, October 1975.
- Roméo et Juliette: Brigitte Fassbaender, Nicolai Gedda, John Shirley-Quirk. Lamberto Gardelli, cond., Austrian Radio Symphony Orchestra and Chorus. Orfeo. Recorded 18–25 February 1983, Musikvereinssaal.
- Roméo et Juliette: Olga Borodina, Thomas Moser, Alastair Miles. Colin Davis cond., Wiener Philharmoniker, Bavarian Radio Chorus. 2 CDs, DDD, Philips Classics Records, 1 September 1993.
- Roméo et Juliette: Catherine Robbin, Jean-Paul Fouchécourt, Gilles Cachemaille. John Eliot Gardiner cond., Orchestre Révolutionnaire et Romantique, Monteverdi Choir. 2 CDs, DDD, Philips/PolyGram, 14 April 1998.
- Roméo et Juliette: Jessye Norman, John Aler, Simon Estes. Riccardo Muti cond., Philadelphia Orchestra, Westminster Choir, New Philharmonia Orchestra. 2 CDs, DDD, EMI Classics, 11 August 1998.
- Roméo et Juliette: Daniela Barcellona, Kenneth Tarver, Orlin Anastassov. Colin Davis cond., London Symphony Orchestra. 2 CDs, DDD, LSO Live, 1 January 2000. Cat. no: LSO0003, UPC: 822231100324.
- Roméo et Juliette: Melanie Diener, Kenneth Tarver, Denis Sedov. Pierre Boulez cond., Cleveland Orchestra and Chorus. 2 CDs, DDD, Deutsche Grammophon, 14 October 2003.
- Roméo et Juliette: Olga Borodina, Kenneth Tarver, Evgeny Nikitin. Valery Gergiev cond., London Symphony Orchestra and Chorus, Guildhall School Singers. 2 CDs, DDD, LSO Live, November 2013. UPC: 822231176220.
- Roméo et Juliette: Michèle Losier, Samuel Boden, David Soar. Andrew Davis, cond., BBC Symphony Orchestra, BBC Symphony Chorus. 2 CDs, DDD, Chandos. Recorded 2015.
- Roméo et Juliette, Joyce DiDonato, Cyrille Dubois, Christopher Maltman, Choeur de l'OnR, Orchestre philarmonique de Strasbourg, conducted by John Nelson. 2 CD Warner classics 2023. Choc de Classica

=== Excerpts ===
- Roméo et Juliette: André Cluytens, Orchestre du Théâtre National de l'Opéra. CD, Testament, September 1956. Cat. no: SBT1234 .
- Roméo et Juliette: Lorin Maazel cond., Berlin Philharmonic Orchestra, Deutsche Grammophone, 1957
- Roméo et Juliette: Leonard Bernstein cond., New York Philharmonic. 2 CDs, ADD, Sony, 1963.
- Roméo et Juliette: Carlo Maria Giulini cond., Chicago Symphony Orchestra. 2 CDs, ADD, EMI Classics/Angel, 1969.
- Roméo et Juliette: Yoav Talmi cond., San Diego Symphony Orchestra, San Diego Master Chorale. CD, DDD, Naxos, 19–20 November 1994. Cat. no: 8.553195.

=== DVD ===
- Roméo et Juliette: Hanna Schwarz, Philip Langridge, Peter Meven. Colin Davis cond., Bavarian Radio Symphony Orchestra. DVD, Arthaus Musik, 21 March 2006. Cat. no: 102017
