= Sergei Yuferov =

Ukrainian composer

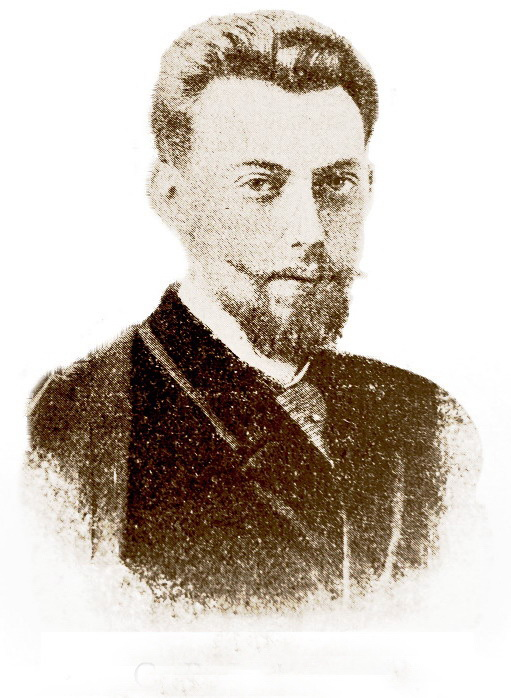
Sergei Yuferov

Sergei Vladimirovich Yuferov (Russian: Сергей Владимирович Юферов; also Sergei Iuferov, Serge Youferoff, Sergej Wladimirowich Juferow; born 1865 in Odessa) was a Russian (Ukrainian) composer and pianist.

Yuferov studied with Alexander Glazunov and Nikolai Klenovsky (Николай Семёнович Кленовский) (1857–1915) in Saint Petersburg, and with Nikolai Hubert (Николай Альбертович Губерт) (1840–1888) and Herman Laroche in Moscow.

Yuferov was active in Switzerland in 1906. Yuferov died in 1927 at the age of 61 or 62.

== Selected works ==
Opera

- Myrrha (Мирра), Opera in 4 acts, Op. 21 (1891); libretto by the composer
- Yolande (Иоланда), Opera in 2 acts, Op. 22 (1893); libretto by Prince Dm. Goletsin
- Antoine et Cléopatre (Антоний и Клеопатра), Opera in 4 acts with prologue, Op. 24 (1899–1900); libretto by the composer after the play by William Shakespeare

Orchestral

- Marche funèbre, Op. 7 No. 4; original version for piano solo
- Moussia s'amuse, Suite de scènes d'enfant, Op. 18; also for piano solo
- Scènes et danses, Op. 27
- Rêverie orientale, Fantaisie, Op. 28 No. 1 (published 1901)
- Barcarolle "Sur l'eau", Op. 28 No. 2
- Symphoniette in C major, Op. 29 (published 1901)
- Fantaisie algérienne (Алжирская фантазия), Op. 40; also for piano solo
- Fantaisie funèbre „à la mémoire d'un héros de 1905“, Op. 42
- Élégie, Adagio symphonique, Op. 48
- Suite de ballet (Балетная сюита), Op. 49

Concertante

- Fantaisie de concert in B♭ minor for violin and orchestra, Op. 34
- 2 Pièces, Op. 43 (1910)

1. Chant du Cygne in E minor for cello and orchestra
2. Mélancolie in D minor for viola and orchestra

Chamber music

- 3 Romances (Три романса) for violin and piano, Op. 36

1. Ballade
2. Berceuse
3. Romance

- Suite for 2 violins, viola, cello, harmonium and piano, Op. 44

1. Introduction
2. Petite valse
3. Aveu
4. Paraphrase
5. Arabesque
6. Nocturne
7. Sérénade

- Piano Trio in C minor, Op. 52 (published 1913)

Piano

- 6 Arabesques (Арабески), Op. 1 (published c.1885)

1. Improvisation
2. Romance
3. Élégie in F major
4. Intermezzo
5. Rêverie
6. Fileuse

- Théâtre des marionettes (Театр марионеток), Suite fantastique, Op. 2

1. Introduction
2. Arlequin
3. Rêve
4. Pezzo umoristico
5. Espièglerie
6. Valse clochante
7. Polichinelle
8. La ronde de nuit
9. Amour de guignol
10. Marche des marionettes

- 3 Nouvellettes (Новелетты), Op. 3

1. in C major
2. in E major
3. in D major

- Les soupirs, Nouvelle, Op. 7

1. Une nuit à Sorrento (Nocturne)
2. Intermezzo
3. Une nuit à Venise (Nocturne)
4. Marche funèbre; also orchestrated

- 3 Nouvelles Nouvellettes, Op. 9

1. in E♭ major
2. in D major
3. in G minor

- Entre petits et grands amis, 6 Album Leaves (Листки из альбома), Op. 10

1. Boite à musique
2. Aveu
3. Mazurca
4. Petite valse
5. Question et réponse
6. Mélodie

- En famille, 6 Album Leaves (Листки из альбома), Op. 12

1. Feuille d'album
2. Petite étude
3. Impatience
4. Charmeuse
5. Un conte
6. Caprice

- Mazurca-fantaisie, Op. 14
- Moussia s'amuse, Suite de scènes d'enfant, Op. 18; also orchestrated
- 2 Impromptus, Op. 20

1. Rêverie
2. Valse

- Adoration des pasteurs, Op. 26
- Fantaisie-ballade in D minor, Op. 37
- 6 Arabesques nouvelles, Op. 39 (published 1909)

1. Chant triste
2. Rêverie douloureuse
3. Flânerie
4. Bagatelle
5. Après l'orage
6. Intimité

- Fantaisie algérienne (Алжирская фантазия), Op. 40; also orchestrated
- Sonate-fantaisie in C minor, Op. 46 (published 1910)
- 6 Pièces pour bébé, Op. 50

1. Rondo in G major
2. Marche in C major
3. Dumka in A minor
4. Canzonetta in C major
5. Scherzo in G major
6. Nocturne in D minor

Vocal

- 6 Romances (Шесть романсов) for voice and piano, Op. 3

1. На ложѣ дѣвичьемъ
2. Жду я тревогой объятъ
3. То было раннею весной; also for voice, violin and piano
4. Шепотъ робкое дыханье
5. Съ ружьемъ за плечами; also for voice and orchestra
6. Каждый день въ саду гарема

- 5 Romances et un duo (Пять романсов и дуэтъ) for voice and piano, Op. 4

1. Спишь ты
2. Опять я слышу эти свуки
3. Тихо все
4. Чолнъ плыветъ; words by Apollon Maykov; also for voice and orchestra
5. Баркаролла; also for voice and orchestra
6. Лилія (дуэтъ)

- 3 Romances sur paroles de Fr. Coppée for voice and piano, Op. 6; words by François Coppée

1. Вы какъ хотите и какъ знайте (Vous aurez beau faire)
2. Какъ только взгляну я на розу (Quand vous me montrez une rose)
3. Сѣвера я видѣлъ чудо дитя (Quand de la divine enfant)

- 3 Romances sur paroles de Fr. Coppée for voice and piano, Op. 8; words by François Coppée

1. Часовню знаю я (Je sais une chapelle)
2. Спросилъ я эхо (J'ai cherché dans la solitude)
3. Уже давно (Dans le faubourg)

- 3 Romances (Три Романсы) for voice and piano or orchestra, Op. 11

1. Бѣжитъ за волною
2. Плѣнившись розой соловей
3. Темнота и туманъ

- 5 Romances et un duo (Пять романсов и дуэтъ) for voice and piano, Op. 13

1. Еврейская мелодія; also for voice and orchestra
2. Не весна тогда; also for voice and orchestra
3. Спи дитя, усни; also for voice and orchestra
4. Погубили меня твои чорны глаза
5. Ты страдаешь опять
6. Тучи набѣжали (дуэтъ)

- 5 Romances et un duo (Пять романсов и дуэтъ) for voice and piano, Op. 15

1. Ты не спрашивай
2. Голубенькій, чистый; also for voice and orchestra
3. Запахъ розы и жасмина
4. Изъ моей великой скорби
5. Птички ласточки летите
6. Намъ звѣзды кропкія сіяли (дуэтъ)

- 3 Romances (Три Романсы) for voice and piano, Op. 16

1. Гаснетъ день; also for voice and orchestra
2. Листья осенніе
3. Милый другъ мой не вѣрь; also for voice and orchestra

- 3 Romances (Три Романсы) for voice and piano, Op. 17

1. Задремали волны; also for voice and orchestra
2. Распустилась черемуха
3. На балконѣ цвѣтущей весною

- 3 Romances (Три Романсы) for voice and piano or orchestra, Op. 19

1. О, если правда что въ ночи
2. Я здѣсь Инезилья
3. И лугъ и нива

- 5 Romances (Пять романсов) for voice and piano or orchestra, Op. 25

1. Весною
2. Былъ старый король
3. Лунная ночь
4. Элегія
5. Бѣлая равнина

- 6 Romances (Шесть романсов) for voice and piano or orchestra, Op. 30

1. Когда безъ страсти
2. Приди ко мнѣ
3. Шепотъ, робкое дыханье
4. Я долго стоялъ неподвижно
5. Узникъ
6. Коль любить такъ безъ разсудка

- 5 Romances et un duo (Пять романсов и дуэтъ) for voice and piano, Op. 32; Nos. 1–5 also for voice and orchestra

1. Ты помнишь ли Марія
2. Дитя, мои пѣсни
3. Слѣпой нищій
4. Будутъ мнѣ грезиться
5. Серенада
6. Привѣтъ веснѣ (дуэтъ)

- 6 Romances (Шесть романсов) for voice and piano, Op. 33; Nos. 1–5 also for voice and orchestra

1. Въ туманѣ смутлыхъ дней
2. Въ сумракъ безмолвной лагуны
3. Грезы
4. Уснула жизнь вокругъ
5. Мнѣ жаль всего
6. Новаго хоть что нибудь (баллада-шутка)

- 3 Romances (Три Романсы) for voice and piano or orchestra, Op. 47

1. Розы
2. Не говорите мнѣ
3. Прощаюсь съ грустными, но милыми мнѣ снами

- 6 Poésies de Lermontoff for voice and piano or orchestra, Op. 51; words by Mikhail Lermontov

1. Въ морѣ царевичъ купаетъ коня (Un prince baigne en la mer son coursier; Ritt seinen Renner ein Prinz in das Meer)
2. Не плачь, не плачь мое дитя (Ne pleure pas ma chère enfant; Nicht weinen, o nicht weinen, Kind)
3. Въ полдневный жаръ (Sous le soleil au Dagestan sauvage; Im öden Dagestan, zur Mittagsstunde)
4. Нѣтъ! не тебя я такъ пылко люблю (Non, ce n'est point ta beautéque j'amais; Nein, du bist's nicht, die ich lieb)
5. Ты помнишь ли (Te souvient-il du jour si triste; Gedenk des trauervollen Tages)
6. Выхожу одинъ я на дорогу (Je chemine seul par la nuit sombre; Einsam wandre ich in Abendschweigen)

- 7 Poésies dramatiques for voice and piano or orchestra, Op. 54

1. Fleurs de vallon (Eine einsame Blume)
2. Nocturne (Nachtstück)
3. Sans toi (Was wäre)
4. Il passa (Er ging vorbei)
5. L'infidèle (Der Ungetreue)
6. Rondel de l'adieu (Scheiden)
7. Au rouet (Am Spinnrad)

- Essais de musique réligieuse for voice and harmonium, Op. 56

Choral

- Отче нашъ for chorus a cappella, Op. 23
- Ilya Muromets (Илья Муромец, Былина-кантата), Bylina Cantata for soloists, chorus and orchestra, Op. 31
- Очистимъ ягаду for chorus a cappella, Op. 38 No. 1
- Гребцы for chorus a cappella, Op. 38 No. 2

== Sources ==
- Энциклопедии & Словари (in Russian)
- Биография: Юферов Сергей Владимирович (in Russian)
