= Feuilles d'album, S.165 (Liszt) =

1841 composition for piano by Franz Liszt

Feuilles d'album, S.165, (English: Album Leaves) is a solo piano piece in A♭ major by Hungarian composer and virtuoso pianist Franz Liszt, composed in 1841 and published in 1844 by Schott frères. It is dedicated to his friend, Gustave Du Bousquet. A performance takes about 2 1/2 minutes.
