= Overtures by Hector Berlioz =

Instrumental works

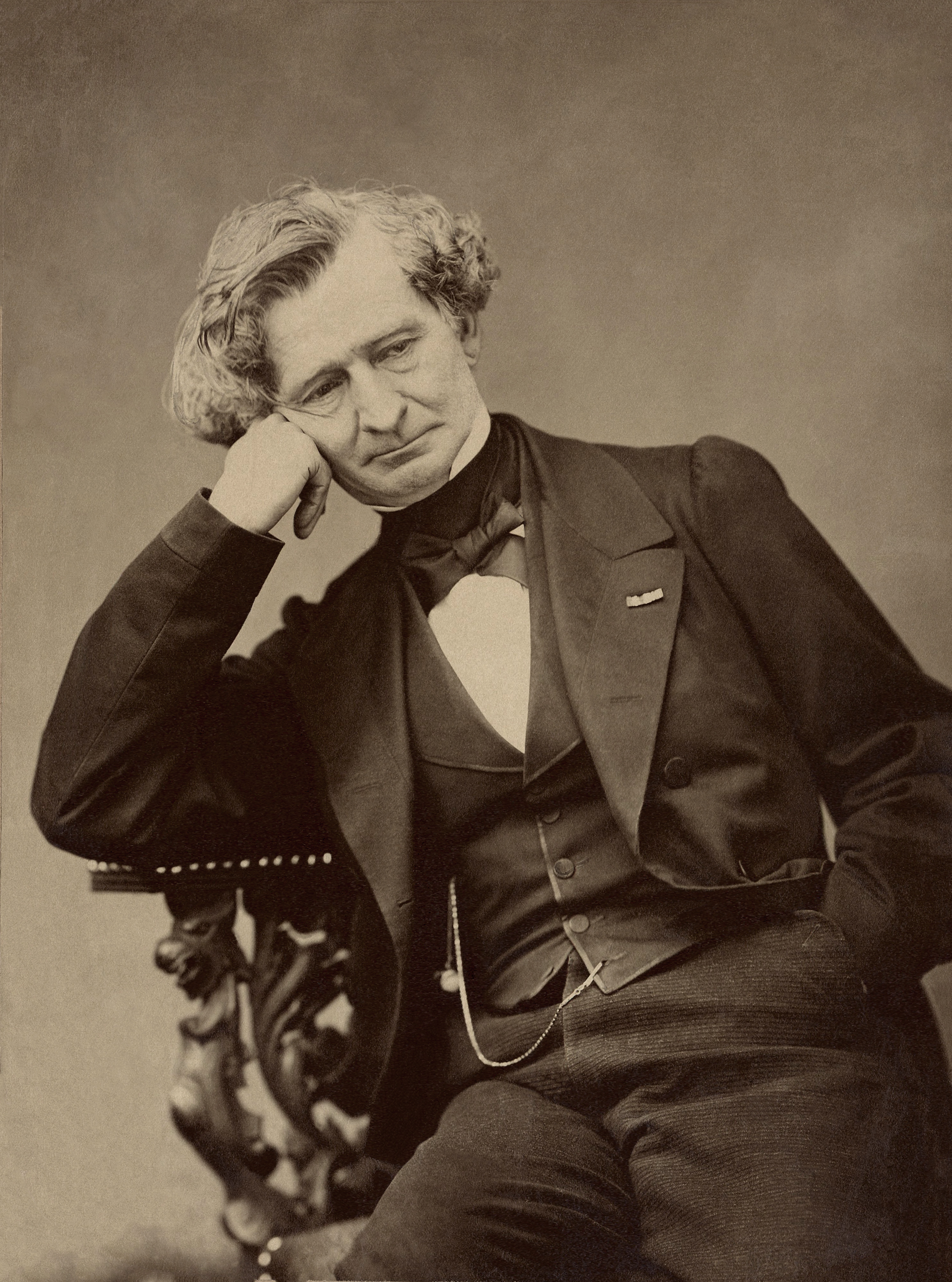
Hector Berlioz photographed by Pierre Petit (1863).

French composer Hector Berlioz wrote a number of "overtures", many of which have become popular concert works. They include true overtures, intended to introduce operas, but also independent concert overtures that are in effect the first orchestral tone poems.

== Overtures ==
=== Les francs-juges ===
Les francs-juges, Op. 3. Composed 1826. The overture to Berlioz's first attempt at opera, which was never staged. The overture was first performed in the concert hall of the Paris Conservatoire as part of an all Berlioz concert on 26 May 1828. In his study on the composer, Jacques Barzun describes the work as "a genuine tour de force for a young dramatic musician working without knowledge of Beethoven."

The instrumentation is two flutes doubling piccolo, two oboes, two clarinets in C, two bassoons, contrabassoon, four horns (in E♭ and D), three trumpets (two in E and one in E♭), three trombones, two ophicleides, percussion (timpani, bass drum and cymbals) and strings.

=== Waverley ===
Waverley: grande ouverture (Waverley: Grand Overture), Op. 1. A concert overture composed in 1828. It was first performed at the Paris Conservatoire on 26 May 1828. Berlioz took his inspiration from Sir Walter Scott's Waverley novels.

The instrumentation is two flutes (second doubling piccolo), two oboes, two clarinets (one in C and one in A), four bassoons, four horns in D, three trumpets (one in D and two in A), three trombones, ophicleide, timpani and strings.

=== Le roi Lear ===
Le roi Lear (King Lear), Op. 4. Composed in Nice in 1831 during Berlioz's journey back to France after his stay in Italy (due to winning the Prix de Rome). The overture is based on Shakespeare's King Lear, a recent discovery for the composer whose love of the dramatist is evident in many other of his works. It was first performed at the Paris Conservatoire on 22 December 1833.

The instrumentation is two flutes (second doubling piccolo), two oboes, two clarinets in C, two bassoons, four horns (in E♭ and C), two trumpets in C, three trombones, ophicleide, timpani and strings. In the publication of the overture by Breitkopf and Härtel, the ophicleide is exchanged for a tuba on the basis that French and German orchestras no longer owned ophicleides. This editorial decision is upheld in many modern performances.

=== Rob Roy ===
Intrata di Rob Roy Macgregor (Rob Roy Overture). Composed in 1831 and first performed at the Paris Conservatoire on 14 April 1833. The overture was inspired by Sir Walter Scott's novel Rob Roy. Berlioz was never happy with the piece, regarding it as "long and diffuse", and withdrew it after the premiere. He would show drafts of it to Felix Mendelssohn when they met in Rome which he regretted. A plaintive melody for cor anglais would later find prominent use for the solo viola in Harold en Italie.

The instrumentation is two flutes (second doubling piccolo), two oboes, English horn, two clarinets in A, two bassoons, four horns (in D and G), three trumpets (one in D and two in A), three trombones, timpani, harp and strings.

=== Benvenuto Cellini ===
Overture to the opera of the same name, composed in 1838.

The instrumentation is two flutes, two oboes, two clarinets in C, four bassoons, four horns (in G, E and D), four trumpets (in G, E and D), two cornets in A, three trombones, ophicleide, percussion (3 timpani players, cymbals, triangle, bass drum) and strings.

=== Le carnaval romain ===
Roman Carnival Overture, Op. 9
Performed by the Skidmore College Orchestra

Le carnaval romain, ouverture pour orchestre (Roman Carnival Overture), Op. 9. Composed in 1843 and first performed at the Salle Herz, Paris, on 3 February 1844. A stand-alone overture intended for concert performance, made up of material and themes from Berlioz's opera Benvenuto Cellini, including some music from the opera's carnival scene – hence the overture's title. It is scored for large orchestra, is in the key of A major, and features a prominent and famous solo for the cor anglais.

=== Le corsaire ===
Le corsaire (The Corsair), Op. 21. Overture composed while Berlioz was on holiday in Nice in August 1844. It was first performed under the title La tour de Nice (The Tower of Nice) on 19 January 1845. It was then renamed Le corsaire rouge (after James Fenimore Cooper's novel The Red Rover) and finally Le corsaire (suggesting Byron's poem The Corsair).

The instrumentation is two flutes, two oboes, two clarinets in C, four horns (in C and F), two bassoons, two trumpets in C, two cornets in B♭, three trombones, ophicleide, timpani and strings.

=== La fuite en Égypte ===
Overture to La fuite en Égypte (The Flight into Egypt). Together with two choral pieces, L'adieu des bergers and Le repos de la sainte famille, this made up a short work depicting Jesus and his family fleeing to Egypt to escape persecution by King Herod. This was published in 1852 but wound up as the core of another, larger work: the oratorio L'enfance du Christ.

=== Béatrice et Bénédict ===
Béatrice et Bénédict. Overture to the opera of the same name, composed in 1862.

=== Les Troyens à Carthage ===
Berlioz's epic opera Les Troyens was never performed complete during his lifetime. In an attempt to have the opera staged by the Théâtre Lyrique in 1863, he split it into two parts, with acts 1 and 2 becoming La prise de Troie (The Capture of Troy) and acts 3–5 Les Troyens à Carthage (The Trojans at Carthage). Only the latter was accepted and Berlioz wrote an orchestral prologue to introduce this version evoking the tragic fate of Troy.

== Recordings ==
The individual overtures have been recorded many times. This is a partial list of collections exclusively devoted to Berlioz's overtures:

- Overtures: Les francs-juges, Waverley, Le roi Lear, Le carnaval romain, Béatrice et Bénédict, Le corsaire, Benvenuto Cellini, Rob Roy. London Philharmonic Orchestra, conducted by Adrian Boult. Recorded 28–29 August 1956: LPs Westminster WST 14008 and WST 14009 reissued on CD, First Hand Remasters FHR07, 2010
- Overtures: Les francs-juges, Waverley, Le roi Lear, Le carnaval romain, Béatrice et Bénédict, Le corsaire, Benvenuto Cellini. Staatskapelle Dresden, conducted by Sir Colin Davis. CD, RCA, 1998
- Overtures: La damnation de Faust, Op. 24 (excerpts): Part I Scene 3: Hungarian March/Rakoczy March & Part II Scene 7: Ballet des syphes; Roman Carnival Overture, Op. 9; Romeo et Juliette, Op. 17 – Love Scene; Le roi Lear; Benvenuto Cellini, Op. 23 – Overture; Le corsaire, Overture, Op. 21. Polish State Philharmonic Orchestra, Katowice, Kenneth Jean cond. CD, DDD, TT: 68 minutes, Naxos. Cat. no. No: 8.550231, barcode 0730099523127
- Overtures: Benvenuto Cellini, Op. 23; Waverley, Op. 1; Beatrice and Benedict; King Lear, Op. 4; Roman Carnival Overture, Op. 9; Rob Roy; Le Corsaire, Op. 21. San Diego Symphony, Yoav Talmi. CD, DDD, TT: 75 minutes, Naxos. Cat. no. 8.550999, barcode 0730099599924
- Overtures: Le Carnaval Romain, Beatrice et Benedict, Le corsaire, Benevenuto Cellini, Les Troyens: Royal Hunt and Storm, Romeo et Juliette: Queen Mab Scherzo, and Camille Saint-Saëns's Omphale's Spinning Wheel, Boston Symphony Orchestra conducted by Charles Munch. CD, RCA
