= Le Chant des chemins de fer =

1846 cantata by Hector Berlioz

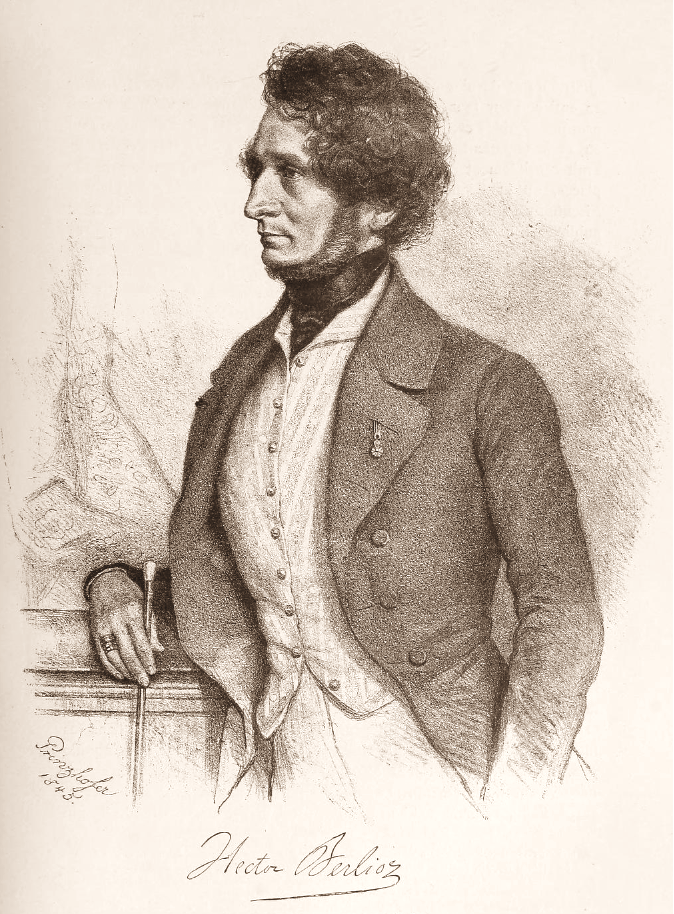
Hector Berlioz by August Prinzhofer, 1845

Le Chant des chemins de fer (The Song of the Railways) is a cantata in B major by Hector Berlioz for tenor solo, choir and orchestra composed in June 1846 on lyrics by Jules Janin and premiered 14 June 1846 for the inauguration of the Gare de Lille.

== Circumstances of the composition ==
The work was commissioned by the city of Lille. According to his correspondence, Berlioz composed it in a hurry in three nights, interrupting the writing of La Damnation de Faust.

Berlioz, who travelled on the inaugural train, spent eight days in Lille and conducted Le Chant des chemins de fer and at the same time the finale of his Grande symphonie funèbre et triomphale leading a military orchestra of 150 wind instrumentalists and singers from the Conservatoire de Lille.

Berlioz had asked that the final chord be punctuated by a cannonade that could not take place.

== Lyrics ==
The text is by Jules Janin, a friend of Berlioz and Saint-Simonian. Berlioz supposedly had been enthusiastic at that time about Saint-Simonianism.

== Music ==
The music is nervous and vigorous, the orchestration bouncing. The cantata also includes a prayer, andante religioso.

The whole may sound grandiloquent and heavy. The interpretation of the three verses and chorus takes about 9 minutes.

== Legacy ==
The work was incorporated with other compositions under Opus 19 No. 3, Album leaf. It is rarely played. One of the performances is that of the symphony orchestra of the SNCF with the choirs of the Oratory on the occasion of a Congress of the "Association internationale du congrès des chemins de fer" (AICCF) in 1966.

The work was performed for the opening ceremony of Lille 2004 "European Capital of Culture".
