= Tristia (Berlioz) =

1852 musical work by Hector Berlioz

- Choral-symphonic music by Hector Berlioz
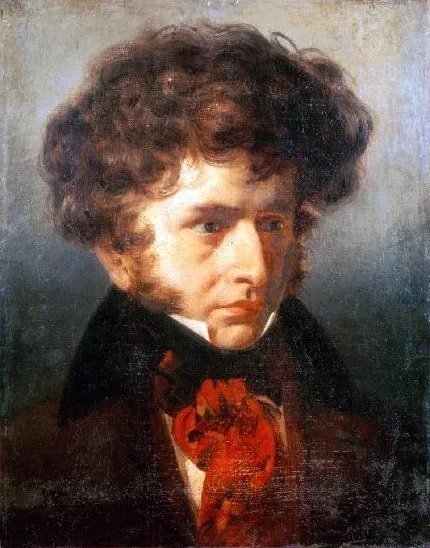
- Berlioz portrayed in 1832
- Opus: 18
- Text: poetry by Thomas Moore and Ernest Legouvé
- Language: French
- Composed: 1832; 1844; 1848
- Published: 1852
- Movements: three
- Scoring: narrator; tenor; baritone; chorus; orchestra; piano

Tristia, Op. 18, is a musical work consisting of three short pieces for chorus and orchestra by the French composer Hector Berlioz. Apart from its title, it has nothing to do with the collection of Latin poems by Ovid (the word tristia in Latin means 'sad things'). The individual works were composed at different times and published together in 1852. Berlioz associated them in his mind with Shakespeare's Hamlet, one of his favourite plays. They were never performed during the composer's lifetime.

== Details of the work ==
The three movements are:

1. Méditation religieuse (Religious Meditation) A setting of a poem by Thomas Moore (translated into French by Louise Belloc) for six-part chorus and small orchestra. It was composed during Berlioz's stay in Rome in 1831.
2. La mort d’Ophélie (The death of Ophelia) A setting of a ballade by Ernest Legouvé, based on Gertrude's description of Ophelia's drowning in Act IV of Hamlet. It was originally composed for solo voice and piano in 1842 but in 1848 Berlioz revised it for female choir and orchestra.
3. Marche funèbre pour la dernière scène d'Hamlet (Funeral March for the final scene of Hamlet). The score bears the date September 22, 1848 on it, but it was probably composed in late 1844 and revised on this date. It was composed for a stage performance of Hamlet at the Odéon Theatre that never took place. Berlioz never heard the work. It is the most famous of the three pieces.
