= Les Francs-juges =

Unfinished opera by Hector Berlioz

- Unfinished opera by Hector Berlioz
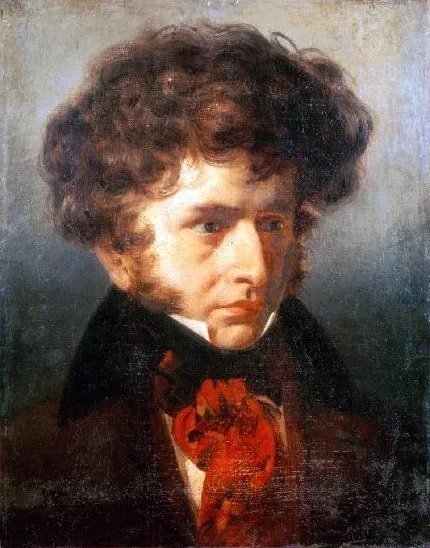
- Berlioz in 1832, portrayed by Émile Signol
- Librettist: Humbert Ferrand
- Language: French

Les Francs-juges (translated as The Free Judges or The Judges of the Secret Court) is the title of an unfinished opera by the French composer Hector Berlioz written to a libretto by his friend Humbert Ferrand in 1826. Berlioz abandoned the incomplete composition and destroyed most of the music. He retained the overture, which has become a popular concert item, and used some other musical material in later compositions.

== Opera ==
Ferrand was a law student with a love of poetry who became a lifelong friend of Berlioz. He had already written the words to a cantata for the composer, La Révolution grecque in 1825. Now Ferrand gratified Berlioz's eagerness to write his first opera by providing him with a three-act libretto, Les Francs-juges. The work is set in Mediaeval Germany and the title literally means "The Free Judges", referring to the secret Vehmic trials held in the region during the late Middle Ages. The plot, with its stormy passions and theme of rescue from oppression, offered Berlioz the opportunity to compose a work in the style of the French Revolutionary operas of Méhul and Cherubini. Berlioz intended Les Francs-juges for performance at the Odéon theatre and the management accepted it on the basis of Ferrand's libretto. Berlioz threw himself into writing the score in the summer of 1826: the first two acts were finished by June, and he composed the third act in July and August and added the final touches in September. Unfortunately for Berlioz, the Odéon could not obtain government licensing to stage new French operas and Les Francs-juges was shelved. The composer made later attempts to have it performed at the Opéra, the Nouveautés, the German Theatre and in Karlsruhe. He revised it in 1829 and again in 1833, but to no avail. Les Francs-juges was never staged and only five numbers from the original score of 1826 survive complete.

Some of the music was reused in the "Marche au supplice" of the Symphonie fantastique.

== Overture ==
Overture beginning, violin and bassoon parts

This was the first work Berlioz wrote solely for orchestra and it is the earliest of his compositions to retain a place in the repertoire today. It was first performed at the Paris Conservatoire on 26 May 1828 and published in 1836 (the opus number is 3). Franz Liszt prepared a piano transcription of it in 1833 (S.471).

An extract from the overture was used as the theme for the BBC television programme Face to Face.
