= Milde =

Milde may refer to:

== Places ==
- Milde, Bergen, a neighborhood and peninsula in the city of Bergen, Norway
- Milde (river), a river of Saxony-Anhalt, Germany

== People ==
- Carl August Julius Milde, a German bryologist and pteridologist born in Breslau
- Carl Julius Milde, a German painter, curator and art restorer
- Eirik Milde, a Norwegian politician for the Conservative Party
- Franz von Milde, a German tenor, son of Hans and Rosa
- Hans von Milde, an Austrian operatic baritone, husband of Rosa, father of Franz
- Horst Milde, German politician
- Lothar Milde, an East German athlete who competed mainly in the discus throw
- Ludwig Milde, a composer of music for the bassoon
- Paul Milde (footballer), a German footballer who plays as a forward for Dynamo Dresden
- Rosa von Milde née Rosa Agthe (1827–1906), a German operatic soprano and voice teacher, wife of Hans, mother of Franz
- Rocco Milde, a German former footballer who played as a striker
- Tor Milde, a Norwegian music journalist and writer
- Vinzenz Eduard Milde, Prince-Archbishop of Vienna
