= Les Nuits d'été =

Song cycle by Hector Berlioz (!841)

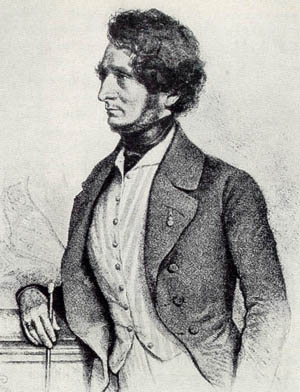
Berlioz in 1845

Les Nuits d'été (Summer Nights), Op. 7, is a song cycle by the French composer Hector Berlioz. It is a setting of six poems by Théophile Gautier. The cycle, completed in 1841, was originally for soloist and piano accompaniment. Berlioz orchestrated one of the songs in 1843, and did the same for the other five in 1856. The cycle was neglected for many years, but during the 20th century it became, and has remained, one of the composer's most popular works. The full orchestral version is more frequently performed in concert and on record than the piano original. The theme of the work is the progress of love, from youthful innocence to loss and finally renewal.

== Background ==
Berlioz and the poet Théophile Gautier were neighbours and friends. Gautier wrote, "Berlioz represents the romantic musical idea ... unexpected effects in sound, tumultuous and Shakespearean depth of passion." It is possible that Berlioz read Gautier's collection La comédie de la mort (The Comedy of Death) before its publication in 1838. Gautier had no objection to his friend's setting six poems from that volume, and Berlioz began in March 1840. The title Nuits d'été was Berlioz's invention, and it is not clear why he chose it: the first song is specifically set in spring rather than summer. The writer Annagret Fauser suggests that Berlioz may have been influenced by the preface to a collection of short stories by his friend Joseph Méry, Les Nuits de Londres, in which the author writes of summer nights in which he and his friends sat outside until dawn telling stories. In a 1989 study of Berlioz, D. Kern Holoman suggests that the title is an allusion to Shakespeare, whose works Berlioz loved.

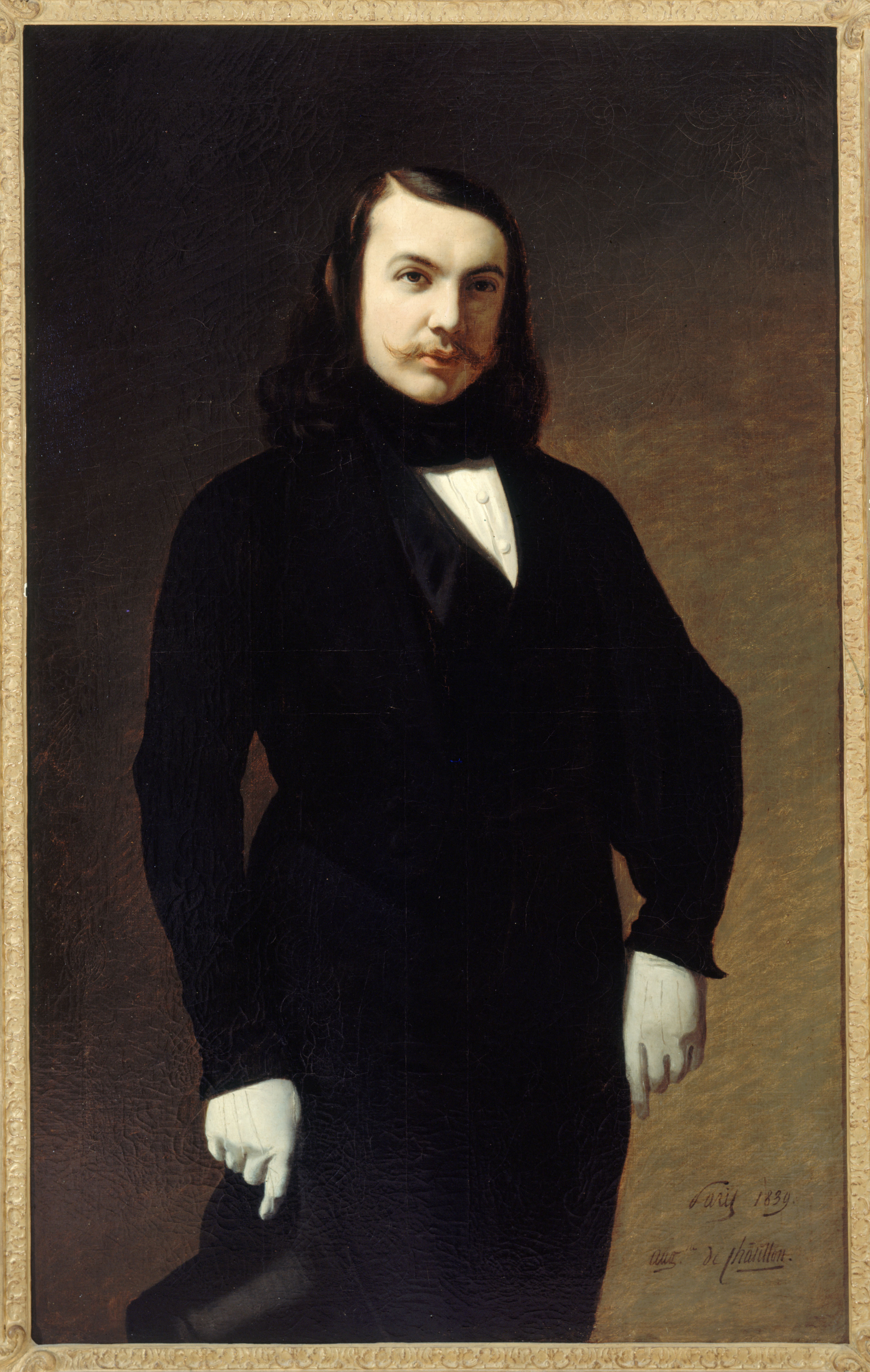
Gautier in 1839

The cycle was complete in its original version for voice (mezzo-soprano or tenor) and piano by 1841. Berlioz later made arrangements for baritone, contralto, or soprano, and piano. The piano version is not as often performed in concert or on record as the orchestrated score, which Berlioz arranged between 1843 and 1856. David Cairns wrote in 1988 that the success of the piano version was impeded by the inferior quality of the piano part in the published score: it is not Berlioz's own, and Cairns described it as "a clumsy, inauthentic piece of work".

In 1843 Berlioz orchestrated the fourth song, "Absence" for his lover, Marie Recio, who premiered it in Leipzig on 23 February 1843; it was not until 1856, that he returned to Les Nuits d'été, making an orchestral arrangement of "Le Spectre de la rose" for the mezzo-soprano Anna Bockholtz-Falconi. The publisher Jakob Rieter-Biedermann was in the audience for the premiere, and, much impressed, prevailed on Berlioz to orchestrate the rest of the cycle. The orchestration left the existing melodic and harmonic writing generally unchanged, but for "Le Spectre de la rose" the composer added an introduction for muted solo cello, flute and clarinet; the orchestration of this song, unlike the other five, includes a harp.

The original piano version had a single dedicatee – Louise Bertin, whose father, Louis-François Bertin, was editor of the Journal des débats, for which Berlioz wrote musical criticism and other articles. Each of the six songs of the orchestral cycle was dedicated individually, to singers well known in Germany, some of whom had performed Berlioz's music there: Louise Wolf ("Villanelle"), Anna Bockholtz-Falconi ("Le Spectre de la rose"), Hans von Milde ("Sur les lagunes"), Madeleine Nottès ("Absence"), Friedrich Caspari ("Au cimetière") and Rosa von Milde ("L'Île inconnue").

For the orchestral version, Berlioz transposed the second and third songs to lower keys. (Note: From D major to B major, and G minor to F minor respectively.) When this version was published, Berlioz specified different voices for the various songs: mezzo-soprano or tenor for "Villanelle", contralto for "Le Spectre de la rose", baritone (or optionally contralto or mezzo) for "Sur les lagunes", mezzo or tenor for "Absence", tenor for "Au cimetière", and mezzo or tenor for "L'Île inconnue". The cycle is nevertheless usually sung by a single soloist, most often a soprano or mezzo-soprano. When the cycle is sung by sopranos the second and third songs are usually transposed back to their original pitches; when lower voices sing the cycle some other songs are often transposed downwards; in the view of the Berlioz scholar Julian Rushton this has a particularly deleterious effect in the first song, the lighthearted "Villanelle".

[The poems] form a narrative which leads from a spring-born joie de vivre ("Villanelle") and a loss of innocence ("Le spectre de la rose"), to the death of a beloved ("Sur les lagunes"), a dirge ("Absence"), the obliteration of her memory ("Au cimetière"), and the beginning of a new future ("L'île inconnue").

— Annagret Fauser

Although Berlioz wrote more than fifty songs, twenty of them with orchestral accompaniment, those in Les Nuits d'été are the only ones published as a set. They are not a cycle on the German model of Schubert's Winterreise or Schumann's Dichterliebe, with narrative and thematic continuity, but form a unified whole by virtue of the single authorship of the words and the composer's use throughout of delicate, atmospheric musical shading. The structure of the cycle has four sombre songs framed by exuberant opening and closing ones. The critic A. E. F. Dickinson wrote in a 1969 study, "Their common theme is nominally love unrequited or lost, symbolizing, arguably, an ache for vanished or unattainable beauty. But their musical order is apparently fortuitous, and forms an acceptable, rather than a compulsive, association." Berlioz's innovative creation of an orchestral song cycle had few successors until Mahler took the genre up in the late 19th century.

As far as is known, the orchestral cycle was not performed in its entirety during the composer's lifetime. The work was neglected for many years, but during the twentieth century it was rediscovered and has become one of Berlioz's best-loved works.

== Music ==
By Berlioz's standards the orchestration is on a modest scale. There is no percussion, and the forces stipulated are the normal string section of violins, violas, cellos and double-basses; woodwind: two flutes, two clarinets, two bassoons, one oboe; brass: three horns; harp.

Villanelle

Le Spectre de la rose

Sur les lagunes: Lamento

Absence

Au cimetière: Clair de lune

L'Île inconnue
Performed by the Eleanor Steber and the Columbia Symphony Orchestra, conducted by Dimitri Mitropoulos

=== Villanelle ===
Quand viendra la saison nouvelle,
Quand auront disparu les froids,
Tous les deux nous irons, ma belle,
Pour cueillir le muguet aux bois ;
Sous nos pieds égrenant les perles
Que l'on voit au matin trembler,
Nous irons écouter les merles
Siffler.

Le printemps est venu, ma belle,
C'est le mois des amants béni,
Et l'oiseau, satinant son aile,
Dit des vers au rebord du nid.
Oh ! viens donc, sur ce banc de mousse
Pour parler de nos beaux amours,
Et dis-moi de ta voix si douce :
Toujours !

Loin, bien loin, égarant nos courses,
Faisons fuir le lapin caché,
Et le daim au miroir des sources
Admirant son grand bois penché ;
Puis chez nous, tout heureux, tout aisés,
En paniers enlaçant nos doigts,
Revenons, rapportant des fraises
Des bois.

Translation:

When the new season comes,
When the cold has vanished,
We will both go, my lovely,
To gather lily of the valley.
Gathering the pearls underfoot,
That one sees shimmering in the morning,
We will hear the blackbirds
Whistle.

Spring has come, my lovely,
It is the month blessed by lovers;
And the bird, preening his wing,
Speaks verse from the edge of his nest.
Oh! come now to this mossy bank
To talk of our beautiful love,
And say to me in your sweet voice:
"Always!"

Far, far away, straying from our path,
Causing the hidden rabbit to flee
And the deer, in the mirror of the spring
Bending to admire his great antlers,
Then home, completely happy and at ease,
Our hands entwined round the basket,
Returning carrying strawberries
From the wood.

Allegretto; A major. Orchestration: 2 flutes, 1 oboe, 2 clarinets in A, 1 bassoon, strings.

The first of the set, "Villanelle", is a celebration of spring and love. It tells of the pleasures of wandering together in the woods to gather wild strawberries, returning home with hands entwined. The setting is strophic; Berlioz maintains the villanelle rhythm of the original poem, while varying the orchestral accompaniment with string counterpoints, and, at the end of each verse, a bassoon solo, pitched higher at each iteration. Rushton comments that these variations "add to the sense of the natural variety and freshness of spring".

=== Le Spectre de la rose ===
Soulève ta paupière close
Qu'effleure un songe virginal ;
Je suis le spectre d'une rose
Que tu portais hier au bal.
Tu me pris, encore emperlée
Des pleurs d'argent, de l'arrosoir,
Et parmi la fête étoilée
Tu me promenas tout le soir.

Ô toi qui de ma mort fus cause,
Sans que tu puisses le chasser,
Toutes les nuits mon spectre rose
À ton chevet viendra danser.
Mais ne crains rien, je ne réclame
Ni messe ni De profundis :
Ce léger parfum est mon âme,
Et j'arrive du paradis.

Mon destin fut digne d'envie:
Et pour avoir un sort si beau,
Plus d'un aurait donné sa vie,
Car sur ton sein j'ai mon tombeau,
Et sur l'albâtre où je repose
Un poète avec un baiser
Écrivit : Ci-gît une rose,
Que tous les rois vont jalouser.

Translation:

Open your closed eyelids
Touched by a virginal dream!
I am the ghost of a rose
That you wore yesterday at the ball.
You took me, still pearly
With silver tears, from the watering can,
And in the starlit party,
You carried me all evening.

O you who caused my death
Without being able to chase it away
Every night my rose-coloured spectre
Will dance by your bedside.
But fear not, I claim neither
Mass nor De profundis.
This light scent is my soul
And I come from Paradise

My destiny is enviable
And to have a fate so beautiful
More than one would have given his life;
For on your breast I have my tomb,
And on the alabaster on which I repose
A poet with a kiss
Wrote, "Here lies a rose
Of which all kings will be jealous."

Adagio un poco lento et dolce assai; B major. Orchestration: 2 flutes, 1 oboe, 2 clarinets in A, 2 horns in E, 1 harp, strings.

"Le spectre de la rose" (The Ghost of the Rose) tells of a girl's dreams of the ghost of the rose she had worn to a ball the previous day. Although the rose has died, it has ascended to paradise; to have died on the girl's breast was a fate that kings might envy. The setting is through-composed. Holoman describes the song as "among the most perfect expressions of French Romanticism".

=== Sur les lagunes: Lamento ===
Ma belle amie est morte :
Je pleurerai toujours
Sous la tombe elle emporte
Mon âme et mes amours.
Dans le ciel, sans m'attendre,
Elle s'en retourna ;
L'ange qui l'emmena
Ne voulut pas me prendre.
Que mon sort est amer !
Ah ! sans amour s'en aller sur la mer !

La blanche créature
Est couchée au cercueil.
Comme dans la nature
Tout me paraît en deuil !
La colombe oubliée
Pleure et songe à l'absent ;
Mon âme pleure et sent
Qu'elle est dépareillée !
Que mon sort est amer !
Ah ! sans amour s'en aller sur la mer !

Sur moi la nuit immense
S'étend comme un linceul ;
Je chante ma romance
Que le ciel entend seul.
Ah ! comme elle était belle
Et comme je l'aimais !
Je n'aimerai jamais
Une femme autant qu'elle.
Que mon sort est amer !
Ah ! sans amour s'en aller sur la mer !

Translation:

My beautiful friend is dead,
I shall weep always;
Under the tomb she has taken
My soul and my love.
To Heaven, without waiting for me,
She has returned;
The angel who took her
Did not want to take me.
How bitter is my fate!
Ah! Without love to sail on the sea!

The white creature
Lies in a coffin;
How in nature
Everything seems to me in mourning!
The forgotten dove
Weeps and dreams of the absent one.
My soul weeps and feels
That it is deserted!
How bitter is my fate!
Ah! Without love to sail on the sea!

Over me the vast night
Spreads like a shroud.
I sing my song
That only Heaven hears:
Ah! How beautiful she was
And how I loved her!
I shall never love
A woman as much as her...
How bitter is my fate!
Ah! Without love to sail on the sea!

Andantino; F minor. Orchestration: 2 flutes, 2 clarinets in B flat, 2 bassoons, 1 horn in C, 1 horn in F, strings.

"Sur les lagunes: Lamento" (On the Lagoons: Lament), with its sombre harmonies and orchestration is imbued with melancholy; the undulating accompaniment suggests the movement of the waves. The poem is the lament of a Venetian boatman at the loss of his beloved, and the pain of sailing out to sea unloved. This is the second of the two through-composed songs in the cycle.

=== Absence ===
Reviens, reviens, ma bien-aimée !
Comme une fleur loin du soleil,
La fleur de ma vie est fermée
Loin de ton sourire vermeil.

Entre nos cœurs quelle distance !
Tant d'espace entre nos baisers !
Ô sort amer ! ô dure absence !
Ô grands désirs inapaisés !

Reviens, reviens, ma belle aimée !
Comme une fleur loin du soleil,
La fleur de ma vie est fermée
Loin de ton sourire vermeil !

D'ici là-bas que de campagnes,
Que de villes et de hameaux,
Que de vallons et de montagnes,
À lasser le pied des chevaux!

Reviens, reviens, ma belle aimée !
Comme une fleur loin du soleil,
La fleur de ma vie est fermée
Loin de ton sourire vermeil !

Translation:

Come back, come back, my beloved!
Like a flower far from the sun,
The flower of my life is closed
Far from your bright red smile!

Between our hearts what a distance!
So much of space between our kisses!
O bitter fate! O harsh absence!
O great desires unappeased!

Come back, come back, my beautiful beloved!
Like a flower far from the sun,
The flower of my life is closed
Far from your bright red smile!

Between here and there what fields,
What towns and hamlets,
What valleys and mountains,
To tire the hoofs of the horses.

Come back, come back, my beautiful beloved!
Like a flower far from the sun,
The flower of my life is closed
Far from your bright red smile!

Adagio; F♯ major. Orchestration: 2 flutes, 1 oboe, 2 clarinets in A, 1 horn in A, 1 horn in D, strings.

The rhetorical "Absence" pleads for the return of the beloved. Rushton suggests that unlike the other five songs, this one may make use of existing music, written for an abandoned cantata, Erigone, and this possibly explains why in this song alone Berlioz cut and rearranged Gautier's verses. This song, and "Au cimetière", which follows, are strophic, with the form A–B–A.

=== Au cimetière: Clair de lune ===
Connaissez-vous la blanche tombe
Où flotte avec un son plaintif
L'ombre d'un if ?
Sur l'if une pâle colombe
Triste et seule au soleil couchant,
Chante son chant ;

Un air maladivement tendre,
À la fois charmant et fatal,
Qui vous fait mal,
Et qu'on voudrait toujours entendre ;
Un air comme en soupire aux cieux
L'ange amoureux.

On dirait que l'âme éveillée
Pleure sous terre à l'unisson
De la chanson,
Et du malheur d'être oubliée
Se plaint dans un roucoulement
Bien doucement.

Sur les ailes de la musique
On sent lentement revenir
Un souvenir ;
Une ombre une forme angélique
Passe dans un rayon tremblant,
En voile blanc.

Les belles de nuit, demi-closes,
Jettent leur parfum faible et doux
Autour de vous,
Et le fantôme aux molles poses
Murmure en vous tendant les bras :
Tu reviendras ?

Oh ! jamais plus, près de la tombe
Je n'irai, quand descend le soir
Au manteau noir,
Écouter la pâle colombe
Chanter sur la pointe de l'if
Son chant plaintif !

Translation:

Do you know the white tomb,
Where there floats with a plaintive sound
The shadow of a yew tree?
On the yew a pale dove
Sitting sad and alone at sunset,
Sings its song:

An air morbidly tender
At once charming and deadly,
That hurts you
And that one would like to hear for ever;
An air like the sigh in Heaven
Of a loving angel.

One might say that an awakened soul
Weeps under the ground in unison
With the song,
And for the misfortune of being forgotten
Complains, cooing
Very softly.

On the wings of the music
One feels slowly returning
A memory.
A shadow, an angelic form
Passes in a shimmering ray
In a white veil.

The belles-de-nuit, half closed,
Cast their weak and sweet scent
Around you,
And the ghost in a gentle pose
Murmurs, stretching its arms to you:
Will you return?

Oh! Never again by the grave
Will I go, when evening falls
In a black cloak,
To hear the pale dove
Singing at the top of the yew
Its plaintive song.

Andantino non troppo lento; D major. Orchestration: 2 flutes, 2 clarinets in A; strings.

"Au cimetière: Clair de lune" (At the Cemetery: Moonlight), is a further lament, with the bereaved lover now more distant from the memory of his beloved, and perturbed by a ghostly vision of her.

=== L'Île inconnue ===
Dites, la jeune belle,
Où voulez-vous aller ?
La voile enfle son aile,
La brise va souffler.

L'aviron est d'ivoire,
Le pavillon de moire,
Le gouvernail d'or fin ;
J'ai pour lest une orange,
Pour voile une aile d'ange,
Pour mousse un séraphin.

Dites, la jeune belle,
Où voulez-vous aller ?
La voile enfle son aile,
La brise va souffler.

Est-ce dans la Baltique ?
Dans la mer Pacifique ?
Dans l'île de Java ?
Ou bien est-ce en Norvège,
Cueillir la fleur de neige,
Ou la fleur d'Angsoka ?

Dites, dites, la jeune belle,
dites, où voulez-vous aller ?

Menez-moi, dit la belle,
À la rive fidèle
Où l'on aime toujours !
Cette rive, ma chère,
On ne la connaît guère
Au pays des amours.

Où voulez-vous aller ?
La brise va souffler.

Translation:

Tell me, young beauty,
Where do you want to go?
The sail swells its wing,
The breeze begins to blow.

The oar is of ivory,
The flag is of moire,
The rudder of fine gold;
I have for ballast an orange,
For sail an angel's wing
For cabin boy a seraph

Tell me, young beauty,
Where do you want to go?
The sail swells its wing,
The breeze begins to blow.

Is it to the Baltic?
To the Pacific Ocean?
The isle of Java?
Or perhaps to Norway,
To pick the snow-flower
Or the flower of Angsoka?

Tell me, tell me, young beauty,
tell me, where do you want to go?

"Take me," says the beautiful one,
"To the faithful shore
Where one loves for ever!"
That shore, my dear,
Is almost unknown
In the land of love.

Where do you want to go?
The breeze begins to blow.

Allegro spiritoso; F major. orchestration: 2 flutes, 1 oboe, 2 clarinets in B flat, 2 bassoons, 1 horn in F, 1 horn in C, 1 horn in B flat, strings.

"L'Île inconnue" (The Unknown Island) hints at the unattainable – a place where love can be eternal. Rushton describes the song as "cheerfully ironic", set by Berlioz "with a Venetian swing". This closing song is strophic, with the form A–B–A–C–A′–D–A″.

British composer David Matthews has arranged the cycle for baritone and string sextet (2021, premiered by Christian Gerhaher) and soprano and string sextet (2026).

== Recordings ==
The growing popularity of the work was reflected in the number of complete recordings issued in the LP era. Among those are versions sung by Suzanne Danco, Eleanor Steber and Victoria de los Ángeles in mono recordings and Régine Crespin, Leontyne Price, Janet Baker and Frederica von Stade in stereo. More recent recordings have featured Véronique Gens, Anne Sofie von Otter, Bernarda Fink and Lorraine Hunt Lieberson. Recordings by male singers include those by Nicolai Gedda, Ian Bostridge, Stéphane Degout and José van Dam. The piano version has been recorded from time to time, and there have been three studio recordings of the orchestral version with multiple singers, as stipulated in the orchestral score; these were conducted by Sir Colin Davis, Sir John Eliot Gardiner and Pierre Boulez. Conductors of other versions have included Ernest Ansermet, Sir John Barbirolli, James Levine, Dimitri Mitropoulos, Charles Munch, Fritz Reiner and Seiji Ozawa.

== Notes, references and sources ==
=== Sources ===
- Anderson, Keith (2005). Berlioz: Les nuits d'été (Media notes). Naxos Records. OCLC 232300936. CD 8. 557274.
- Berlioz, Hector; Gautier, Théophile (1904) [1856]. Les nuits d'été. Leipzig: Breitkopf & Härtel. OCLC 611290556.
- Blakeman, Edward (1989). Les nuits d'été (Media notes). Chandos Records. OCLC 22246622. CD Chan 8735.
- Cairns, David (1988). "Berlioz". In Alan Blyth (ed.). Song on Record. Cambridge University Press. ISBN 978-0-521-36173-6.
- Dickinson, Alan Edgar Frederic (July 1969). "Berlioz's Songs". The Musical Quarterly. 55 (3): 329–343. doi:10.1093/mq/LV.3.329. JSTOR 741004.
- Fauser, Annagret (2000). "The songs". In Peter Bloom (ed.). The Cambridge Companion to Berlioz. Cambridge Companions to Music. Cambridge University Press. ISBN 978-0-521-59638-1.
- Gérard, Yves (2000). Berlioz, Les nuits d'été, La mort de Cléopâtre, mélodies (Media notes). Paris: Virgin. pp. 3–7. 45422.
- Holoman, D. Kern (1989). Berlioz. Harvard University Press. ISBN 978-0-674-06778-3.
- Rushton, Julian (2001). The Music of Berlioz. Oxford University Press. ISBN 978-0-19-816690-0.
- Rushton, Julian (2013). Berlioz: Les nuits d'été (Media notes). Karen Cargill, mezzo-soprano; Robin Ticciati, conductor; Scottish Chamber Orchestra. Linn Records.
