= Recio =

Recio may refer to:

- Lope Recio Loynaz (1860–1927), Cuban general
- Marie Recio (1814–1862), French opera singer and second wife of composer Hector Berlioz
- Fernando Recio (born 1982), Spanish footballer
- Recio (footballer), Spanish footballer José Luis García del Pozo (born 1991)
