= Der Barbier von Bagdad =

Comic opera by Peter Cornelius

- Comic opera by Peter Cornelius
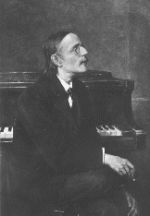
- The composer
- Translation: The Barber of Baghdad
- Librettist: Cornelius
- Language: German
- Based on: One Thousand and One Nights
- Premiere: 15 December 1858; Hoftheater, Weimar

Der Barbier von Bagdad (The Barber of Baghdad) is a comic opera in two acts by Peter Cornelius to a German libretto by the composer, based on The Tale of the Tailor and The Barber’s Stories of his Six Brothers in One Thousand and One Nights. The first of three operas by Cornelius, the piece was first performed at the Hoftheater in Weimar on 15 December 1858.

== Performance history ==
Cornelius planned the work as a one-act comedy, but on the advice of Franz Liszt expanded it to two. Franz Liszt later arranged the second overture for orchestra (S.352). Unlike most German comic operas of the period, which have spoken dialogue, Der Barbier von Bagdad is through composed. Cornelius offered the inventive and complex opera as an alternative to the contemporary German opera composers such as Richard Wagner, whose ideological fervor he found overwhelming.

At its first performance the opera was a failure, and it was not played again in the composer's lifetime. The composer's mentor and friend Franz Liszt conducted the premiere. However, political actions by the director of the theater resulted in demonstrations against Liszt and the so-called neo-German school of composition. The opera closed after only one performance, and Liszt resigned his post. Cornelius also left Weimar.

In the late 19th century two versions were made, by the noted Wagnerian conductors Felix Mottl and Hermann Levi. In the United States the work was first performed by the Metropolitan Opera at the Metropolitan Opera House on January 3, 1890 in a production directed by Theodor Habelmann. Walter Damrosch led the musical forces, and the cast included Emil Fischer as Abul Hassan, Sophie Traubmann as Margiana, Paul Kalisch as Nureddin, Charlotte Huhn as Bostana, Wilhelm Sedlmayer as Mustapha, and Joseph Beck as The Caliph. It was performed in London in 1891. Finally, in June 1904, the original version as composed by Cornelius was again staged in the Weimar Hoftheater, this time to popular approval and critical acclaim.

In the 20th century, the opera was performed infrequently abroad but held its own in German opera companies using the original text, rather than Mottl's or Levi's revisions. It has a minor niche in the operatic repertoire.

== Roles ==
| Role | Voice type | Premiere cast, 15 December 1858 (Conductor: Franz Liszt) |
|---|---|---|
| Nureddin | tenor | Friedrich Caspari |
| Bostana | mezzo-soprano | Frl. Wolf |
| Abdul Hassan Ali Ebn Bekar, the barber | bass | Carl Roth |
| Margiana | soprano | Rosa von Milde |
| Baba Mustapha, the Cadi | tenor | Karl Knopp |
| The Caliph | baritone | Feodor von Milde |
Chorus: servants of Nureddin, friends of the Cadi, people of Baghdad, mourning women, followers of the Caliph.

== Synopsis ==
The hero, Nureddin, is in love with Margiana, daughter of the Cadi. Bostana, a relative of the Cadi, approving of Nureddin, helps him to woo Margiana by making himself presentable. Abdul Hassan, the barber, is summoned, and, like his confrère of Seville in Rossini's earlier opera, he adopts the role of co-conspirator in the romance. (Like Rossini's Figaro, he delivers a virtuoso patter aria, "Bin Akademiker".) Margiana waits for Nureddin in the women's quarters of her father's house. He is proposing to marry her off to a rich friend, but when he leaves, Nureddin enters to woo Margiana. A traditional farcical plot then unfolds, with the barber breaking in, Nureddin hiding in a treasure chest and being carried away by servants, and a happy ending when the Caliph arrives and Nureddin is released and betrothed to Margiana.

== Recordings ==
- 1939: Leonhardt – Eipperle/Waldenau/Osswald/Ludwig-W/Welitsch/Hann – Koch Schwann (live in Stuttgart)
- 1951: Keilberth – Schlemm/Roesler/Offermanns/Schock/Schmitt-Walter/Böhme – Gebhardt
- 1952: Hollreiser – Jurinac/Rössl-Majdan/Majkut/Schock/Poell/Frick – Melodram (live in Vienna, mono)
- 1956: Leinsdorf – Schwarzkopf/Hoffmann/Unger/Gedda/Prey/Czerwenka – EMI
- 1957: Matzerath - Helmut Krebs, Benno Kusche, Anneliese Rothenberger, Josef Greindl, Richard Holm & Gisela Litz - Walhall Eternity Series
- 1973: Hollreiser – Geszty/Schmidt-T/Unger/Kraus-Ad/Weikl/Ridderbusch, Bavarian Radio Chorus and Bavarian Radio Symphony Orchestra – Eurodisc (live in Munich), Preiser Records, CD Cat: MONO 20035 2CD
- 1974: Leitner – Donath/Schiml/Peter/Laubenthal/Duesing/Sotin; Kölner Rundfunk-Sinfonie-Orchester und Chor – Profil, CD Cat: PH08037
