= Natalie von Milde =

German writer & feminist activist (1850–1906)

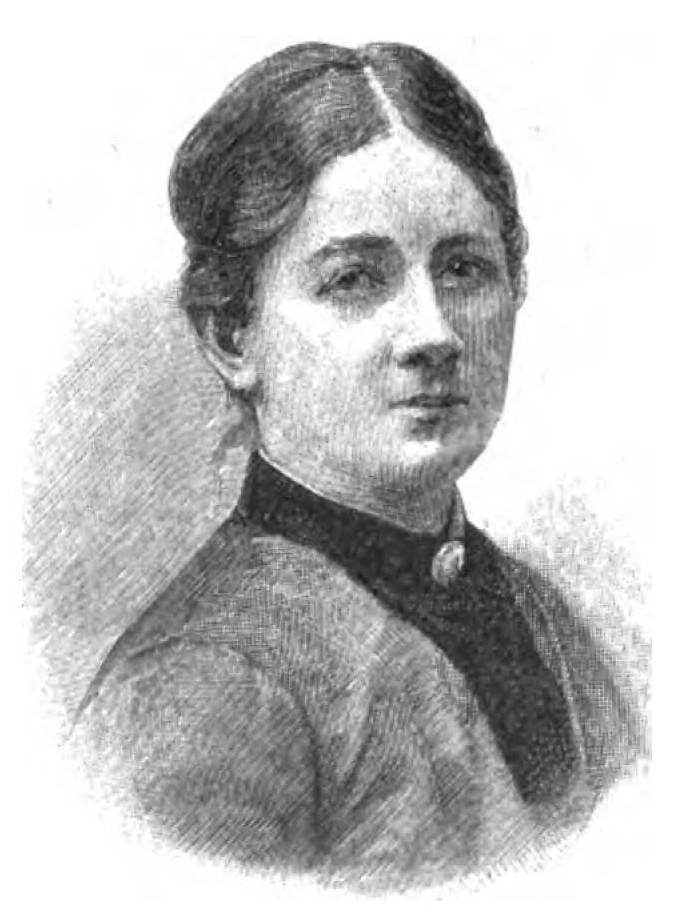
Natalie von Milde

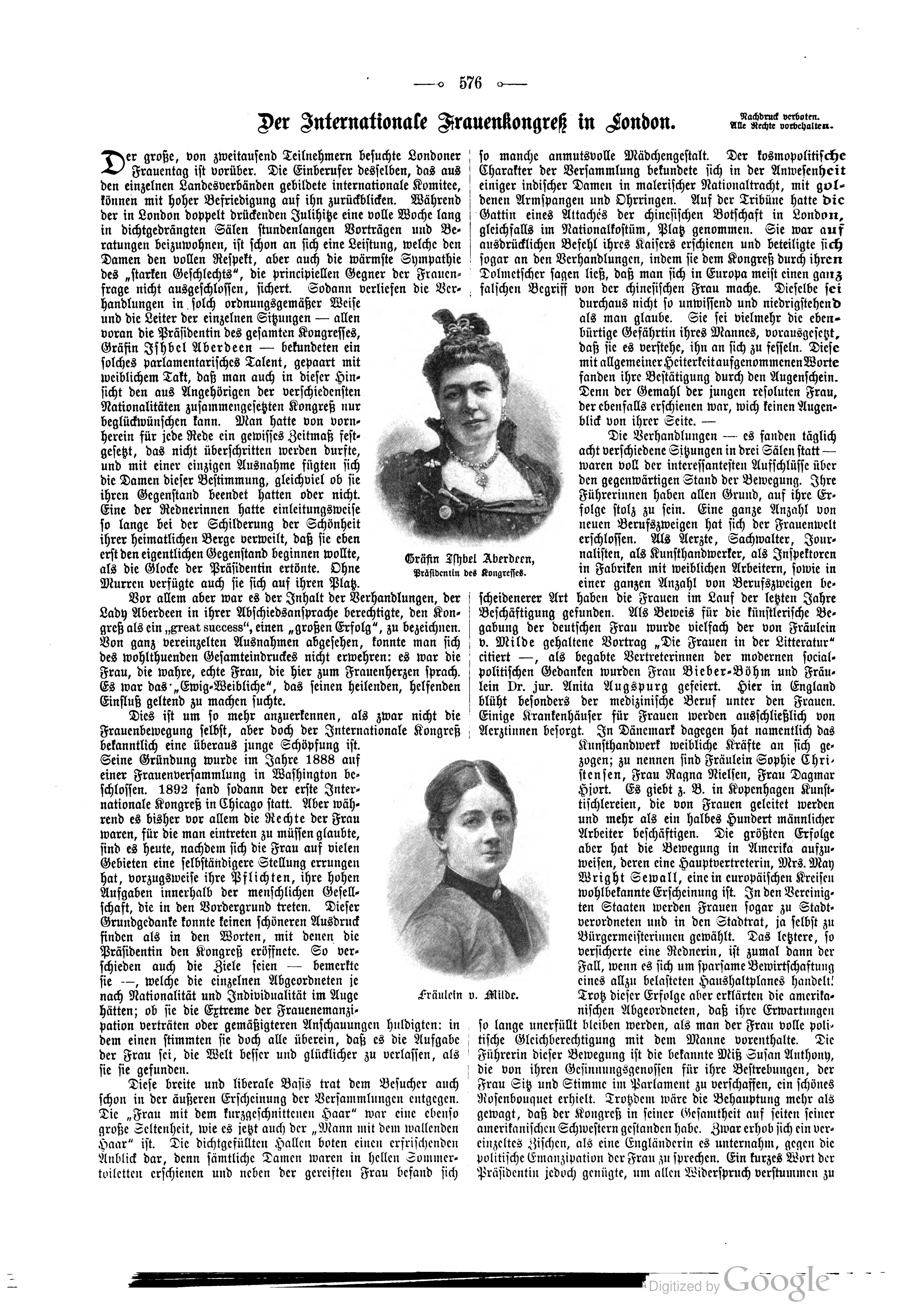
Natalie von Milde

Natalie von Milde, Natalie Haller until 1881 (31 March 1850 – 29 March 1906) was a German writer and feminist. She was an adoptive daughter of Rosa von Milde (1827–1906) and Hans Feodor von Milde (1821–1899).

== Life ==
Haller was born in Munich. She was probably the illegitimate daughter of a Frau Geheimrat Jakobsohn. From the late 1850s she lived in Weimar in the household of Rosa and Hans Feodor von Milde. There she received music lessons from Rosa von Milde and Carl Müllerhartung. Due to diphtheria and permanent weakening of her voice, she had to abandon her vocal training. She then took private lessons in psychology with Karl Volkmar Stoy in Jena in 1879/80. It was not until 1881 that she was adopted by the Milde couple.

Milde gave lectures on topical women's issues from 1880 onwards. In 1888, she joined the Deutschen Frauenverein Reform, which was founded by Hedwig Kettler in Weimar in the same year. In 1900, she became the first chairperson of the Frauenbildung-Frauenstudium association in Weimar. She founded a Reading Room for Women in 1902 with the support of Princess Pauline of Saxe-Weimar-Eisenach. Milde was a friend of Helene Böhlau, the Stuttgart court librarian Wilhelm Hemsen (1829–1885), Marie von Ebner-Eschenbach and Marie von Bülow, among others. Her literary work deals with issues of women's emancipation such as legal equality of men and women and equal opportunities in education and work.

Books from her collection are held in the Herzogin-Anna-Amalia-Bibliothek.

Milde died in Weimar short of her 56th birthday.

== Publications ==
- Under the pseudonym J. M.: Goethe über Frauen-Emancipation. In Frauenberuf 2, Nr. 4/1888.
- Frauenfrage und Männerbedenken. Ein Beitrag zur Verständigung. Oehmigkes Verlag, Berlin 1890.
- Der Richter zwischen Mann und Weib. L. Thelemann, Weimar 1893.
- Goethe-Geburtstagsbuch. A. Karrer, Weimar 1894.
- Goethe und Schiller und die Frauenfrage. H. Seippel, Weimar and Hamburg 1896.
- Ist die Frauenbewegung natürlich? Vortrag, geh. am 5 October 1896 im Auftrage der Hamburger Ortsgruppe des Allgemeinen deutschen Frauenvereins. Weimar 1896.
- Frauenliebe und -Leben in der Literatur. In Düna Zeitung vom 31 March 1897, S. 1 f..
- Unsere Schriftstellerinnen und die Frauenbewegung. 1900.
- Gegenwart und Zukunft der Familie. Eine Entgegnung auf den gleichnamigen Artikel des Herrn Gustav von Schmoller. 1902.
- Maria Pawlowna. Ein Gedenkblatt zum 9. November 1904. 1904.
- As editor: Briefe in Poesie und Prosa von Peter Cornelius an Theodor und Rosa von Milde. Weimar 1901.
