= Alfonso und Estrella =

Opera by Franz Schubert

- Opera by Franz Schubert
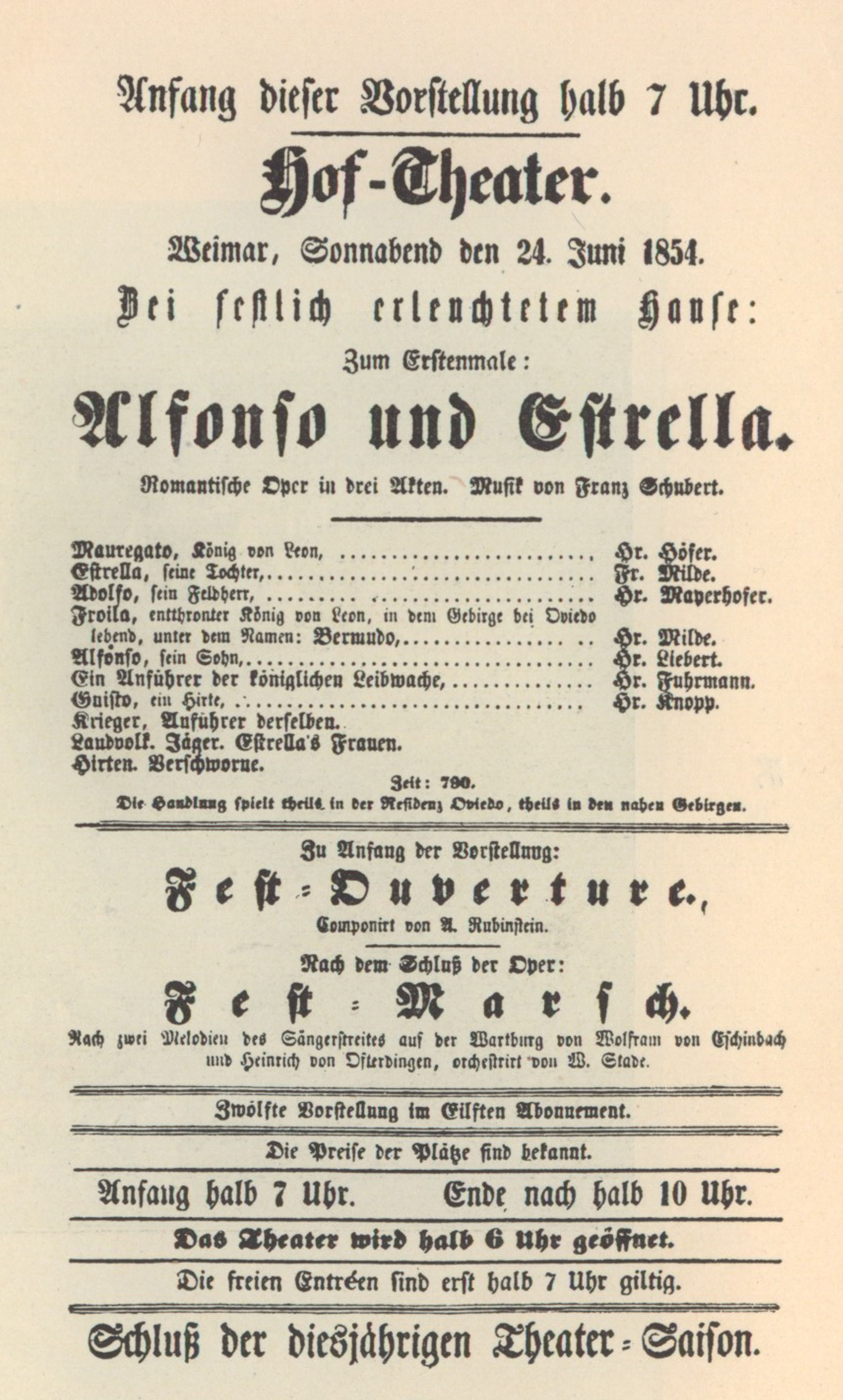
- Playbill Weimar 1854, conductor Liszt
- Librettist: Franz von Schober
- Language: German
- Premiere: 24 June 1854; Weimar Court Theatre

Alfonso und Estrella (Alfonso and Estrella), D. 732, is an opera with music by Franz Schubert, set to a German libretto by Franz von Schober, written in 1822. Like Fierrabras (1823), it marks Schubert's attempt to compose grand Romantic opera in German, departing from the Singspiel tradition. Unlike Fierrabras, it contains no spoken dialogue.

== Background ==
In close collaboration with von Schober in the region of Sankt Pölten, Schubert wrote the vocal numbers of Alfonso und Estrella between September 1821 and February 1822. Schober, only one year older than the young Schubert, and a dabbler in literature, music and theatre, was enthusiastic about the collaboration. Schubert and Schober shared an appreciation for the operatic theories of Ignaz von Mosel, a patron of Schubert's, who supported Gluck's operatic ideals. This influence may have led to the omission of all spoken dialog, parting from the German Singspiel form followed in operas such as Mozart's Die Zauberflöte, Beethoven's Fidelio, and Weber's Der Freischütz.

== Overture ==
The earliest date on an autograph score of the overture is November 1822, the date Schubert wrote on its solo piano version (D. 759a). As that version is a piano reduction, it is assumed that the orchestral version of the overture must have been written at an earlier date. 1823 is however the only other date found on autographs of the overture: the version for piano duet, D. 773, dates from that year, and in December of the same year Schubert used the orchestral version as overture to the stage production of Rosamunde, while he found the Alfonso und Estrella overture too "noisy" for this opera, for which he intended to write a new one. The date of December 1823 found on the autograph of the orchestral score of the only extant overture for Alfonso und Estrella thus rather refers to its use as incidental music to the Rosamunde play, than that it would have been its composition date.

The piano duet version of the overture (D. 773) was published as Schubert's Op. 52 in 1826. Shortly after the composer's death in 1828, that version was republished as his Op. 69, which is the opus number that remained associated with the piano versions of the overture: the solo piano version of the overture, D. 759a, was published around 1839 with the same opus number. The score of the orchestral version of the overture was first published in 1867, a quarter of a century before the remainder of the orchestral score was first published in the 5th volume of Series XV of the Alte Gesamt-Ausgabe. In that edition the overture had been published in the 4th volume of the same series, as Rosamunde overture. In the earlier publications, including those of its piano versions, the overture had been marked as belonging to Alfonso und Estrella.

== Performance history ==
Apart from the overture in the 1823 Rosamunde production, the orchestral version of the opera was not staged in Schubert's lifetime. Opera houses in Vienna, Berlin, Dresden and Graz had refused it. The opera received its premiere performance at the Weimar Court Theatre on 24 June 1854, conducted by Franz Liszt. Liszt had published an essay on the opera in advance of the first Weimar performance, and also had made cuts to the score for the production. Subsequent productions in the 1880s were in Karlsruhe, Vienna and Berlin. The first UK stage premiere was at Reading University Opera on 22 February 1977. The opera did not receive a complete, uncut performance; even the realisations in Graz (1991) and Vienna (1997, conducted by Harnoncourt) had been shortened.

== Context and analysis ==
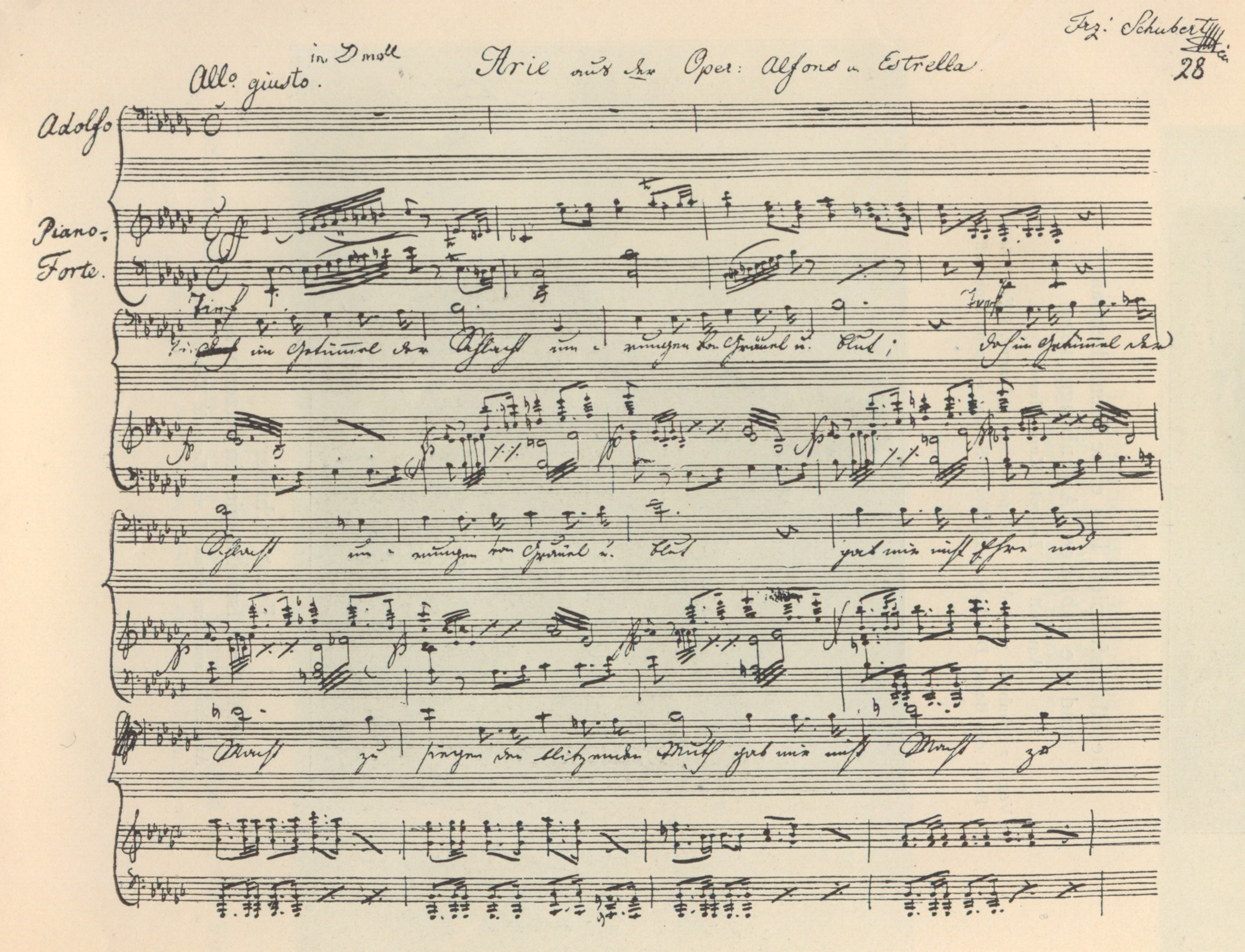
Autograph vocal score, Aria Adolfo

Although it is believed Schubert intended to compose a grand Romantic opera, employing a large chorus and orchestra, at many points in the work he retained the simpler style of his earlier Singspiels. At other times, however, strong vocal lines, rich orchestration, and jarring harmonic progressions predominate. McKay has noted that, "[i]n such sections Schubert shows not only his genius for setting words to music and his sensitivity to orchestral colors but also his ability to manage the large resources of big operatic ensembles." As one critic has elegantly stated, "Schubert's great operatic asset – aside from his incredible gift for melody – was the ability to take cues from a word, a thought or a verbal description and translate them into musical accompaniment."

A repeated criticism of the opera is its lack of dramatic action and pacing. Critics have suggested it is precisely because Schubert had minimal opportunity to see his late dramatic works performed during his lifetime that he lacked the perspective, and that which might have been revealed by it, available to other composers such as Beethoven who revised Fidelio on multiple occasions after public performance, to judge his operas from a distance. Elizabeth Norman McKay has noted how Schubert incorporated his understanding of the music of Gioachino Rossini into the opera. German musicologist Till Gerrit Waidelich has published a monograph on the opera, detailing its history in composition and performance.

== Roles ==
Roles, voice types, premiere cast
Role	Voice type	Premiere cast, 24 June 1854 (Conductor: Franz Liszt)
King Froila	baritone	August Höfer
Mauregato, the usurper	baritone	Hans von Milde
Estrella, Mauregato's daughter	soprano	Rosa von Milde
Alfonso, King Froila's son	tenor	Eduard Liebert
Adolfo, Mauregato's general	bass	Carl Mayerhofer

== Synopsis ==
Alfonso is the son of the deposed King Froila, of León. Froila is concerned that Alfonso is anxious to lead a revolt against Mauregato, the usurper of Froila's throne. At the court of Leon, Adolfo, an ambitious general, is in love with Estrella, the daughter of Mauregato. However, Mauregato has said that only the man who has the "Chain of Eurich" may marry Estrella. Angry at being denied Estrella in marriage, Adolfo plans a coup against Mauregato.

During a hunting expedition, Estrella is separated from her party. She and Alfonso meet and fall in love, unaware of the identity of the other. Alfonso gives Estrella a necklace that he has always carried, and directs her on a safe path home. Back at court, she tells her story, and Mauregato recognizes the necklace as the "Chain of Eurich". Before he can tell her of its meaning, the rebellion led by Adolfo has begun, and Adolfo captures Estrella. Alfonso learns that Estrella is Mauregato's daughter, and then sides with Mauregato against the rebels. Mauregato's forces defeat Adolfo, and Alfonso rescues Estrella. However, Mauregato has a crisis of conscience, and he restores Froila to his throne. In turn, Froila gives up his power to Alfonso and Estrella.

Historically, the Kingdom of León did have a king called Froila, whose son was Alfonso, and the kingdom was in their time troubled by instability and power struggles, including a possible usurpation by a Mauregatus.

== Recordings ==
A complete recording of the opera was issued in 1978, with Otmar Suitner conducting the Staatskapelle Berlin and Berlin Radio Choir and major parts sung by Edith Mathis (Estrella), Peter Schreier (Alfonso), Hermann Prey (Mauregato), Dietrich Fischer-Dieskau (Froila) and Theo Adam (Adolfo). Originally made by the East German record company VEB Deutsche Schallplatten, it was first issued in the West on EMI (US catalogue: Angel SCLX-3878) and has since been issued on CD on Berlin Classics 0021562BC. Re-issued in 2013 by Brilliant Classics, 3CD 94689 5028421946894.

- Video on DVD: 2004 Teatro Lirico di Cagliari, Gérard Korsten, conductor
  Cast: Eva Mei, Rainer Trost, Alfred Muff, Markus Werba – Dynamic (record label), Cat. 33451
- Video on DVD: 2009 Naxos Opera DVD 2.110260 (Opera in 3 acts, complete) Conductor: Nikolaus Harnoncourt, Chamber Orchestra of Europe, Arnold Schoenberg Choir. Cast: Mauregato: Olaf Bär, Estrella: Ľuba Orgonášová, Adolfo: Alfred Muff, Froila: Thomas Hampson, Alfonso: Endrik Wottrich, stage director: Jürgen Flimm. Recorded in Vienna 1997.
