= Loynaz =

Loynaz is a surname. Notable people with the surname include:

- Dulce María Loynaz (1902–1997), Cuban poet
- Lope Recio Loynaz (1860–1927), Cuban general
