= La Symphonie fantastique =

- Directed by: Christian-Jaque
- Written by: Jean-Pierre Feydeau; André Legrand
- Produced by: Alfred Greven
- Cinematography: Armand Thirard
- Edited by: Jacques Desagneaux
- Music by: Hector Berlioz; Carl Maria von Weber
- Production company: Continental Films
- Release date: 1 April 1942 (France)
- Country: France
- Language: French

La Symphonie fantastique is a 1942 French drama film by Christian-Jaque and produced by the German-controlled French film production company Continental Films. The film is based upon the life of the French composer Hector Berlioz. The title is taken from the five-movement programmatic Symphonie fantastique of 1830. The film lasts around 90 minutes and was first shown at the 'Normandie' cinema in Paris on 1 April 1942. The posters at the premiere contained the sub-title 'La Vie passionnée et glorieuse d'un génie' (which links with the quote from Hugo at the very end of the film).

The French Bibliothèque du film (BiFi) contains an earlier draft plan for the film which envisaged a less realistic, more fantastic treatment of the story, entitled La Symphonie du rêve, with Pierre Fresnay in the central role.

The cast included several members of the Comédie-Française (Barrault, Saint-Cyr, Seigner, Berthau, Delamare, Fonteney). Barrault took part in a BBC2 programme in 1969 on the centenary of the composer's death, as Berlioz again, and in the autobiographical Lélio, sequel to the symphony. Shortly after the film was released, Goebbels, having learnt of it, was displeased, considering it too patriotic and determined to summon the German producer Alfred Greven to Berlin to remind him that the French should only have light and superficial new films – and not cultivate French nationalism.

== Synopsis ==
The film is biographical, telling the story of the life and artistic struggles of the French composer Hector Berlioz. Berlioz is shown as a recalcitrant medical student in an anatomy class dreaming of becoming a composer; at a demonstration during a performance at the Paris Opéra conducted by Habeneck; at supper with other young artists (Hugo, Janin, Dumas, Mérimée, Delacroix); and chasing after his future wife Harriet Smithson, after a performance of Hamlet. Also depicted are his life in a garret, while suffering from an illness due to an abscess in the throat; a visit from his mother who curses him; and the composition of the Symphonie fantastique. The film then shows his marital breakdown, the premiere of his opera Benvenuto Cellini, his travels throughout Europe, his second marriage to Marie Recio (called "Marie Martin" in the film), public acceptance in old age and reconciliation with his son.

The film makes a vivid recreation of important public sites: a lecture theatre at the Faculty of Medicine, backstage at the Théâtre de l'Odéon, the Paris Opera, Montmartre lanes as well as salons and cafés.

== Cast ==
- Jean-Louis Barrault: Hector Berlioz
- Renée Saint-Cyr: Marie Martin
- Lise Delamare: Harriet Smithson
- Jules Berry: Maurice Schlesinger
- Bernard Blier: Antoine Charbonnel, friend of Berlioz
- Gilbert Gil: Louis Berlioz (son)
- Julien Bertheau: Victor Hugo
- Catherine Fonteney: Berlioz’s mother
- Louis Seigner: François Antoine Habeneck
- Louis Salou: opera director
- Georges Vitray: captain
- Jacques Dynam:
- Marcelle Monthil: Smithson’s dresser
- Mona Dol: a maid
- Maurice Schutz: Niccolò Paganini
- Pierre Magnier: anatomy lecturer
- Roland Armontel: Eugène Delacroix
- Jean Darcante: Prosper Mérimée
- René Fluet: Jules Janin
- Georges Gosset: Alexandre Dumas
- Joé Davray: a student
- Georges Lafon: Russian minister
- Martial Rèbe: Smithson’s coachman
- Noël Roquevert: policeman
- Lucien Coëdel: printer
- Michel Vitold: conductor
- Georges Mauloy: the dean

== Music ==
As well as the symphony, the music used in the film includes the Invitation to the Dance by Weber, Roméo et Juliette (during the scene where Berlioz and Smithson fall in love), a staged excerpt from the first act of Benvenuto Cellini, the Rákóczi March from La damnation de Faust and the Requiem.

== DVD release ==
In 2003 the film was re-issued by René Chateau Video.
