= Marie Recio =

French opera singer (1814–1862)

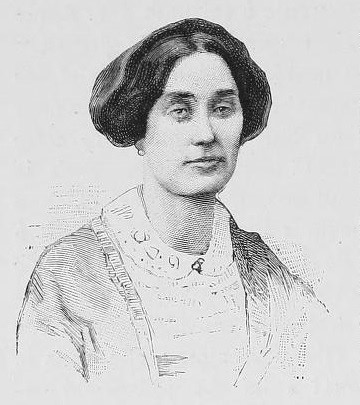
Portrait of Recio from a photograph taken in Paris

Marie Recio, née Marie-Geneviève Martin, (10 June 1814 – 13 June 1862) was a French opera singer (mezzo-soprano), and the second wife of Hector Berlioz.

== Biography ==
Marie Recio was born in Châtenay-Malabry to a French military father, Colonel Joseph Martin (1758-1836), battalion commander, and a Spanish mother, Marie Sotera Villas Recio. Peter Bloom believes that it is likely that she took singing lessons from the great Italian singer David Banderali (an academic at the Conservatoire de Paris from 1828 to 1849), being the friend of his daughter, Anne Barthe. In the 1830s, she became a professional singer in Paris.

Berlioz and Marie met around 1840. It was potentially for Marie Recio that Berlioz began Les Nuits d'été, with Absence (1841, the fourth piece of the final collection), which she often sang and that the musician orchestrated as soon as 1843. Berlioz himself confided, "She's meowing like a dozen cats."

Due to Berlioz's influence, she made her debut at the Opéra-Comique on 9 October 1841, but she only held the position for a few months. Her repertoire was limited: Inès in Donizetti's La Favorite, Isolier in Rossini's Le Comte Ory and Alice in Meyerbeer's Robert le Diable. It seems that the singer had stage fright, which deprived her of her skills.

Marie and Berlioz travelled to Brussels in September 1842 and she accompanied him on his various journeys to Prague in 1846.

The couple lived together from 1844 and for almost twenty years. He married her on 19 October 1854, at the Sainte Trinité church in Paris. During these years, she became a collaborator and manager of the musician.

She died of a heart disease at a friend's home in Saint-Germain-en-Laye at age 48. Her mother stayed with the composer until his last days.

She was portrayed by actress Renée Saint-Cyr, in La Symphonie fantastique (1942), a feature film by Christian-Jaque.

== Bibliography ==
- Nectoux, Jean-Michel; Citron, Pierre & Reynaud, Cécile (2003). "Nuits d'été, Les". Dictionnaire Berlioz (in French). Paris: Fayard. pp. 385–389. ISBN 2-213-61528-4. Nectoux2003.
- Bloom, Peter; Citron, Pierre & Reynaud, Cécile (2003). "Recio, Marie". Dictionnaire Berlioz (in French). Paris: Fayard. pp. 449–452. ISBN 2-213-61528-4. Bloom2003.
- Pierre-Jean Remy, Dictionnaire amoureux de l'opéra, Plon, 2014, 1076 pages ISBN 2259215750, OCLC 419830672, p. 688 Read online
- Pascal Beyls, Marie Recio, 1814-1862 — seconde épouse de Berlioz. 2015, 209 pages OCLC 919025220, BnF 443243869
