= Sophie Traubmann =

American opera singer

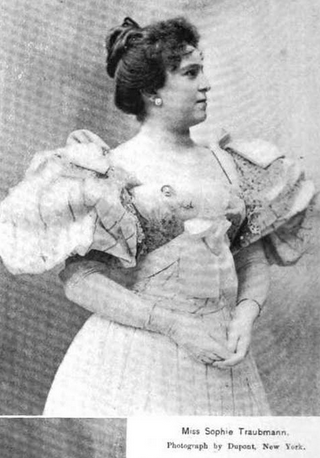
Sophie Traubmann, from an 1897 publication

Sophie Traubmann (May 12, 1867 – August 16, 1951) was an American soprano.

Born in New York City, Traubmann studied in that city and in Paris, where her teachers included Pauline Viardot and Mathilde Marchesi. She was coached in the performance of numerous Richard Wagner roles by Cosima Wagner. She made her debut at the Academy of Music in her native city singing Venus in Tannhäuser. She was the first Woglinde in Der Ring des Nibelungen for American audiences. She also created the role of Margiana in Der Barbier von Bagdad at its American premiere. Traubmann sang at the Metropolitan Opera for three seasons, beginning in 1887, and was also active as a soloist at numerous European opera houses during her career.
