= Franz von Milde =

German tenor (1855–1929)

Franz Ludwig Hermann von Milde (4 March 1855 – 6 December 1929) was a German operatic baritone and voice teacher.

== Life ==
Born in Weimar, Milde was a son of the couple Hans Feodor and Rosa von Milde, née Agthe. Like his brother Rudolf, he was initially trained mainly by his mother. In 1876, he made his debut at the Weimar court theatre. From 1878 to 1906, he was an ensemble member at the court theatre in Hanover. His roles included, for example, Valentin in Gounod's Faust, Wolfram in Tannhäuser and the Count in The Marriage of Figaro. Franz von Milde, who had already given singing lessons in Hanover in addition to his work as an opera singer, became a professor at the Hochschule für Musik und Theater München in 1906. He taught there until 1926. In 1918 he published the book Ein ideales Künstlerehepaar. Rosa und Feodor von Milde. Ihre Kunst und ihre Zeit.

Milde was best man at the wedding of Bernhard Stavenhagen with Agnes Denninghoff.

Milde died in Munich at the age of 74.
