= Charlotte Huhn =

German operatic contralto

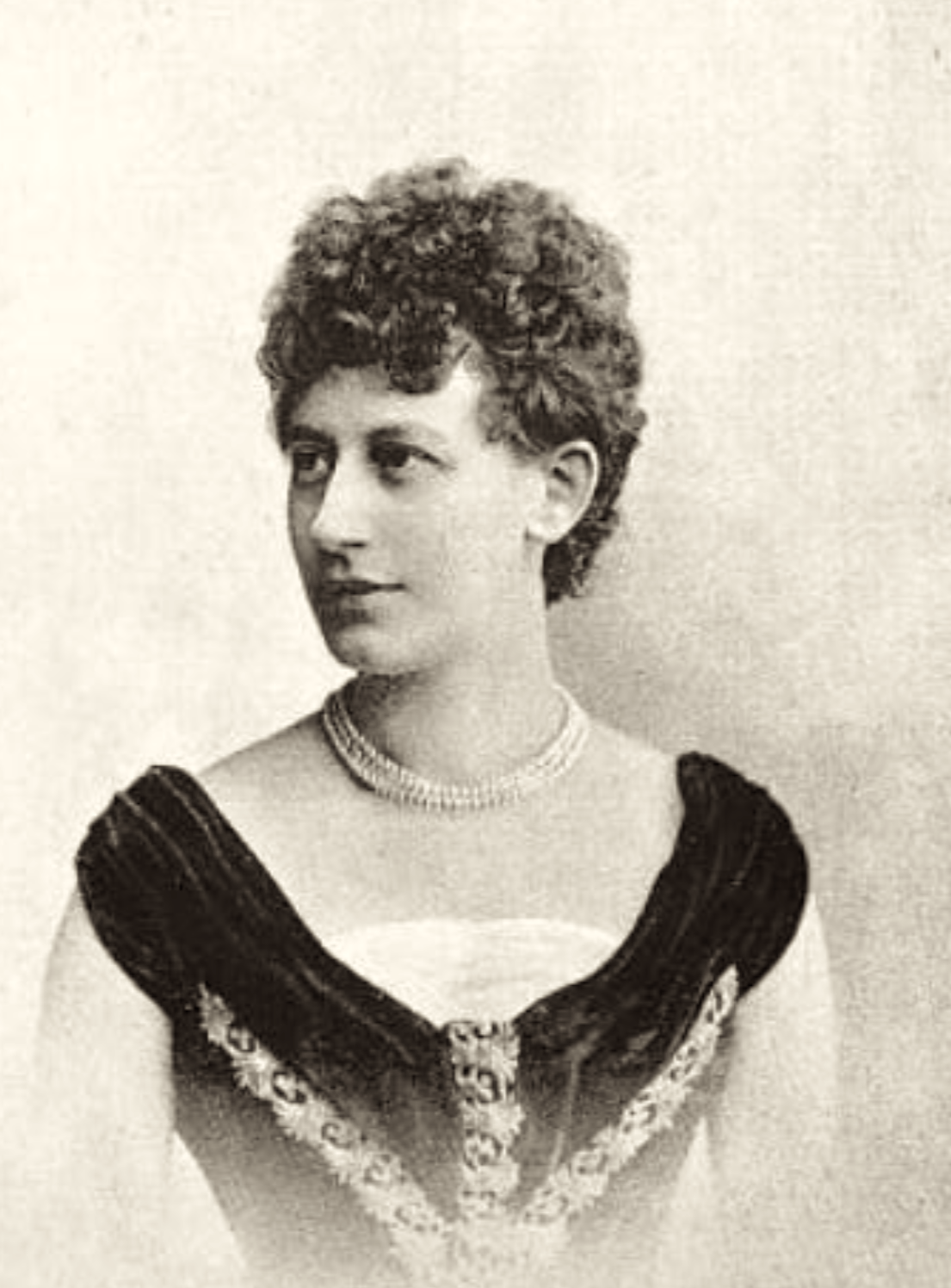
Charlotte Huhn in 1890.

Charlotte Huhn (15 September 1865 – 15 June 1925) was a German operatic contralto.

== Life and career ==
Charlotte Huhn was born in Lüneburg, Germany on 15 September 1865. She was born the youngest of five children in a hairdressing family at 27 Grapengiesserstrasse in Lüneburg. When her father died, one of her brothers took over the hairdressing salon and financed most of the maintenance and education costs. In 1881, the musically gifted Charlotte Therese Caroline Huhn began her vocal studies at the Hochschule für Musik und Tanz Köln. The wife of the mayor of the city of Lüneburg, Marie Gravenhorst, also contributed as a patron to the financing of the music studies.

After graduating from Cologne in 1885, Huhn first performed as a concert singer. She then continued her training in Berlin in 1887 with the private music teacher Julius Hey (1832–1909) and with the singing teacher Mathilde Mallinger (1847–1920). She made her debut in 1889 at the Berlin Kroll Opera as the title character in Gluck's Orpheus. She subsequently made guest appearances at New York's Metropolitan Opera until 1891, where she sang the role of Mary in the world premiere of The Flying Dutchman. In 1890, she took part in Metropolitan Opera guest performances in Chicago and Boston. In 1891, she took part as a concert singer in the Silesian Music Festival in Breslau. She then received an engagement at the Cologne Opera. Huhn said goodbye to Cologne in the title role of Gluck's Orpheus. On 1 October 1895, she went to the Hofoper Dresden. There she appeared in the newly staged opera Circe in 1898.

In a concert in the Gewandhaus Hall in Leipzig on 26 October 1899, Huhn sang Das Meer hat seine Perlen as an encore, composed by Robert Franz (1815–1892) with lyrics by Heinrich Heine. The music critic present, Eduard Bernsdorf (1825–1901) praised the singer for the "warmth of feeling" of her performance as well as the "sonority and apt treatment of her extensive alto (or mezzo-soprano) voice".

She left Dresden in 1902 and was a member of the Hofoper München.

== Main roles ==
Her further stage repertoire at the Court Theatres in Dresden and Munich included roles such as Ortrud in Lohengrin, Fides in Le prophète, Orpheus, Euryanthe and Brangäne in Tristan und Isolde.

== Award and honour ==
- Saxony-Meiningen Golden Medal of Merit for Art and Science
- Naming of a street in Lüneburg after the artist: Charlotte-Huhn-Straße

== Resting place in Lüneburg ==
The artist, who last worked as a singing teacher, died at the age of 59 after a vocal cord operation in Hamburg and found her final resting place in her birthplace at the Michaelis Cemetery.
