= Alfred Muff =

Swiss bass-baritone (born 1949)

Alfred Muff (born 31 May 1949) is a Swiss operatic bass-baritone.

== Life and career ==
Born in Lucerne, Muff studied at the Lucerne conservatory until he was introduced by its director Rudolf Baumgartner to the opera singer and teacher Elisabeth Grümmer, who took him to the Berlin University of the Arts. There he studied for five semesters, at the end with Irmgard Hartmann. In 1973, he began his artistic career at the Luzerner Theater in the role of the Minister in Fidelio. After seven instructive years, his path led him via Linz, Mannheim back to Switzerland to Zurich, where he has been a permanent member of the Zürich Opera House since 1984. As an internationally sought-after singer, he gives guest performances at all the world's important opera houses and concert halls, such as the Vienna State Opera, Musikverein and Konzerthaus in Vienna, Salzburg Festival, Bavarian State Opera, Hamburg, Berlin, Dresden, La Scala in Milan, Opéra Bastille de Paris. Various performances in opera and concert have also taken place in Japan (Tokyo), China, Argentina and America.

In 1993, Muff was awarded the Art and Culture Prize of the City of Lucerne.

== Repertoire ==
Among the outstanding roles in Muff's repertoire are Baron Ochs in Der Rosenkavalier, Hans Sachs in Die Meistersinger von Nürnberg, Gurnemanz in Parsifal, King Marke in Tristan und Isolde, King Heinrich in Lohengrin, Rocco in Fidelio, Sarastro in The Magic Flute and the Water Sprite in Rusalka.

Muff's voice can be heard on recordings of Die Frau ohne Schatten, Der fliegende Holländer, Die Walküre, Die Gezeichneten, Hagadah (oratorio by Paul Dessau, Die Zauberflöte as well as Bruckner's Te Deum and his F minor Mass, as well as on DVDs of the Zurich Opera House in Rosenkavalier, Hänsel and Gretel, Lulu, Die Entführung aus dem Serail, Tannhäuser, Fidelio, Elektra and Peter Grimes.
