= Peter Bloom =

American academic

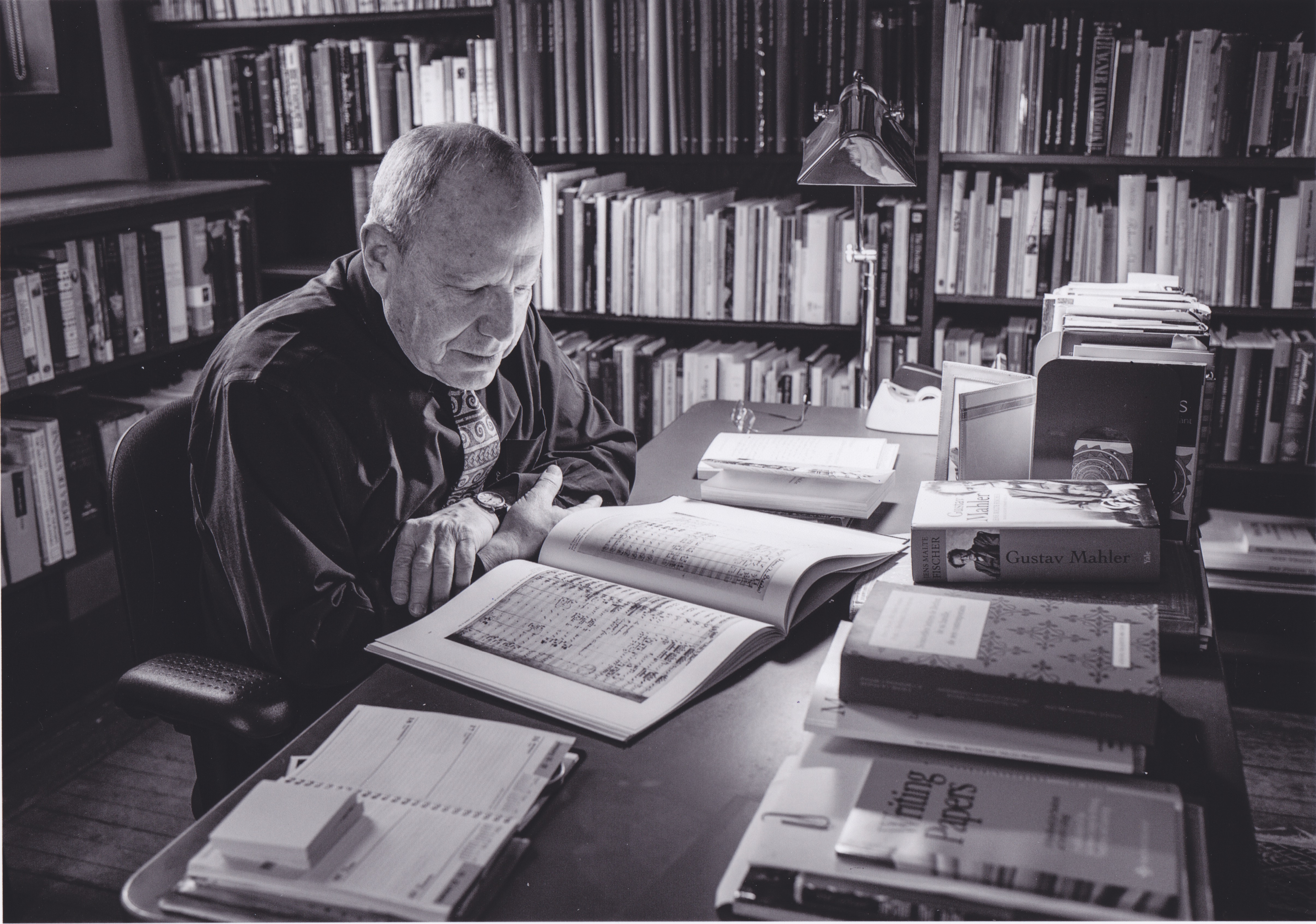
Peter Bloom

Peter Bloom is the Grace Jarcho Ross 1933 Professor of Humanities, Emeritus, at Smith College in Northampton, Massachusetts. He obtained his BA in music at Swarthmore College, his Ph.D. in musicology at the University of Pennsylvania, and studied the oboe with John de Lancie at the Curtis Institute of Music.

Professor Bloom came to Smith College in 1970 and retired in 2017. He specializes in European composers of the 19th century, has published on Robert Schumann, Richard Wagner, and Claude Debussy, but is best known for his books, editions, and essays on the life and work of Hector Berlioz. He is an editor of Berlioz's complete correspondence and complete music criticism; his new edition of Les Mémoires d'Hector Berlioz appeared from the Librairie philosophique J. Vrin, Paris, in 2019.

Bloom organized international conferences on Berlioz and his era in 1982 and 2000 (at Smith College). From 1997 to 2003 he was a member of the Paris-based Comité international Hector Berlioz that sponsored five international conferences to celebrate the two-hundredth anniversary of the composer's birth and among other things attempted to have Berlioz's remains transferred from the Montmartre Cemetery in Paris to the Panthéon, which honors "les grands hommes" of the French Nation. Then-President of France Jacques Chirac, after initially agreeing to the transfer, changed his mind.

In March 2012, Bloom was an adviser to "Debussy's Paris: Art, Music, & Sounds of the City," an aural and visual art exhibit at the Smith College Museum of Art on composer Claude Debussy and Paris during the Belle Epoque. In 2016, for his work on Berlioz, he was presented with the medal of The Berlioz Society, London.

Peter Bloom Smith College faculty biography and list of publications: http://www.smith.edu/music/faculty_bloom.php
