= Rosa von Milde =

German operatic soprano (1827–1906)

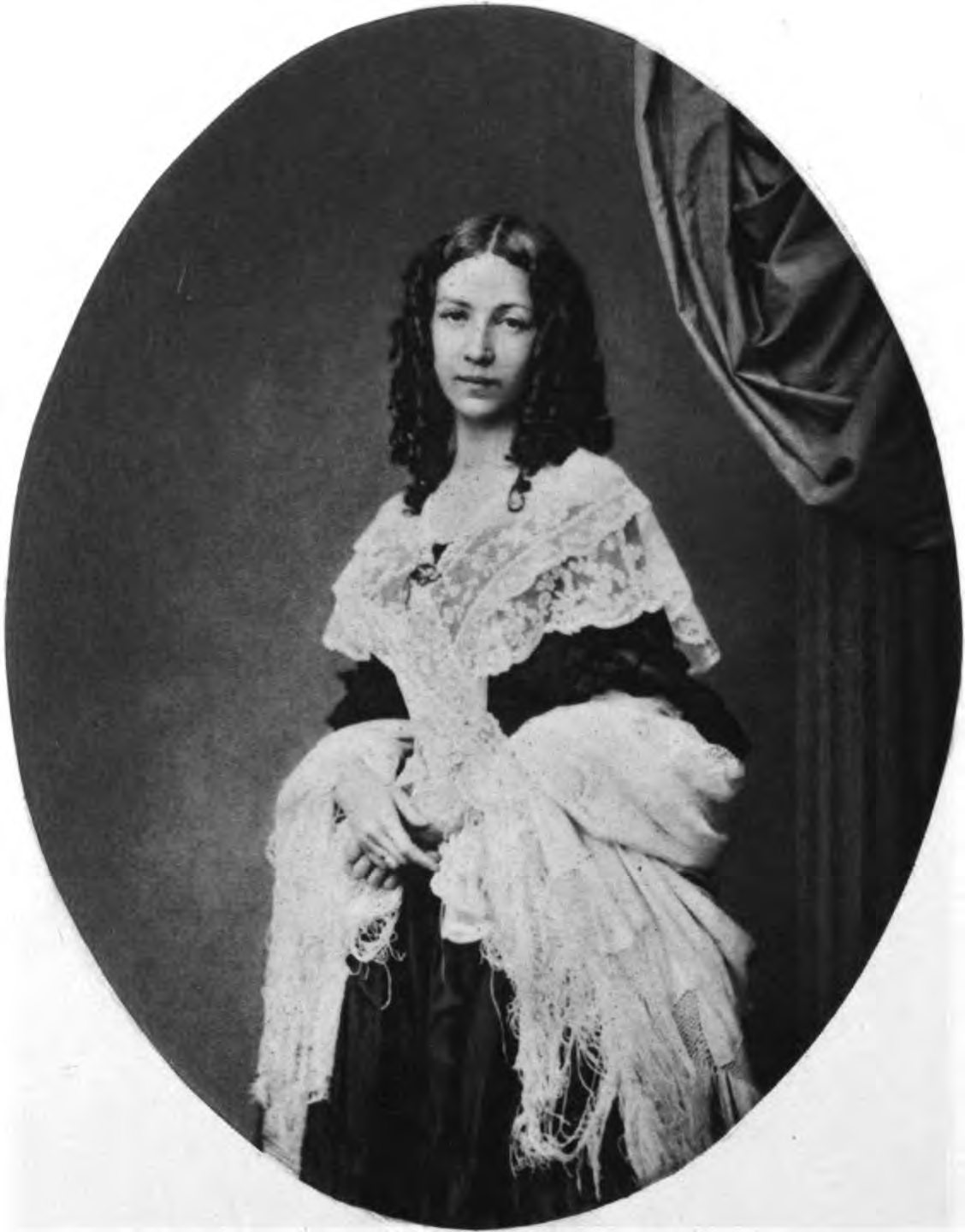
- Rosa von Milde in 1857
- Born: Rosalie Agthe; 25 June 1827; Weimar, Germany
- Died: 25 January 1906 (aged 78); Weimar, Germany
- Occupation: Operatic soprano
- Organizations: Weimar Court Theatre
- Spouse: Hans von Milde (m. 1851; died 1899)

Rosa von Milde, also Rosalie von Milde, née Rosa Agthe (25 June 1827 – 25 January 1906) was a German operatic soprano and voice teacher. She was a leading singer at the Weimar Court Theatre from 1848 to 1867, which flourished when Franz Liszt directed it. She created, among others, the roles of Elsa in Wagner's Lohengrin, conducted by Liszt in 1850, and Margiana in Der Barbier von Bagdad by Peter Cornelius in 1858.

== Life ==
Agthe was born on 25 June 1827 into a music-loving family in Weimar. Her father Friedrich Wilhelm Agthe, (Note: Ludwig Eisenberg writes "born 25 June 1827 in Weimar, daughter of a grand ducal chamber musician", p. 677. This applies, even without a specific name, to Friedrich Wilhelm Agthe. Here he gives Rosa Agthe's birth name clearly incorrectly as 'Gathe'.) a chamber musician, gave her piano lessons at a young age. When her singing talent was recognised, she took voice lessons for three years with the tenor Franz Götze (1814–1888). On 9 June 1845, she made her stage debut at the Weimarer Hoftheater (Weimar Court Theatre) as Amina in Bellini's La sonnambula.

She made her official debut as a permanent singer at the Hoftheater in September 1848 in the title role of Louis Spohr's Jessonda. She had great success with roles in Richard Wagner's stage works. She appeared as Elisabeth in Tannhäuser. On 28 August 1850, she performed as Elsa in Lohengrin in the work's world premiere, conducted by Franz Liszt. Her future husband, the baritone Hans Feodor von Milde, performed as Telramund. Liszt commented:

Fräulein von Agthe, von Natur vollkommen für die Darstellung der Elsa geeignet, hat ihre seraphischen Gesänge mit dem reinsten Verständnis der poetischen und musikalischen Intention ausgeführt.
Fräulein von Agthe, by nature perfectly suited for the portrayal of Elsa, performed her seraphic singing with the purest understanding of the poetic and musical intention.

The couple married in 1851. They had two children, Franz von Milde and Rudolf von Milde (1859–1927), who also became singers, and an adopted daughter, Natalie von Milde. The couple often appeared together on stage, for example in 1852 as Teresa and Fieramosca in the first German production of Benvenuto Cellini by Berlioz, in an arrangement by Liszt. In 1854, Milde participated in the world premieres of both Heinrich Dorn's Die Nibelungen and Schubert's Alfonso und Estrella. She created the role of Margiana in Der Barbier von Bagdad by Peter Cornelius in 1858. Cornelius dedicated his composition 12 Sonette für Rosa von Milde to her in 1859. On 21 May 1865, she created the role of Chimene in his Der Cid, while her husband appeared as Ruy Diaz.

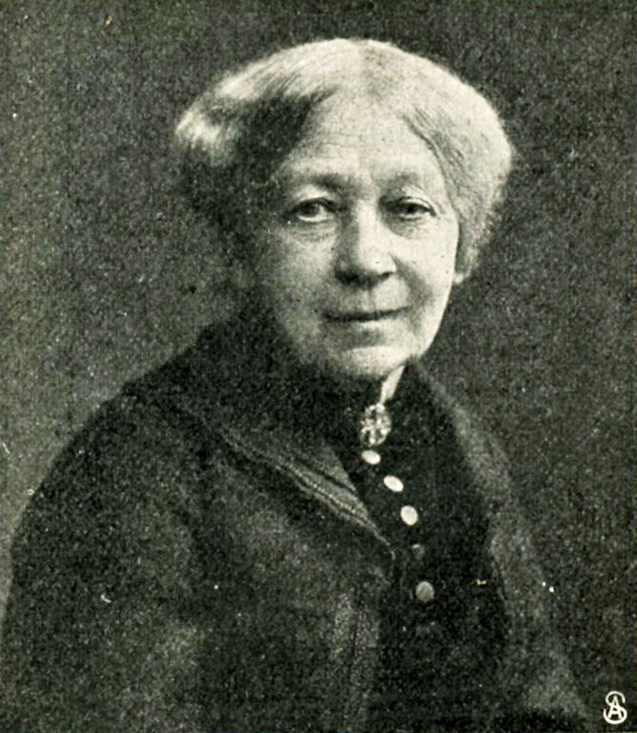
Rosa von Milde ca. 1905

In 1867, Rosa von Milde took her leave from the Weimar stage. The reason was personal differences between her and the new artistic director Franz von Dingelstedt. She then worked as a voice teacher and from 1876 at the Weimarer Musikschule.

Rosa von Milde died in Weimar on 25 January 1906 at the age of 78.
