= Lope Recio Loynaz =

Cuban general

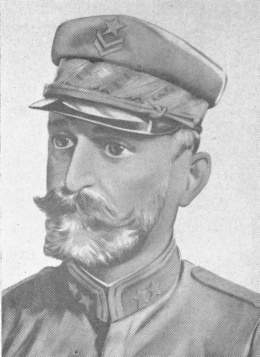
Lope Recio Loynaz

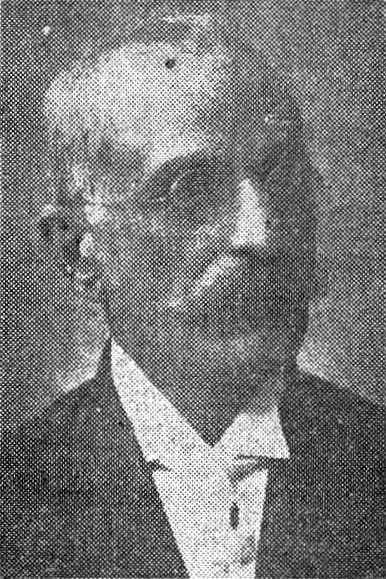

Lope Recio Loynaz (Camagüey, August 23, 1860 - July 24, 1927) was a Cuban Division general and politician. He participated in the Cuban War of Independence and was Governor of Camagüey.

== Biography ==
Recio started his military career in 1895 when he joined the forces of Máximo Gomez. He participated in the First Eastern Campaign. In 1898 he was promoted to the rank of Division general in charge of the 3rd division of the Ejercito Libertador.

During the United States Military Government in Cuba he was appointed Governor of the Province of Camagüey and later won the 1901 elections for that office. After the Republic of Cuba was established, Recio was re-elected Governor of Camagüey in 1905.

== Legacy ==
In Florida an Escuela Secundaria is named after Recio.
