= Hans von Milde =

Austrian opera singer

Hans Feodor von Milde
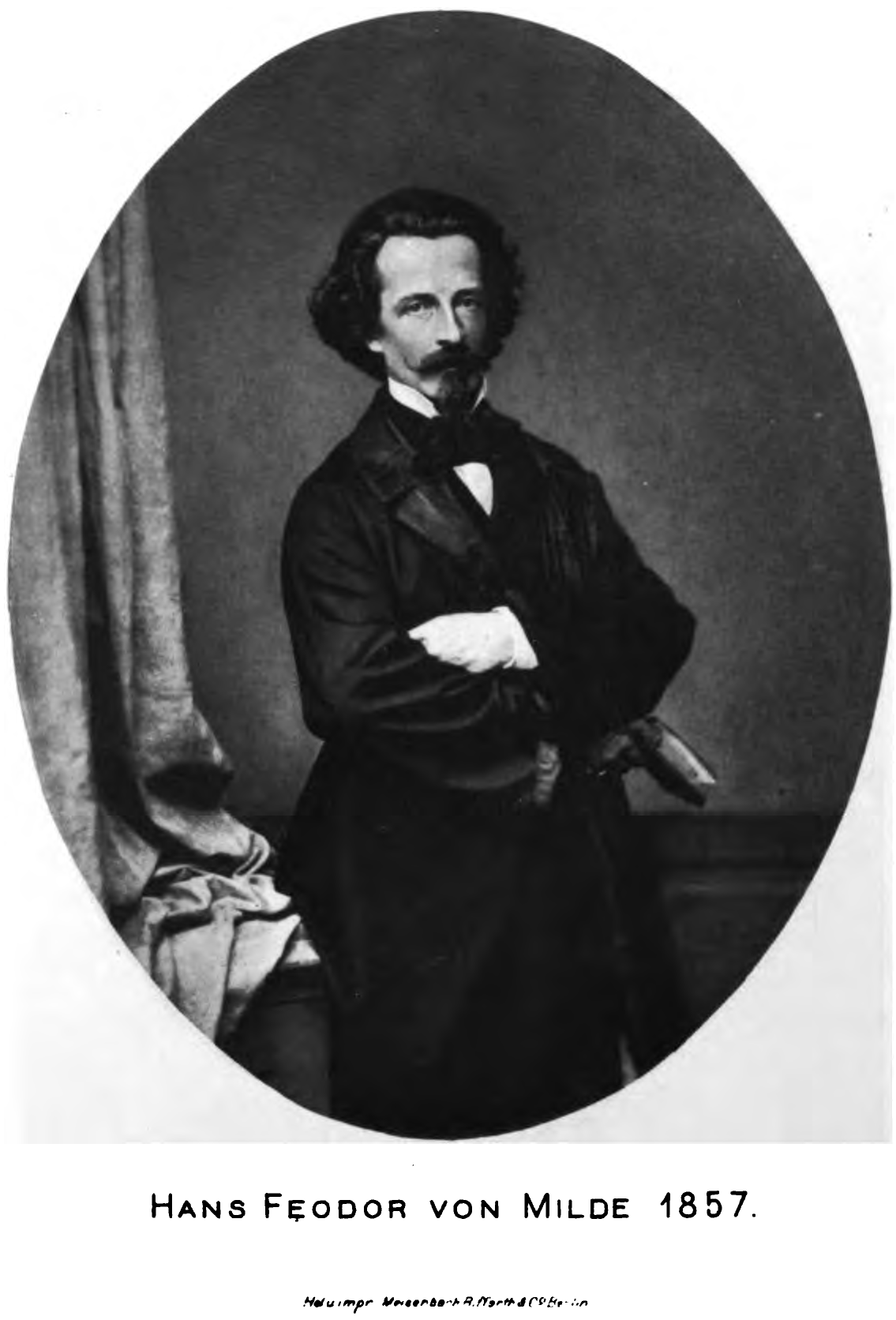
- Hans von Milde in 1857
- Born: 13 April 1821; Petronell, Austrian Empire
- Died: 10 December 1899 (aged 78); Weimar, German Empire
- Occupation: Operatic baritone
- Organizations: Weimar court opera

Hans Feodor von Milde (13 April 1821 – 10 December 1899) was an Austrian operatic baritone and the husband of the soprano Rosa von Milde (née Agthe). He sang for almost four decades at the court opera in Weimar where he particularly excelled in the works of Richard Wagner. For many years, Milde sang under the direction of Franz Liszt, notably creating the role of Telramund in the world premiere of Richard Wagner's Lohengrin under his baton. He sang in several other notable premieres, including singing the role of the High Priest in the first stage performance of Camille Saint-Saëns's Samson et Dalila in 1877.

== Biography ==
Von Milde was born in Petronell, near Vienna, the son of an administrator for Prince Gusztáv Batthyány. He initially planned to study law in Vienna but ultimately ended up studying singing under Franz Hauser and later under the younger Manuel García in Paris. In 1845, he began his opera career at the Weimar court opera where he remained as a member of the company for his entire career under a lifetime contract. He developed a friendship, both professionally and personally, with Franz Liszt who led the opera performances there from 1848-1858. He notably sang Telramund in the world premiere of Richard Wagner's Lohengrin in 1850 under Liszt's baton. He sang several other Wagner roles with Liszt, including the title role in Der fliegende Holländer, Hans Sachs in Die Meistersinger von Nürnberg, and Kurwenal in Tristan und Isolde.

In 1851, von Milde married the soprano Rosa Agthe, with whom he had shared the stage many times. They had two sons Franz von Milde (1855–1929) and Rudolf von Milde (1859–1927), both of whom became successful opera singers. In 1852 von Milde portrayed Fieramosca in the premiere of Liszt's revised version of Hector Berlioz’s Benvenuto Cellini and his wife sang the role of Teresa. The couple also notably sang in the world premieres of Heinrich Dorn's Die Nibelungen on 22 January 1854, Franz Schubert's Alfonso und Estrella on 24 June 1854, Peter Cornelius's Der Barbier von Bagdad on 15 December 1858 and Cornelius's Der Cid in 1865. Hans also sang the High Priest in the first stage performance of Samson et Dalila, at Weimar (1877).

Both Hans and his wife retired from the opera stage in Weimar in 1884 and they both began working as singing teachers. Their son Franz published a biography about his parents (Ein ideales Künstlerehepaar, Rosa und Feodor von Milde. Ihre Kunst und ihre Zeit) in 1918. Music historian Carlo Droste also wrote a book on the von Milde family (Die Familie von Milde) which was published in 1907.
