= Sieghart Döhring =

Sieghart Döhring (born 12 December 1939) is a German musicologist and Opera researcher.

== Career ==
Born in Biskupiec, East Prussia, Döhring studied musicology, theology and philosophy in Hamburg and Marburg/Lahn. In 1969 he gained a doctorate at the University of Marburg. From 1983 to 2006 he was head of the Forschungsinstitut für Musiktheater in Schloss Thurnau at the University of Bayreuth.

Döhring's research mainly concerns music theatre. Together with Carl Dahlhaus he published Piper's Encyclopedia of Music Theatre from 1986 to 1997.

Döhring is married to the musicologist and opera researcher Sabine Henze-Döhring.

== Publications ==
- Formgeschichte der Opernarie vom Ausgang des achtzehnten bis zur Mitte des neunzehnten Jahrhunderts. Itzehoe: George 1975.
- Giacomo Meyerbeer. Große Oper als Ideendrama. Habilitationsschrift (mschr.) Technische Universität Berlin 1987.
- Oper und Musikdrama im 19. Jahrhundert (together with Sabine Henze-Döhring). (Handbuch der musikalischen Gattungen, vol. 13) Laaber: Laaber-Verlag 1997.

== Festschriften in honour of Döhring ==
- Opernedition. Bericht über das Symposion [1999] zum 60. Geburtstag von Sieghart Döhring. Edited by Helga Lühning and Reinhard Wiesend in cooperation with Peter Niedermüller and Katja Schmidt-Wistoff. Mainz: Are-Edition 2005 (Schriften zur Musikwissenschaft, Vol. 12).
- Bühnenklänge: Festschrift für Sieghart Döhring zum 65. Geburtstag. Edited by Thomas Betzwieser, Daniel Brandenburg, Rainer Franke, Arnold Jacobshagen, Marion Linhardt, Stephanie Schroedter and Thomas Steiert. Munich: Ricordi 2005.
