= Turandot (Busoni) =

- Opera by Ferruccio Busoni
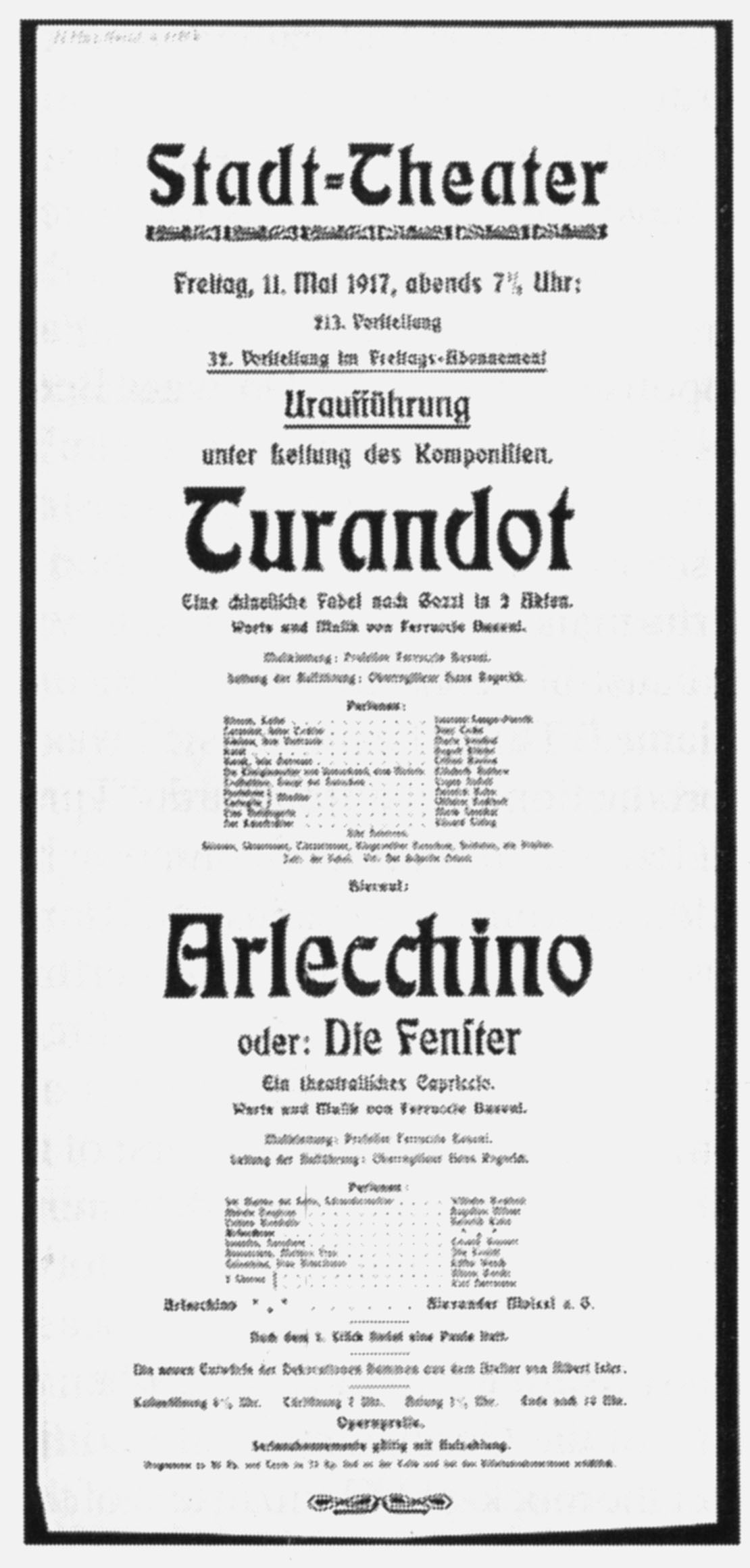
- Poster for the premiere
- Librettist: Ferruccio Busoni
- Language: German
- Based on: Carlo Gozzi's play Turandot
- Premiere: 11 May 1917; Zürich Opera House

Turandot (BV 273) is a 1917 opera with spoken dialogue and in two acts by Ferruccio Busoni. Busoni prepared his own libretto, in German, based on the play of the same name by Count Carlo Gozzi. The music for Busoni's opera is based on the incidental music, and the associated Turandot Suite (BV 248), which Busoni had written in 1905 for a production of Gozzi's play. The opera is often performed as part of a double bill with Busoni's earlier one-act opera Arlecchino.

== Composition of the music for Turandot ==
=== Source and previous versions ===
Carlo Gozzi's play Turandot first appeared in 1762. It was originally written to be performed in the small theatre of San Samuele in Venice, and was deliberately written in the Commedia dell'arte style as a reaction to the more modern, realistic plays of Goldoni and others.

Schiller made an adapted translation of Turandot which was published in 1802. Weber wrote his Incidental music for Turandot, Op. 37, for a production of this play. It was composed in 1809 and included the earlier Overtura cinese ("Chinese Overture"), which he had composed on a Chinese theme in 1805. Busoni thought that between them Schiller and Weber had ruined a masterpiece of Italian literature.

=== Incidental music and orchestral suite ===
Gozzi's Turandot – in one form or another – occupied Busoni at various times in the years 1904–1917. He was very fond of fantastical and magical tales: his immediately preceding work was the Piano Concerto, Op. 39 BV247, which included music from an unfinished adaptation of Adam Oehlenschläger's Aladdin. In 1904 Busoni began sketching incidental music for Gozzi's Chinese fable. He also arranged a concert suite, which was first performed in 1905 and published in 1906. A production of Gozzi's play with Busoni's music was mounted by Max Reinhardt in Berlin in 1911, and for the second and last time in London in 1913. For more information on the composition of the incidental music and the suite, and the productions of the play with Busoni's music, see the article on the Turandot Suite.

=== Composition of the opera ===
After the outbreak of World War I, Busoni, as an Italian, found it increasingly difficult to stay in Berlin and eventually moved to neutral Zürich where he did not have to take sides. Between late 1915 and August 1916 he was occupied with writing his one-act opera Arlecchino, but the Stadttheater (municipal theatre) in Zürich was unwilling to mount a production without a companion piece. He swiftly wrote a libretto in German based on Gozzi's original and adapted his Turandot Suite into a short two-act opera with some spoken dialogue. Busoni wrote to Egon Petri on 9 November 1916:

The important question as to which piece should be coupled with the hour-long Arlecchino so as to fill an evening, my resultant difficulties and the desire to establish such a programme in a durably valid form have led me to the hasty decision to form an opera in two acts out of the material and substance of Turandot. For a few weeks now I have been hard at work on this delightful task, writing the libretto and music for a Turandot opera. I am re-writing the text completely and independently, and bringing it closer in tone to a pantomime or stage play. It is a more arduous task than I had initially assumed, but it is coming easily to me. The masque-figures common to both pieces serve to link them (although they otherwise contrast completely with each other).

Busoni completed the opera Turandot in double-quick time (300 pages in 100 days) in late 1916, and it was first performed with Arlecchino as a double bill – Busoni conducting – in Zürich in 1917. Dent mentions how pleased Busoni was with his own workmanship.

There are various oddities in Busoni's libretto which recall the play's Commedia dell'arte roots: characters with Italian names like Truffaldino and Pantalone; Allah is praised in China; and there are references to Venice, St. Mark's, and gondolas. The spoken dialogue harks back to Mozart's operas, especially The Magic Flute. In comparison to Puccini's opera on the same subject, Busoni retains the intimate, unreal atmosphere of Gozzi's play. Busoni's princess Turandot is not quite so implacable; her heart is readier to melt.

=== Composer's revisions ===
Re-using some of the material he had composed for the opera, Busoni again revised the orchestral Turandot Suite in 1917, replacing the Funeral March of the last movement with Altoum's Warning, BV 248b. Busoni also separately published Altoums Gebet from Act 2 (newly written for the opera) as Altoum's Prayer, BV 277 op. 49 no. 1 for baritone and small orchestra.

== Performance history ==
The premiere performance of Busoni's Turandot took place on 11 May 1917 at the Stadttheater Zürich. The producer was Hans Rogorsch, and the designer, Albert Isler. Busoni's one-act opera, Arlecchino, was also performed as part of a double-bill.

Turandot and Arlecchino were first performed in Germany on 20 October 1918 in Frankfurt with Gustav Brecher as the conductor, and again beginning on 26 January 1919 at the Cologne opera, conducted by Otto Klemperer, who had recently been appointed as "First Conductor." The two operas were performed in Berlin on 19 May 1921 at the Berliner Staatsoper under the baton of the Wagnerian conductor Leo Blech, with considerable success.

The first performance in Italy (without Arlecchino) was on 29 November 1936 in Rome, conducted by Fernando Previtali. Previtali, a Busoni champion, went on to conduct performances in other Italian cities and conducted the premiere of the opera at the Teatro Colón in Buenos Aires in 1964.

The first performance in England was in London on 19 August 1966, in an English translation by Lionel Salter. The performance was broadcast on the BBC Third Programme. The American premiere was a concert performance on 10 October 1967 in New York's Philharmonic Hall, followed by a semi-staged version on 28 January 1980 at the First Presbyterian Church in Berkeley, California, conducted by the 28-year-old Kent Nagano; a fully staged performance was given on 15 November 1986 by the Connecticut Grand Opera in Stamford with Gregory Stapp as Emperor Altoum, Juan Luque Carmona as Calaf, and Patricia Craig in the title role.

== Roles ==
Role	Voice type	Premiere cast, 11 May 1917 (Conductor: Ferruccio Busoni)
Altoum, emperor	bass	Laurenz Saeger-Pieroth
Turandot, his daughter	soprano	Inez Encke
Adelma, her confidante	mezzo-soprano	Marie Smeikal
Kalaf	tenor	August Richter
Barak, his servant	baritone	Tristan Rawson
Queen mother of Samarkand, a Moor	soprano	Elisabeth Rabbow
Truffaldino, chief eunuch	tenor	Eugen Nusselt
Pantalone, minister	bass	Heinrich Kuhn
Tartaglia, minister	bass	Wilhelm Bockholt
A singer	mezzo-soprano	Marie Smeikal
The executioner	silent	Eduard Siding
Eight doctors, chorus of slaves, dancers, mourners, eunuchs, soldiers

== Instrumentation ==
3 flutes (3rd doubling piccolo), 3 oboes (3rd doubling English horn), 3 clarinets (3rd doubling bass clarinet), 3 bassoons (3rd doubling contrabassoon); 4 horns, 4 trumpets, 3 trombones, 1 tuba; timpani, percussion (glockenspiel, triangle, tambourine, covered drum, bass drum, tam-tam); 2 harps; soloists, chorus; strings.

== Synopsis ==
Busoni greatly simplified Gozzi's 5-act play into an opera of two acts of two scenes each. However, the basic plot is the same. Turandot, daughter of the Emperor, challenges all suitors for her hand with three riddles. She will marry the one who answers correctly, but those who fail are executed. Kalaf, an exiled prince in disguise, takes up the challenge.

=== Act 1 ===
Scene 1:

Kalaf comes upon the picture discarded by an earlier executed suitor, and determines to win Turandot.

Scene 2:

Emperor Altoum complains of Turandot's intransigence. Kalaf says he would rather die than fail to win Turandot. Turandot enters with her maid Adelma who recognises the Prince, but remains silent. Kalaf correctly answers the three riddles, and challenges Turandot to discover his name and parentage; if she does so, he will depart.

=== Act 2 ===
Scene 1:

Slave girls dance to a wordless choral version of "Greensleeves". Turandot confesses her mixed feelings for the Prince. Adelma says she knows the Prince's name, and will tell Turandot if she can have her freedom; Turandot agrees.

Scene 2:

Turandot announces Kalaf's name to general consternation, and he makes ready to depart. But Turandot stops him, saying he has awakened her heart. The work closes with a final ensemble 'Was ist das alle Menschen bindet?' ("What is it that rules all men?") to which is the reply 'Die Liebe' ("Love").

== Recordings ==
Busoni: Arlecchino & Turandot – Chorus & Orchestra of the Opéra de Lyon

- Conductor: Kent Nagano
- Principal singers: Mechthild Gessendorf (Turandot); Stefan Dahlberg (Kalaf); Franz-Josef Selig (Altoum); Gabriele Sima (Adelma); Falk Struckman (Barak); Anne-Marie Rodde (Queen Mother); Markus Schäfer (Truffaldino); Michael Kraus (Pantalone); Wolfgang Holzmair (Tartaglia)
- Label: Virgin Classics VCD7 59313-2 (2 CDs)

Busoni: Turandot – Berlin Radio Symphony Orchestra

- Conductor: Gerd Albrecht
- Principal singers: René Pape (Altoum); Linda Plech (Turandot); Gabriele Schreckenbach (Adelma); Josef Protschka (Kalaf); Friedrich Molsberger (Barak); Celina Lindsley (Queen Mother); Robert Wörle (Truffaldino); Johannes Werner Prein (Pantalone); Gotthold Schwarz (Tartaglia)
- Label: Capriccio 60 039-1 (1 CD)

== Other versions of the Turandot story ==
Puccini had heard about the 1911 Max Reinhardt production of Gozzi's play with Busoni's incidental music, and this may have played a role in his decision to write his own version. Andrea Maffei (who also wrote the libretto for Verdi's I Masnadieri) had translated his friend Schiller's version of Gozzi's play back into Italian. The librettists for Puccini's Turandot, Adami and Simoni, used Maffei's translation, but also turned to Gozzi's original. In addition they made reference to the libretto by Gazzoletti for a little-known opera Turanda by Antonio Bazzini, who had been one of Puccini's teachers at the Milan Conservatory. As a result, the libretto for Puccini's opera differs considerably from Gozzi's play. Ashbrook and Powers note that several skillful changes in the 'falling action' of the plot (Busoni's Act 2) enabled Busoni to avoid the pitfalls which plagued Puccini's attempt to set Act 3 of his version of the story.

Bertolt Brecht also prepared a version of the story (1953–54).

== Detailed list of performances ==
The information in this list is from Roberge, unless otherwise noted.
- 11 May 1917; Zürich; Stadttheater; Ferruccio Busoni, conductor; Inez Encke, Turandot; August Richter, Kalaf; Laurenz Saeger-Pieroth, Altoum; premiere; double-bill with Arlecchino; see Performance history above for more detail.
- 20 October 1918; Frankfurt; Oper Frankfurt; Gustav Brecher, conductor; Else Gentner-Fischer, Turandot; Erik Wirl, Kalaf; Hans Erl, Altoum; first performance in Germany; double-bill with Arlecchino.
- 26 January 1919; Cologne; Cologne Opera; Otto Klemperer, conductor; double-bill with Arlecchino.
- 1920; Saarbrücken; double-bill with Arlecchino; no further details.
- 19 May 1921; Berlin; Berlin State Opera; Leo Blech, conductor; Lola Artôt de Padilla, Turandot; double-bill with Arlecchino.
- 8 January 1922; Berlin; double-bill with Arlecchino; no further details.
- 1925; Mainz; no further details.
- 1926; Leipzig; Oper Leipzig; double-bill with Arlecchino, conducted by Oskar Braun.
- 1928; Wiesbaden; no further details.
- 1930; Königsberg; Ludwig, conductor; no further details.
- 4 October 1930; Mannheim; Nationaltheater Mannheim; Ernst Cremer, conductor; Else Schulz, Turandot; Helmut Neugebauer, Kalaf; Wilhelm Fenton, Altoum.
- 29 November 1936; Rome; Auditorium EIAR; Fernando Previtali, conductor; Gabriella Gatti, Turandot; Piero Pauli, Kalaf; Gregorio Pasetti, Altoum; concert version?; first performance in Italy.
- 18 May 1940; Florence; Teatro della Pergola; Fernando Previtali, conductor; Maria Carbone, Turandot; Alessandro Ziliani, Kalaf; Alfredo Coletta, Altoum.
- 7 March 1942; Rome; Teatro Reale del Opera; Fernando Previtali, conductor; Maria Carbone, Turandot; Aurelio Marcato, Kalaf; Giulio Neri, Altoum.
- 12 January 1947; London (broadcast?); Nordwestdeutscher Rundfunk; Philipp Jarnach, conductor; Klara Ebers, Turandot; Wilhelm Lückert, Kalaf; Theo Herman, Altoum; first performance in Germany after the war.
- 28 October 1947; Hamburg; Hamburgische Staatsoper; Arthur Grüber, conductor; Helene Werth, Turandot; Helmut Melchert, Kalaf; Sigmund Roth, Altoum.
- 21 January 1953; Rome; Auditorium RAI; Fernando Previtali, conductor; Magda László, Turandot; Amadeo Berdini, Kalaf; Antonio Cassinelli, Altoum; first performance in Italy after the war.
- 5 December 1953; Naples; Teatro San Carlo; Gianandrea Gavazzeni, conductor; Anna de Cavalieri, Turandot; Giuseppe Campora, Kalaf; Raffaele Ariè, Altoum.
- 1958; Landestheater Darmstadt; Hans Zanotelli, conductor; Ursula Lippman, Turandot; double-bill with Arlecchino.
- 10 December 1959; Hamburg; Norddeutscher Rundfunk; Wolfgang Ebert, conductor; Edith Lang, Turandot; Heinz Hoppe, Kalaf; Ernst Wiemann, Altoum.
- 6 May 1961; Geneva; Teatro Carlo Felice; Franco Capuana, conductor; Anna de Cavalieri, Turandot; Renato Cioni, Kalaf; Paolo Montarsolo, Altoum.
- 17 February 1962; Milan; La Scala; Nino Sanzogno, conductor; Raina Kabaivanska, Turandot; Renato Cioni, Kalaf; Nicola Zaccaria, Altoum; Italian translation by Oriana Previtali.
- 14 August 1964; Buenos Aires; Teatro Colón; Fernando Previtali, conductor; Margherita Roberti, Turandot; Carlo Cossutta, Kalaf; Jorge Algorta, Altoum; first performance outside Europe.
- 1965; Berlin?
- 1966; Zweites Deutsches Fernsehen
- 1966; Hamburg; double-bill with Arlecchino.
- 1 February 1966; Berlin; Deutsche Oper Berlin; Giuseppe Patané, conductor; Annabelle Bernard, Turandot; Ernst Haefliger, Kalaf; Ivan Sardi, Altoum.
- 19 April 1966; London; BBC.
- 19 August 1966; London; BBC Third Programme (Broadcast performance); Lawrence Leonard, conductor; Pauline Tinsley, Turandot; John Mitchinson, Kalaf; first performance in England.
- 19 January 1967; Turin; Auditorium RAI; Mario Rossi, conductor; Floriana Cavalli, Turandot; Herbert Handt, Kalaf; Ferruccio Mazzoli, Altoum.
- 10 October 1967; New York City; Philharmonic Hall; Little Orchestra Society; Thomas Scherman, conductor; Hanne-Lore Kuhse, Turandot; William Brown, Kalaf; Guus Hoekman, Altoum; concert version; first performance in the United States.
- 13 November 1967; Cologne; Westdeutscher Rundfunk; Mario Rossi, conductor; Charlotte Berthold, Turandot; Eberhard Katz, Kalaf; Eduard Wollitz, Altoum.
- 8 March 1969; Stockholm; first performance in Sweden.
- 27 March 1973; Venice; La Fenice; Ettore Gracis, conductor; Virginia Zeani, Turandot; Angelo Mori, Kalaf; Mario Rinaudo/Lorenzo Gaetani, Altoum.
- 1978 (before May); London; Abbey Opera; Cockpit Theatre.
- 28 January 1980; Berkeley, California; First Presbyterian Church; Berkeley Promenade Orchestra; Kent Nagano, conductor; Betsy Bell Taylor, Turandot; Jeffrey Carney, Kalaf; William De Valentine, Altoum; semi-staged version; colloquial translation by Ross Halper.
- 24 April 1980; Theater Trier; Rainer Baum, conductor; Hara Savino, Turandot; Antonis J. Constantino, Kalaf; Nick Herbosch, Altoum; double-bill with Arlecchino.
- 7 November 1985; Frankfurt am Main; Hessischer Rundfunk (Rundfunk-Konzerte in der Alten Oper); Sabine Hass, Turandot; Josef Protschka, Kalaf; Harald Stamm, Altoum; concert version.
- 15 November 1986; Connecticut Grand Opera and Stamford State Opera; Laurence Gilgore, conductor; Patricia Craig, Turandot; Juan Luque Carmona, Kalaf; Gregory Strapp, Altoum; repeated on 22 November 1986 in Bridgeport.
- 23 October 1988; Wexford; Wexford Festival; Simon Joly, conductor; Kristine Ciesinski, Turandot; Milan Voldrich, Kalaf; Norman Bailey, Altoum; first performance in Ireland.
- 11 November 1988; Oberhausen; Theater Oberhausen; Thomas Modos, conductor; Martha Winkelmann, Turandot; Max Voigt, Kalaf; Gottfried Driesch, Altoum.
- 06 February 2010; Sevilla; Teatro de la Maestranza; Pedro Halffter, conductor; concert version
- 9 March 2011; Dijon; Opéra de Dijon; Daniel Kawka, conductor;
- 27 July 2012; Lisbon; St. Charles' Theatre; Moritz Gnann, conductor; Sónia Alcobaça, Turandot; Mário João Alves, Kalaf; Nuno Dias, Altoum; concert version.

== Bibliography ==
- Ambros, August Wilhelm (1862). Geschichte der Musik, Vol. 1. Breslau: F.E.C. Leuckhart. Google Books: Full Preview. Accessed 24 September 2009.
- Ashbrook, William; Powers, Harold (1991). Puccini's Turandot: The End of the Great Tradition, Ch II, pp. 56–58. Princeton: Princeton University Press. ISBN 0-691-02712-9.
- Beaumont, Antony (1985). Busoni the Composer. London: Faber and Faber. ISBN 0-571-13149-2.
- Beaumont, Antony, ed. (1987). Busoni: Selected Letters. New York: Columbia University Press. ISBN 0-231-06460-8.
- Carter, Huntly (1914). The Theatre of Max Reinhardt. New York: Mitchell Kennerley. Archive.org OCR text. Accessed 24 September 2009.
- Couling, Della (2005). Ferruccio Busoni: A musical Ishmael. Lanham, MD: Scarecrow Press. ISBN 0-8108-5142-3.
- Dent, Edward J. (1933). Ferruccio Busoni: A Biography. London: Oxford University Press. (Reprint: London: Ernst Eulenberg, 1974. ISBN 0-903873-02-8.)
- Kindermann, Jürgen (1980). Thematisch-chronologisches Verzeichnis der Werke von Ferruccio B. Busoni. Studien zur Musikgeschichte des 19. Jahrhunderts, vol. 19. Regensburg: Gustav Bosse Verlag. ISBN 3-7649-2033-5.
- Ley, Rosamond, translator (1938). Ferruccio Busoni: Letters to His Wife. London: Edward Arnold & Co.
- Lo, Kii-Ming (1994). Kii-Ming Lo, Ping, Pong, Pang. Die Gestalten der Commedia dell'arte in Busonis und Puccinis »Turandot«-Opern, in Peter Csobádi, Ulrich Müller et al. (eds.), Die lustige Person auf der Bühne, Anif/Salzburg (Müller-Speiser) 1994, pp. 311–323.
- Lo, Kii-Ming (1996). Kii-Ming Lo, Turandot auf der Opernbühne, Frankfurt/Bern/New York (Peter Lang) 1996, ISBN 3-631-42578-3.
- Lo, Kii-Ming (2004). Kii-Ming Lo, Zur Entstehungsgeschichte von Ferruccio Busonis »Turandot«-Werkgruppe und ihrer musiktheatralischen Ästhetik, in Albrecht Riethmüller/Hyesu Shin (eds.), Busoni in Berlin. Facetten eines kosmopolitischen Komponisten, Stuttgart (Franz Steiner) 2004, pp. 143–175.
- Lo, Kii-Ming/Maehder, Jürgen (2004). Kii-Ming Lo/Jürgen Maehder, Turandot de tui bian [The Transformations of »Turandot«], Taipei (Gao Tan Publishing Co.) 2004, ISBN 986-7542-50-9..
- Roberge, Marc-André (1991). Ferruccio Busoni: a bio-bibliography. New York: Greenwood Press. ISBN 0-313-25587-3.
- Schiller, Friedrich (1802). Turandot, Prinzessin von China. Ein tragicomisches Märchen nach Gozzi. Tübingen: J. G. Cotta'schen Buchhandlung. Google Books: Full preview. Accessed 19 September 2009.
- Vollmöller, Karl (1911). Turandot chinesisches Märchenspiel von Carlo Gozzi; Deutsch von Karl Vollmoeller. Berlin: S. Fischer.
- Vollmöller, Karl (1913). Turandot, Princess of China. A Chinoiserie in Three Acts. Authorized English version by Jethro Bithell. London: T. Fisher Unwin. Project Gutenberg. Accessed 15 September 2009.
