= Maria Carbone =

Italian operatic soprano (1908–2002)

- Maria Carbone as Minnie in La fanciulla del West, Teatro alla Scala, Milan, 1942-1943 (photo with dedication)
- Born: 15 June 1908; Castellammare di Stabia, Italy
- Died: 28 December 2002 (aged 94); Rome, Italy
- Occupation: Opera singer (soprano)

Maria Carbone (15 June 1908 – 28 December 2002) was an Italian operatic soprano. She created the lead female roles in two of Gian Francesco Malipiero's operas: the title role in Ecuba (11 January 1941) and Cleopatra in Antonio e Cleopatra (4 May 1938).

== Life and career ==
Born in Castellammare di Stabia, Carbone studied medicine for four years. She then studied music at the Conservatorio di San Pietro a Majella in Naples, receiving a diploma in piano and studying voice with Agostino Roche. She made her debut on the opera stage in 1930 at the Teatro San Carlo in Naples as Margherita in Boito's Mefistofele. She also performed there as Micaëla in Bizet's Carmen and as Mimì in Puccini's La bohème.

In 1932, she appeared at the Teatro Regio in Turin as Liù in Puccini's Turandot. She made her debut at La Scala in 1936 as Giorgetta in Puccini's Il tabarro. She also sang there the title role Minnie of his La fanciulla del West, and roles in contemporary operas, such as Respighi's Maria egiziaca and Lucrezia, Pizzetti's Fra Gherardo, Debora e Jaele and Lo straniero, and Alfano's Cyrano de Bergerac. In her later life, she recalled, "I spent my life creating operas that never saw the light again." She was also known for singing the title roles of Salome and Elektra by Richard Strauss, Salome first in Turin, then in many other Italian opera houses and in 1937 in a broadcast of EIAR Rome. She toured in South America, Germany, Switzerland and Norway, performing Fiora in Italo Montemezzi's L'amore dei tre re. She performed the title role in Busoni's Turandot in the Italian premiere at the Maggio Musicale Fiorentino of 1940.

After her marriage in 1940 to the architect Giuliano Rossini and the outbreak of World War II, Carbone rarely sang outside Italy. When she retired from the stage in the early 1950s, she taught voice at the conservatories of Venice and Milan and later privately in Turin. Her students included the soprano Maria Chiara and the baritone Benito Di Bella. She came out of retirement briefly in 1974 to sing in a concert conducted by Antonio Pedrotti commemorating the 30th anniversary of Riccardo Zandonai's death. Carbone had sung in the premiere of Zandonai's Giuliano in 1928 in the small role of "A young girl" and went on to become a noted interpreter of the title role in his Francesca da Rimini. She was also a great admirer of Pietro Mascagni and sang the leading soprano roles in many of his operas, including Maria in Guglielmo Ratcliff and the title roles in Lodoletta, Isabeau, Iris, Pinotta, and Parisina, the latter in its first radio broadcast (EIAR, Rome, 20 August 1938).

Maria Carbone died in Rome at the age of 94. A lengthy interview in which she reflects on her career and the composers she sang for appears in Lanfranco Rasponi's 1982 book The Last Prima Donnas.

== Recordings ==
Carbone rarely recorded, and only early in her career. Her only two recordings were made in 1931, Desdemona in Verdi's Otello and Micaëla in Bizet's Carmen, both in complete recordings of the operas with Carlo Sabajno conducting the La Scala Orchestra and Chorus. When the Otello was reissued in 1957, the reviewer in The New Records wrote, "Maria Carbone surprised this writer, he had forgotten what a fine singer she was on these discs. Her work in the Love Duet is exquisite, and in the Finale she is superb."
