= Jürgen Maehder =

German musicologist and opera director (born 1950)

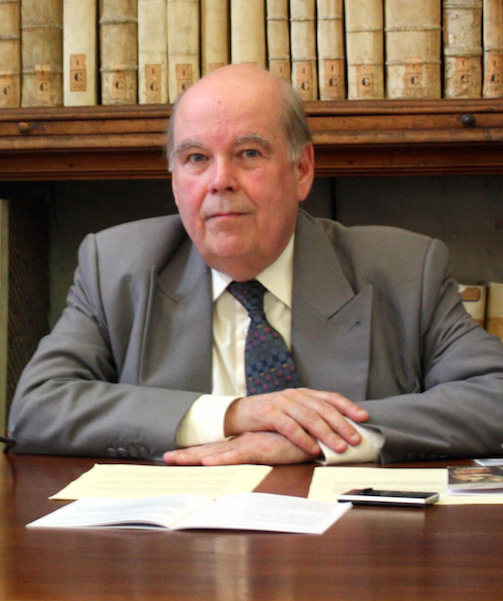
- Maehder, Pistoia, Biblioteca Forteguerriana 2014
- Born: 1950 (age 75–76); Duisburg, Germany
- Occupations: Musicologist; Opera director

Jürgen Maehder (born 1950) is a German musicologist and opera director. He discovered Franco Alfano's original version of the finale for the third act of Puccini's Turandot. He has lectured and staged opera internationally.

== Career ==
Born in Duisburg, Maehder studied in Munich and Berne, where his professors included Thrasybulos Georgiades and Stefan Kunze (musicology), Günter Bialas (composition), Arnold Metzger (philosophy), Klaus Lazarowicz (theatre history), August Everding (opera production) and Walther Killy (German literature). He took his doctorate at the University of Berne in 1977 with a dissertation entitled Klangfarbe als Bauelement des musikalischen Satzes: Zur Kritik des Instrumentationsbegriffes (Timbre as structural element of orchestral texture: towards a criticism of the term orchestration).

After appointments as assistant professor at the University of Berne and researcher at the German Historical Institute in Rome, he spent the academic year 1988/89 as associate professor of musicology at the University of North Texas in Denton/TX and as visiting professor at Cornell University in Ithaca/NY. From 1989 to 2014 he held the chair of musicology at the Freie Universität Berlin. In 1990 he founded the Puccini Research Center at Freie Universität Berlin, the first state-funded research organization for the study of Italian fin-de-siècle opera worldwide. In 1990 he contributed to the creation of the Fondo Leoncavallo at the Biblioteca Cantonale in Locarno, Switzerland, where he co-organized five international symposia between 1991 and 2006. After his retirement from Freie Universität Berlin he taught musicology and libretto history at the Department of Italian Studies of the Università della Svizzera italiana in Lugano, Switzerland.

Maehder returned to the United States as visiting professor of musicology and taught at the University of Maryland, College Park (1992), the University of North Texas in Denton/TX (1998) and the University of Hawaiʻi at Mānoa (2008). He also held numerous visiting professorships in the Republic of China/Taiwan. At present Maehder collaborates with Salzburg Festival and conducts musicological research in the Republic of China/Taiwan. In 2018 he has been elected as member of the PEN Zentrum of German authors with a foreign residence.

=== Theatre activities ===
Since 1973 Maehder has been working in European opera houses as producer, first as assistant director at Hamburg State Opera and at the Bavarian State Opera in Munich. During the 1980s he worked mostly in Italy, often in collaboration with Sylvano Bussotti. Since the 1970s Maehder has published numerous musicological articles in the program books of internationally renowned opera houses, first for the Bavarian State Opera in Munich and for Bayreuth Festival, in the 1980s for the Paris Opera, the Teatro alla Scala in Milan and the Teatro La Fenice ín Venice, the Vienna State Opera and the State Operas in Berlin. Since 1992 he has regularly collaborated with Salzburg Festival on their program books; he also worked as the festival's dramaturg in 2002. In 1996 he directed a staging of Verdi's Rigoletto at the Hawai'i Opera Theatre in Honolulu.

=== Musicological research ===
In 1978 Maehder discovered Franco Alfano's original version of the finale for act 3 of Puccini's Turandot; since 1982 his version has been widely performed by opera houses worldwide (London, Barbican Hall 1982; New York City Opera 1983; Rome, Terme di Caracalla, 1985; Bonn Opera House 1985 etc.). His international conferences on Giacomo Puccini in 1983 (Torre del Lago) and 1984 (Torre del Lago; Ravenna) marked the beginning of serious musicological as well as philological research in the field of Italian fin-de-siècle opera.

Maehder has organized international conferences on Giacomo Puccini, Ruggero Leoncavallo, Giacomo Meyerbeer, Giuseppe Verdi, Richard Wagner and Gaspare Spontini, Bohuslav Martinů and Sylvano Bussotti, on libretto history and the methodology of opera research in Italy (Torre del Lago 1983 e 1984; Ravenna 1984; Villa Vigoni, Loveno di Menaggio/CO 1993; Maiolati Spontini/AN 2007, Roma 2016), in Germany (Bad Homburg 1987; Berlin 2000; Berlin 2001; Leipzig 2004; Münster 2006), in Switzerland (Fondo Leoncavallo, Locarno/TI 1991, 1993, 1995, 1998; 2006), in Austria (Bregenz 2002; Salzburg 2002), in the Czech Republic (Praha 2000), in Russia (St. Petersburg 1994), in the Republic of China/Taiwan (Taipei, 2005; Taipei 2006; Taipei 2008; Taipei 2013). He gave papers in numerous international conferences in Germany, Austria, Switzerland, Italy, France, Spain, Portugal, Sweden, the Czech Republic, in Russia, Japan, in the Republic of China/Taiwan and the United States. Jürgen Maehder has given numerous guest lectures in Europe, Asia, the US and the Pacific region.

His research interests include the history of orchestration and timbre composition; the comparative history of 19th- and 20th-century opera in Italy, France and Germany; a comparative history of the opera libretto; 20th-century music, especially music theatre after 1950; the history of opera staging; and the aesthetics of music.

Since 1994 Maehder has published a series of musicological monographs under the title Perspektiven der Opernforschung in collaboration with Thomas Betzwieser. Together with his wife, the Taiwanese musicologist Kii-Ming Lo, he has published several musicological monographs in Chinese.

== Publications ==
- 1977 Jürgen Maehder, Klangfarbe als Bauelement des musikalischen Satzes – Zur Kritik des Instrumentationsbegriffes, Ph. D. dissertation, Bern 1977.
- 1983 Jürgen Maehder/Sylvano Bussotti, Turandot, Pisa (Giardini) 1983.
- 1985 Jürgen Maehder (ed.), Esotismo e colore locale nell'opera di Puccini. Atti del Io Convegno Internazionale sull'opera di Puccini a Torre del Lago 1983, Pisa (Giardini) 1985.
- 1993 Jürgen Maehder/Lorenza Guiot (edd.), Ruggero Leoncavallo nel suo tempo. Atti del I° Convegno Internazionale di Studi su Leoncavallo a Locarno 1991, Milano (Sonzogno) 1993.
- 1994 Jürgen Maehder/Jürg Stenzl (edd.), Zwischen Opera buffa und Melodramma. Italienische Oper im 18. und 19. Jahrhundert, »Perspektiven der Opernforschung I«, Frankfurt/Bern/New York (Peter Lang) 1994.
- 1995 Lorenza Guiot/Jürgen Maehder (edd.), Letteratura, musica e teatro al tempo di Ruggero Leoncavallo. Atti del II° Convegno Internazionale di Studi su Leoncavallo a Locarno 1993, Milano (Sonzogno) 1995.
- 1998 Lorenza Guiot/Jürgen Maehder (edd.), Nazionalismo e cosmopolitismo nell'opera tra '800 e '900. Atti del III° Convegno Internazionale di Studi su Leoncavallo a Locarno 1995, Milano (Sonzogno) 1998.
- 1998 Kii-Ming Lo/Jürgen Maehder, Puccini's »Turandot]« – Tong hua, xi ju, ge ju, Taipei (Gao Tan Publishing Co.) 1998, ISBN 957-98196-1-0.
- 2003 Kii-Ming Lo/Jürgen Maehder, Puccini's "Turandot", Guilin (Guanxi Normal University Press) 2003.
- 2003 Kii-Ming Lo/Jürgen Maehder, Ai zhi si – Hua Ge Na de »Tristan und Isolde« [Liebestod ─ »Tristan und Isolde« by Richard Wagner], Taipei (Gao Tan Publishing Co.) 2003, ISBN 957-0443-79-0.
- 2004 Kii-Ming Lo/Jürgen Maehder, Turandot de tui bian [The Transformations of »Turandot«], Taipei (Gao Tan Publishing Co.) 2004, ISBN 986-7542-50-9.
- 2005 Lorenza Guiot/Jürgen Maehder (edd.), Tendenze della musica teatrale italiana all'inizio del Novecento. Atti del IV° Convegno Internazionale di Studi su Leoncavallo a Locarno 1998, Milano (Sonzogno) 2005.
- 2006 Kii-Ming Lo/Jürgen Maehder, »Duo mei a! Jin wan de gong zhu!« – Li cha shi te lao si de »Sha le mei« [»How beautiful is the Princess tonight!« – »Salome« by Richard Strauss], Taipei (Gao Tan Publishing Co.) 2006, ISBN 986-7101-16-2.
- 2006 Kii-Ming Lo/Jürgen Maehder, Hua ge na – Zhi huan – Bai lu te, [Wagner – »Der Ring des Nibelungen« – Bayreuth], Taipei (Gao Tan Publishing Co.) 2006, ISBN 978-986-7101-33-4.
- 2010 Kii-Ming Lo/Jürgen Maehder (edd.) Shao nian mo hao ─ Ma le de shi yi chuan yuan [= »Des Knaben Wunderhorn« ─ Gustav Mahler's poetic source], Taipei (Gao Tan Publishing Co.) 2010, ISBN 978-986-6271-17-5.
- 2011 Kii-Ming Lo/Jürgen Maehder, »Da di zhi ge« ─ Ma le de ren shi xin shen [= »Das Lied von der Erde« ─ Synthesis of Gustav Mahler's Weltanschauung], Taipei (Gao Tan Publishing Co.) 2011, ISBN 978-986-6620-44-7.
- 2014 Kii-Ming Lo/Jürgen Maehder, Ai zhi si ─ Hua Ge Na de »Tristan und Isolde« [Liebestod ─ »Tristan und Isolde« by Richard Wagner], Taipei (Gao Tan Publishing Co.) 2014, ISBN 978-986-6620-50-8.
- 2015 Detlef Altenburg/Arnold Jacobshagen/Arne Langer/Jürgen Maehder/Saskia Maria Woyke (edd.), Gaspare Spontini und die Oper im Zeitalter Napoléons, Sinzig (Studio-Punkt-Verlag) 2015, ISBN 978-3-89564-150-3.
- 2017 Kii-Ming Lo/Jürgen Maehder (edd.), Hua ge na yen jiou: Shen hua, Shi wen, Yue pu, Wu tai [Richard Wagner: Myth, Poem, Score, Stage], Taipei (Gao Tan Publishing Co.) 2017, ISBN 978-986-94383-4-6.

=== Festschrift ===
- Thomas Betzwieser / Richard Erkens / Arnold Jacobshagen / Peter Ross (edd.), Libretto ─ Partitur ─ Szene. Studien zum Musiktheater. Festschrift für Jürgen Maehder zum 70. Geburtstag, Berlin / Bern / Bruxelles (Peter Lang) 2021, ISBN 978-3-63184499-1.
