= Silke Leopold =

German musicologist and university lecturer

Silke Leopold (born 30 November 1948) is a German musicologist and university lecturer.

== Life ==
Born in Hamburg, Leopold studied musicology, theatre studies, Romance languages and literature at the University of Hamburg and the University of Rome, besides also singing and transverse flute at the Hamburger Konservatorium from 1969 to 1975. From 1969 to 1980 she was member of the Monteverdi-Chor Hamburg (conducted by Jürgen Jürgens). After receiving her doctorate in 1975 on the Roman Baroque composer Stefano Landi, she spent three years as a research fellow at the German Historical Institute in Rome, then two years as a fellow of the German Research Foundation. As a research assistant to Carl Dahlhaus, she has taught at the Technische Universität Berlin since 1980, where she habilitated in 1987 with a thesis on poetry and music in the Italian solo singing of the early 17th century. After an academic year as visiting scholar at Harvard University in 1985/86 and a substitute professorship in the summer semester 1988 at the University of Regensburg she was appointed in 1991 as full professor at the Musikwissenschaftliches Seminar Detmold/Paderborn and the Hochschule für Musik Detmold.

From 1996 until her retirement in 2014, she was Professor of musicology and Director of the Musicological Institute of the Ruprecht-Karls-Universität Heidelberg. Leopold held numerous elective positions in the Academic Self-Government; from 2001 to 2007 she was vice-rector for studies and teaching at Heidelberg University, where she was responsible for the conversion of courses to the BA/MA system and a sensible distribution concept for the newly introduced tuition fees. Leopold has been a member of the Heidelberg Academy of Sciences and Humanities since 1999.

== Research ==
Leopold's research focuses on the history of music from the 16th to the 18th century and on the question of how text and music combine to form an individual organism. She has studied this in connection with the Italian language and emphasized interdisciplinary approaches. This is reflected above all in her contributions to the history of opera. Leopold has published numerous books on this subject, a complete account of the 17th century opera, and writings on the operas of Claudio Monteverdi, Georg Friedrich Handel and Wolfgang Amadeus Mozart. Further focal points are historically informed performance, the relationship between musical text and performance, aesthetics of music as well as questions of music historiography and the epochal classification of music. Since 2006 Leopold has been head of the research centre of the Südwestdeutsche Hofmusik of the Heidelberg Academy of Sciences.

== Miscellaneous ==
Parallel to her scientific career, Leopold develops extensive journalistic activities, as the communication of scientific findings to an interested public outside her peers is important to her. She moderates and writes broadcasts on topics from her specialist fields in broadcasting, has co-developed various radio formats, writes programme book texts and organises seminars and teacher training courses outside the university.

== Publications ==
- Claudio Monteverdi. Biografie, Reclam/Carus, Stuttgart 2017, ISBN 978-3-15-011093-5.
- Ich will Musik neu erzählen. René Jacobs in conversation with Leopold, Bärenreiter, Kassel etc. 2013, ISBN 978-3-89487-910-5.
- Verdi – La traviata. Henschel Verlag, Leipzig 2013, ISBN 978-3-89487-905-1.
- Händel. Die Opern. Bärenreiter, Kassel 2009, ISBN 978-3-7618-1991-3
- Die Oper im 17. Jahrhundert (= Handbuch der musikalischen Gattungen. Vol. 11). Laaber Verlag, Laaber 2004, ISBN 3-89007-134-1 (Unchanged special edition. (Geschichte der Oper. Vol. 1). ibid 2006, ISBN 3-89007-658-0).
- „Al modo d'Orfeo". Dichtung und Musik im italienischen Sologesang des frühen 17. Jahrhunderts (= Analecta Musicologica. Vol. 29). 2 volumes (vol. 1: Abhandlung. ISBN 3-89007-277-1; vol. 2: Notenbeispiele und Katalog. ISBN 3-89007-278-X). Laaber Verlag, Laaber 1995 (Zugleich: Berlin, Techn. Univ., Habil.-Schr.).
- Claudio Monteverdi und seine Zeit. Laaber Verlag, Laaber 1982, ISBN 3-921518-72-5 (2nd revised edition. ibid. 1993, ISBN 3-921518-72-5).
- Stefano Landi. Beiträge zur Biographie. Untersuchungen zur weltlichen und geistlichen Vokalmusik (Hamburger Beiträge zur Musikwissenschaft. Vol. 17). 2 volume. Verlag der Musikalienhandlung Wagner, Hamburg 1976, ISBN 3-921029-45-7 (Zugleich: Hamburg, Univ., Diss., 1975).

As editor:

- with Sabine Ehrmann-Herfort: Migration und Identität. Wanderbewegungen und Kulturkontakte in der Musikgeschichte (Analecta Musicologica 49), Bärenreiter, Kassel etc. 2013, ISBN 978-3-7618-2135-0.
- with Norbert Greiner and Sara Springfeld: Das Sonett und die Musik. Poetiken, Konjunkturen, Transformationen, Reflexionen. Beiträge zum interdisziplinären Symposium in Heidelberg vom 26. bis 28. September 2012, Winter, Heidelberg 2016, ISBN 978-3-8253-6209-6.
- Wolfgang Amadeus Mozart, Die Zauberflöte. Aria: Ein Mädchen oder Weibchen, facsimile and piano reduction, with an afterword by Silke Leopold, Bärenreiter, Kassel 2006 ISBN 978-3-7618-1775-9.
- in collaboration with Jutta Schmoll-Barthel and Sara Jeffe: Mozart-Handbuch. Bärenreiter, Kassel u. a. 2005, ISBN 3-7618-2021-6.
- Guten Morgen, liebes Weibchen! Mozarts Briefe an Constanze. Bärenreiter, Kassel etc. 2005, ISBN 3-7618-1814-9.
- with Bärbel Pelker: Hofoper in Schwetzingen. Musik, Bühnenkunst, Architektur. Winter, Heidelberg 2004, ISBN 3-8253-1524-X.
- with Thomas Betzwieser: Georg Joseph Vogler. Ein Mannheimer im europäischen Kontext (Quellen und Studien zur Geschichte der Mannheimer Hofkapelle. Vol. 7). Internationales Colloquium Heidelberg 1999. Lang, Frankfurt am Main etc. 2003, ISBN 3-631-50095-5.
- with Agnes Speck: Hysterie und Wahnsinn (Heidelberger Frauenstudien. Vol. 7). Wunderhorn, Heidelberg 2000, ISBN 3-88423-174-X.
- with Ullrich Scheideler: Oratorienführer. Metzler, Stuttgart etc. 2000, ISBN 3-476-00977-7.
- with Joachim Steinheuer: Claudio Monteverdi und die Folgen. Bericht über das Internationale Symposium Detmold 1993. Bärenreiter, Kassel etc. 1998, ISBN 3-7618-1405-4.
- with Robert Maschka: Who's who in der Oper. Bärenreiter, Kassel etc. 1997, ISBN 3-7618-1268-X (Extended New Edition. ibid 2004, ISBN 3-7618-1780-0).
- Musikalische Metamorphosen. Formen und Geschichte der Bearbeitung (Bärenreiter Studienbücher zur Musik. Vol. 2). Bärenreiter, Kassel etc. 1992, ISBN 3-7618-1051-2.

== Awards and memberships ==
- 1986 Dent Medal of the Royal Musical Association.
- 1992 Member of the Central institute (now: Academy) for Mozart research of the Internationale Stiftung Mozarteum.
- 1999 Full member of the Heidelberg Academy of Sciences and Humanities.
- 2003 Corresponding member of the American Musicological Society.
- 2013 Corresponding member of the Austrian Academy of Sciences
- 2018 Deutscher Musikeditionspreis 'BEST EDITION' for the publication of Claudio Monteverdi: Biografie.
- 2019 Handel Prize of the city of Halle.
