= Sabine Henze-Döhring =

German musicologist and opera researcher (born 1953)

Sabine Henze-Döhring (born 10 December 1953) is a German musicologist and opera researcher.

== Career ==
Henze-Döhring was born in Höxter, 10 December 1953. After her studies of German, history and musicology in Marburg, she passed the state examination for teaching at grammar schools in 1977. In 1981, she received her doctorate in musicology. From 1982 to 1985, she worked as a research assistant in the music history department of the German Historical Institute in Rome.

From 1986 to 1990, Henze-Döhring was a lecturer at the universities of Bayreuth and Bamberg. In 1991 she completed her habilitation with a thesis on Gattungstraditionen der italienischen und deutschen Oper in der ersten Hälfte des 19. Jahrhunderts.

In 1992, Henze-Döhring became professor of musicology at the Philipps-Universität Marburg. From 1994 to 1998 she was editor of the journal Die Musikforschung.

In 1996/97, she was dean, and in 2005/2006 dean of studies of the department of German and Art Studies at the University of Marburg.

Since 2017, she has been on the board of the European Music Theatre Academy (EMA) based in Vienna.

Henze-Döhring is married to the musicologist and opera researcher Sieghart Döhring.
