= René Pape =

German operatic bass singer

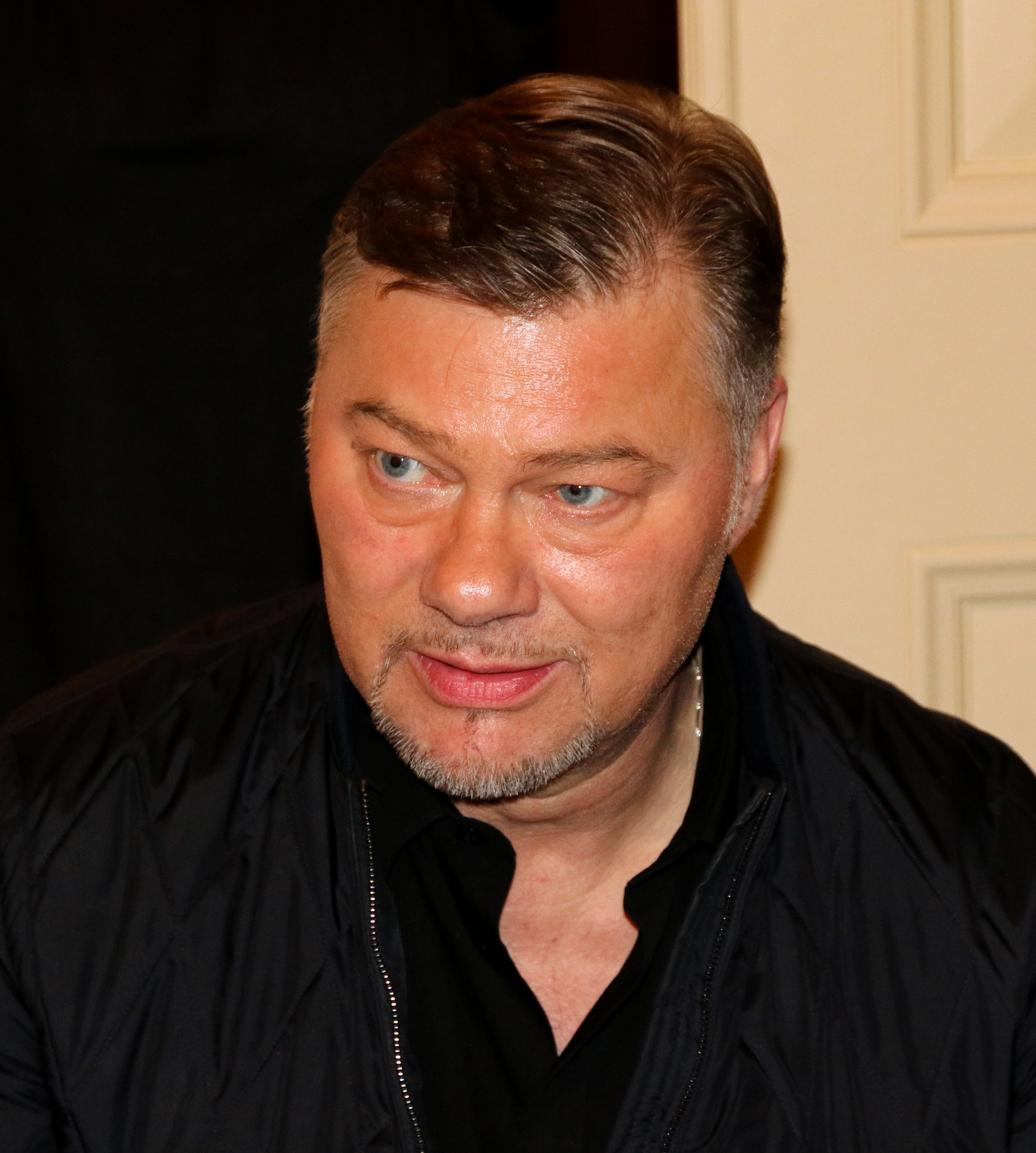
- Pape in 2016
- Born: 4 September 1964 (age 61); Dresden, Saxony, Germany
- Education: Dresdner Kreuzchor
- Occupation: Operatic bass
- Years active: 1991–currently

René Pape (born 4 September 1964) is a German operatic bass. Pape has received two Grammys, was named "Vocalist of the Year" by Musical America in 2002, "Artist of the Year" by the German opera critics in 2006, and won an ECHO award (the German equivalent of the Grammy) in 2009.

== Biography ==
René Pape was born in Dresden, then part of East Germany. His mother is a hairdresser and his father a chef. His parents divorced when he was two years old and he sometimes lived with his grandmother, who opened the way for his interest in music. His maternal grandfather was an operetta tenor.

Pape received his musical education from 1974 to 1981 with the Dresdner Kreuzchor (he even appeared as one of the Three Boys in Die Zauberflöte) and the Dresden Conservatory in the early '80s. He had his debut with the Berlin Staatsoper Unter den Linden in 1988, and joined the company of the Berlin State Opera that year. He achieved international recognition in 1991, when Sir Georg Solti cast him as Sarastro in a production of Die Zauberflöte, a role he sang again the same year at La Scala in Milan under Solti's direction. He sang in Haydn's Die Jahreszeiten with the Orchestre de Paris and the Chicago Symphony Orchestra, both under Solti (1992), then Don Fernando in Beethoven's Fidelio, the Speaker and Sarastro with the Vienna State Opera during the 1992–93 season, and King Philip in Verdi's Don Carlo in Basel.

He made his debut at the Bayreuth Festival as Fasolt in Das Rheingold in 1994, conducted by James Levine. He first performed at the Metropolitan Opera in New York City as the Night Watchman in Wagner's Die Meistersinger von Nürnberg, where he has performed practically every year since, as Fasolt, King of Egypt in Verdi's Aida in 1997, the Old Hebrew in Samson et Dalila by Saint-Saëns in 1998, King Marke in Wagner's Tristan und Isolde in 1999, Escamillo in Bizet's Carmen and Rocco in Fidelio in 2000, Orest in Elektra by Richard Strauss in 2002, Gurnemanz in Wagner's Parsifal in 2003, Leporello in Don Giovanni and King Marke in 2004, Méphistophélès in Gounod's Faust in 2005, King Heinrich, King Philip, and Sarastro in 2006, Banquo in Verdi's Macbeth in 2008, Fasolt, Hunding in Wagner's Die Walküre in 2009, and the title role of Mussorgsky's Boris Godunov in 2010.

Pape was honored on 27 October 2010 by the Metropolitan Opera Guild as part of its Met Mastersingers series. In addition to the Metropolitan Opera, Pape sings often with the Lyric Opera of Chicago, with Thielemann as Pogner, as Rocco in 2005 and Faust in 2009. He had his first solo recital in Carnegie Hall on 25 April 2009, where he sang German lieder by Schubert, Hugo Wolf and Schumann.

Pape made his debut at London's Royal Opera House as King Heinrich in Wagner's Lohengrin in 1997; and at the Paris Opéra under James Conlon as King Marke in 1998.

Pape made a highly acclaimed role debut as Wotan in Wagner's Der Ring des Nibelungen in 2011 in a new co-production by the Staatsoper Berlin, directed by Guy Cassiers, with Daniel Barenboim conducting.

Pape made his film debut as Sarastro in Kenneth Branagh's The Magic Flute, which premiered simultaneously at the 2006 Toronto International Film Festival and the 2006 Venice Film Festival. He has also performed in Hunter's Bride, a film version of Weber's Der Freischütz, released in 2010, by film director Jens Neubert, in which he sang the role of the Hermit.

Pape is also known for his performances of the song cycle Mein Herz brennt, composed by Torsten Rasch and based on the music of the heavy metal band Rammstein. In 2007, he released the Rammstein-Song "Mann gegen Mann" by the German band Rammstein in a piano version by German composer Sven Helbig.

Pape has received two Grammys for his recordings (Die Meistersinger in 1997 and Tannhäuser in 2002), was named "Vocalist of the Year" by Musical America in 2002, "Artist of the Year" by the German opera critics in 2006 for his Boris Godunov at the Berlin Staatsoper, and won in 2009 an ECHO award for his solo arias, Gods, Kings and Demons.

Pape performed in Beethoven's Ninth Symphony at the BBC Proms in 2012. He was awarded the title of an Austrian Kammersänger in 2018.

In 2017 and 2018, he appeared as King Marke in Tristan and Isolde at the Bayreuth Festival, but has no plans to return there.

In 2019, he appeared as King Philip in Don Carlo in Paris. He also appeared as Boris Godunov at the Metropolitan Opera from 2021 to 2022.

Pape's work at the Metropolitan Opera has also included the company's first production of the original 1869 version of Mussorgsky's Boris Godunov.

His repertoire includes virtually all the great German bass roles, including Pogner in Wagner's Die Meistersinger, King Heinrich in Lohengrin, Gurnemanz in Parsifal, Fasolt, Hunding and Wotan in the Ring des Nibelungen and Oreste in Strauss's Elektra. He has also appeared as Mozart's Figaro, Leporello and Don Giovanni, as Ramfis in Aida, Filippo II in Don Carlo, Méphistophélès in Faust, Escamillo in Carmen, Gremin in Eugene Onegin and the title role of Boris Godunov.

=== Controversy over homophobic comments ===
In July 2022, Pape made comments on social media regarding the participation of the Metropolitan Opera in the New York City Pride Parade which were widely regarded as homophobic. The Berlin State Opera issued a statement in condemnation of Pape's comments. Pape deleted the comments and subsequently apologised for his remarks. In his apology, he revealed his struggles with both alcoholism and depression.

== Discography ==
- Mozart: Requiem, Mar. 1992, Vienna Philharmonic conducted by Georg Solti, Decca
- Korngold: Das Wunder der Heliane, Apr. 1993, Berliner Rundfunk-Sinfonie-Orchester conducted by John Mauceri, Decca
- Mendelssohn: Die erste Walpurgisnacht, Nov. 1993, Chamber Orchestra of Europe conducted by Nikolaus Harnoncourt, Teldec
- Busoni: Turandot, Oct. 1993, Berliner Rundfunk-Sinfonie-Orchester conducted by Gerd Albrecht, Capriccio
- Wagner: Die Meistersinger von Nürnberg, Sep. 1994, Bayerischen Staatsoper conducted by Wolfgang Sawallisch, EMI Classics
- Mendelssohn: Antigone, Jan. 1995, Berliner Rundfunk-Sinfonie-Orchester conducted by Stefan Soltesz, Capriccio
- Haydn: Die Schöpfung, Feb. 1995, Chicago Symphony Orchestra conducted by Georg Solti, Decca
- Busoni: Arlecchino, Mar. 1995, Berliner Rundfunk-Sinfonie-Orchester conducted by Gerd Albrecht, Capriccio
- Beethoven: Missa solemnis, Jun. 1995, Berlin Philharmonic conducted by Georg Solti, Decca
- Beethoven: Choral Fantasy/Triple Concerto, Nov. 1995, Berlin Philharmonic conducted by Daniel Barenboim, EMI Classics
- Mendelssohn: Oedipus, Jan. 1996, Berliner Rundfunk-Sinfonie-Orchester conducted by Stefan Soltesz, Capriccio
- Wagner: Die Meistersinger von Nürnberg, Feb. 1997, Chicago Symphony Orchestra conducted by Georg Solti, Decca
- Mahler: Symphony No. 8, Mar. 1997, Bavarian Radio Symphony Orchestra conducted by Colin Davis, RCA
- Franz Schmidt: The Book with Seven Seals, Oct. 1998, Bavarian Radio Symphony Orchestra conducted by Franz Welser-Möst, EMI Classics
- Wagner: Lohengrin, Nov. 1998, Staatskapelle Berlin conducted by Daniel Barenboim, Teldec Classics
- Beethoven: Symphony No. 9, Dec. 2000, Staatskapelle Berlin conducted by Daniel Barenboim, Teldec Classics
- Beethoven: Fidelio, Jan. 2000, Staatskapelle Berlin conducted by Daniel Barenboim, Teldec Classics
- Wagner: Tannhäuser, 2001, Staatskapelle Berlin conducted by Daniel Barenboim, Teldec Classics
- Torsten Rasch: Mein Herz brennt, 2003. Dresdner Sinfoniker conducted by John Carewe, Universal Music/Deutsche Grammophon
- Rammstein: Reise, Reise, 2004, Motor/Republic
- 10th Annual Opera Gala in support of the German AIDS Foundation, May 2004, Deutsche Oper Berlin conducted by Kent Nagano, RCA
- Mozart: Bastien und Bastienne, Sep. 2005, Rundfunk-Sinfonie-Orchester Leipzig conducted by Max Pommer, Berlin Classics
- Wagner: Tristan und Isolde, Sep. 2005, Royal Opera House Covent Garden conducted by Antonio Pappano, EMI Classics
- Rammstein: Rosenrot, Oct. 2005, Universal
- Mozart: Das Mozart Album, Jul. 2006, Mahler Chamber Orchestra conducted by Claudio Abbado, Deutsche Grammophon
- Beethoven: Symphony No. 9, Oct. 2007, Cleveland Orchestra conducted by Franz Welser-Möst, Deutsche Grammophon
- Mozart: The Magic Flute, May. 2007, Mahler Chamber Orchestra conducted by Claudio Abbado, Deutsche Grammophon
- Gods, Kings & Demons, Aug. 2008, Staatskapelle Dresden conducted by Sebastian Weigle, Deutsche Grammophon
- Weber: Hunter's Bride (Der Freischütz), 2009, London Symphony Orchestra conducted by Daniel Harding, Constantin Film
- Wagner: Parsifal, September 2010, Mariinsky Theatre Orchestra and Chorus conducted by Valery Gergiev, Mariinsky
- Wagner: arias from Walküre, Die Meistersinger von Nürnberg, Lohengrin, Parsifal, Tannhäuser Staatskapelle Berlin, cond. Daniel Barenboim DGG, 2010

== Sources ==
- Louise T. Guinther, Cover Feature: René Pape, Opera News, January 2007
