= Arlecchino (opera) =

1913 one-act opera

- Opera by Ferruccio Busoni
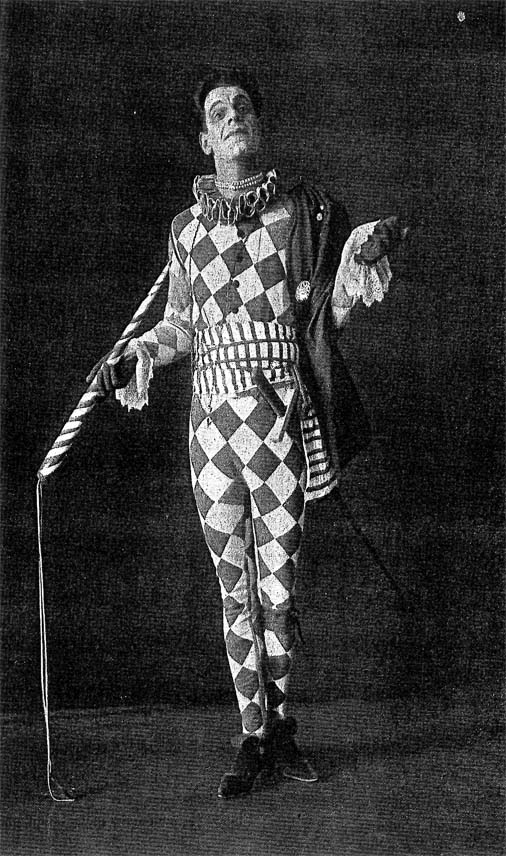
- Alexander Moissi in the title role
- Librettist: Ferruccio Busoni
- Language: German
- Premiere: 11 May 1917; Zurich Opera House

Arlecchino, oder Die Fenster (Harlequin, or The Windows, BV 270) is a one-act opera with spoken dialogue by Ferruccio Busoni, with a libretto in German, composed in 1913. He completed the music for the opera while living in Zurich in 1916. It is a number opera written in neo-classical style and includes ironic allusions to operatic conventions and situations typical of the late 18th and early 19th centuries. It even includes a parody of a duel.

== Performance history ==
The premiere performance was on 11 May 1917 at the Stadttheater, Zürich. Busoni's two-act opera Turandot was also performed on the program as part of a double-bill.

The first British staged performance of Arlecchino was in 1954 at Glyndebourne. However, Edward Clark had produced a concert version in London in 1939, using an English translation by Edward Dent. It was conducted by Hyam Greenbaum on 12 February 1939 and televised by the BBC.

== Background ==
The opera is in four movements with a corresponding representation of Arlecchino in each of them:

1. Arlecchino als Schalk (Arlecchino as Rogue) – Allegro molto
2. Arlecchino als Kriegsmann (Arlecchino as Warrior) – Allegro assai, ma marziale
3. Arlecchino als Ehemann (Arlecchino as Husband) – Tempo di minuetto sostenuto
4. Arlecchino als Sieger (Arlecchino as Conqueror) – Allegretto sostenuto

The roles in Arlecchino are derived from the Italian commedia dell'arte. It is unusual in that the title role of Arlecchino is primarily a speaking role. The composer has said that Arlecchino "has a tendency to ambiguity and hyperbole in order to place the listener momentarily in a position of slight doubt." Ronald Stevenson has described it as an "anti-opera," and an "anti-war satire."

Guido M. Gatti has commented that the opera itself illustrates Busoni's own particular ideas about opera as not depicting "realistic events," and also making use of music not continuously, but instead when it is needed and words are insufficient alone to convey the ideas of the text. Larry Sitsky describes the music as "tightly integrated" and "largely based on the 'row' [of tones] which appears as a fanfare at the commencement of the opera." And Henry Cowell has characterised this composition as "the only opera to betray knowledge of Schoenberg's early style before Wozzeck."

Because Arlecchino was too short in duration for a full evening's entertainment, Busoni composed his two-act opera Turandot to serve as an accompanying work.

== Roles ==
Role	Voice type	Premiere Cast, 11 May 1917 (Conductor: Ferruccio Busoni)
Ser Matteo del Sarto, master tailor	baritone	Wilhelm Bockholt
Abbate Cospicuo	baritone	Augustus Milner
Doctor Bombasto	bass	Henrich Kuhn
Arlecchino	spoken	Alexander Moissi
Leandro, cavalier	tenor	Eduard Grunert
Annunziata, Matteo's wife	silent	Ilse Ewaldt
Colombina, Arlecchino's wife	mezzo-soprano	Käthe Wenck
Two constables	silent	Alfons Gorski, Karl Hermann
Silent: carter, people in the windows, donkey

== Instrumentation ==
Orchestra: 2 flutes (both doubling piccolo), 2 oboes (2nd doubling English horn), 2 clarinets (2nd doubling bass clarinet in C), 2 bassoons (2nd doubling contrabassoon); 3 horns, 2 trumpets, 3 trombones; timpani, 3 percussion (glockenspiel, triangle, tambourine, military drum, bass drum, cymbals, tam-tam, celesta); strings (8 violins I, 8 violins II, 6 violas, 6 cellos, 6 double basses). Stage music: 2 trumpets, timpani.

== Synopsis ==
The opera, which is in one act, consists of a prologue and four movements. It is set in Bergamo, Italy, around about the 18th century.

=== Prologue ===
Arlecchino, in mask and motley costume, appears in front of the curtain to the sound of a fanfare and delivers a brief speech about the ensuing action.

The curtain rises to reveal a meandering and hilly street in the upper city. It is just before evening. The door to Matteo's house is front left; the entrance and sign of a wine pub are further along the street, upper right.

=== I. Arlecchino as Rogue ===
1. Introduction, Scene, and Arietta. Ser Matteo, the tailor, sits in front of his house sewing and silently reading. He becomes more animated and begins to read aloud in Italian the story of the illicit love of Paolo and Francesca from the Fifth Canto of Dante's Inferno. Ironically, through a window above, Arlecchino can be seen making love to Matteo's beautiful young wife, Annunziata. Matteo thinks of Don Juan as he contemplates the prospect of the two lovers being condemned to hell, and the orchestra softly quotes the "Champagne Aria" from Mozart's Don Giovanni. Finishing with Annunziata, Arlecchino leaps from the window, landing in front of Matteo, and recites the next line from Dante: Quel giorno più non vi leggemmo avanti ("We read no more that day"). He quickly tells the confused tailor, that war has broken out, and the barbarians are at the gate. Grabbing the tailor's scissors to hoist his coat as a banner, Arlecchino filches the house key from a pocket, and hustling Matteo inside, locks the door. Soon after he departs, from off-stage, we hear him singing an extended and defiant "la-la-le-ra!"

2. Duet. The abbot and doctor come strolling down the road in front of the house. They are deep in conversation on "professional" matters. To a series of outrageous pronouncements, the orchestra provides an accompaniment consisting of a set of variations on a pleasing Mozartian theme. Abbate Conspicuo, noticing they are in front of the lovely Annunziata's house, which is however all locked up, calls out several times to Matteo but receives no response. Finally Matteo cautiously opens the window partway to ascertain their identity.

3. Trio. Feeling reassured, Matteo reveals the sinister news of war and the imminent arrival of the barbarians. Panic ensues. The abbot recites the names of his ten daughters, fearful of their fate. Das gibt zu denken ("Something to consider"), says the doctor. Pausing for a moment's reflection, the doctor and the abbot offer to inform the mayor. Leaving on their errand, they soon stray into the neighboring inn to cogitate over a glass of Chianti.

=== II. Arlecchino as Warrior ===
4. March and Scene. In the company of two constables (Italian: sbirros) Arlecchino returns in military attire and informs Matteo he has been called up and has three minutes in which to get his house in order. While away Arlecchino has made a copy of the key, and surreptitiously returns the original. The dumbfounded tailor appears in a ridiculous improvised uniform, requests and receives permission to carry along his beloved Dante, and sadly goes off, accompanied by the two constables. [This bit evokes a sad event in Italian history. In 1499 the French captured Milan and imprisoned the leader of the city, Ludovico Sforza (who was also a close friend of Leonardo da Vinci). He was allowed one book: Dante's La divina Commedia.]

=== III. Arlecchino as Husband ===
5a. Scene and Aria. To Arlecchino's consternation, his wife Colombina appears just as he is trying to use his new key to open up Matteo's house. Not recognizing him initially, she asks the presumed Captain to protect her as an abandoned wife. As he turns round to face her, she suddenly realizes that the "Captain" is actually Arlecchino and begins reproaching him for his faithlessness, only pausing to powder her face. In response Arlecchino delivers a short speech concerning his views on marriage and fidelity: Die Treue, Madame, ist ein Laster, das meiner Ehrsamkeit nicht ansteht. – "Fealty, madame, is a vice which does not apply to my respectability."

5b. Arietta. Arlecchino concludes by asking Colombina how she sleeps. Colombina changes her tune. Singing in alternating 3/4 and 2/4, she attempts to flatter Arlecchino, describing how other women envy her position as his wife. She then sings of her own virtues as a wife: she can dance and sing, and play the tambourine. As Colombina nestles up to him, Arlecchino, not taken in by her ploy, says: O Colombina, siehst du jenen Stern? - "Oh Colombina, dost thou see yonder star?" As Colombina gazes up at the night sky, he quickly makes his escape.

6. Scene for two, then three characters. The sweet tenor voice of the cavalier Leandro is heard singing a romanza: Mit dem Schwerte, mit der Laute, zieht des Wegs der Trovador ("With sword and lute the troubadour roams"). He soon appears, with his lute and sword and wearing a feather cap. Neither slim nor young, he is a typical Italian operatic tenor. Colombina resumes her role as the abandoned woman, and Leandro launches into a classic Italian vengeance aria (Contro l'empio traditore la vendetta compierò - "Against the impious traitor shall I exact revenge"). At its conclusion he turns and bows smiling to the audience.

Colombina, however, is skeptical and poses as Elsa of Brabant (Könnt' ich jemals einem Manne noch trauen! – "Could I ever again trust a man!") and Leandro assumes the role of Lohengrin. The orchestra accompanies with a Wagnerian parody: string tremolandi, dense woodwind chords, and pointless fanfare rhythms. A bel canto parody follows (Venus sieht auf uns hernieder – "Venus looks down upon us") complete with portamento and a stretta. According to Beaumont, the stretta's "prototype lies somewhere between Cimarosa, Mozart, or Rossini but its harmonic language, with abrupt changes of key and symmetrical chromaticisms, is pure Busoni."

Arlecchino, back in his motley costume, has been watching Colombina and Leandro through his lorgnette. He now springs forward, congratulating Colombina for educating herself in his school, and escorts her to the inn. Returning to Leandro, he challenges him to a duel, fells him, and disappears into Matteo's house.

=== IV. Arlecchino as Victor ===
7. Scene, Quartet and Melodrama. Colombina, Abbate and Dottore emerge from the inn. The two men are stumbling about and bump into Leandro lying in the road. Dottore pronounces the body dead. Colombina wails and throws herself on the prostrate Leandro, but soon realizes he is alive. Dottore disputes her diagnosis, but Abbate declares a resurrection. Many faces had appeared in the windows of the neighboring houses after all the commotion, but when Abbate calls for aid, they disappear, and the windows close. A donkey cart and carter appear from around the corner, so they decide to put Leandro on the cart. As Abbate calls for prayer, Leandro revives and joins in making a quartet and a parody suggestive of Rigoletto.

Finally, as they load Leandro on the cart and the sad little group leaves the stage heading for the hospital, Arlecchino appears at the attic window of Matteo's house and bids them adieu. Climbing onto the roof he ecstatically declares:

Nun glüht mein Stern!
Die Welt ist offen!
Die Erde ist jung!
Die Liebe is frei!
Ihr Halekins!

Now shines my star!
The world is open!
The earth is young!
Love is free!
You Harlequins!

He slides down a drain pipe, opens the door, embraces the waiting Annunziata, and the two of them leave the stage.

8. Monologue. Matteo returns and enters the house. He appears at a window with a lamp in one hand and a piece of paper in the other, which he reads aloud. It is a note from Annunziata claiming she has gone off to Vespers and will soon return. Matteo emerges from the house with the lamp and his Dante, and resumes sewing at his workplace, while waiting for her return. A drop-curtain is slowly lowered, and two trumpeters in traditional theater uniforms take positions left and right.

9. Procession and Dance. (Finale.) In procession the other characters, Leandro and Colombina, Dottore and Abbate, the donkey and the cart, the two constables, and finally Arlecchino and Annunziata, cross the stage and bow to the audience. Arlecchino removes his mask and addresses the audience, explaining the new disposition of the couples, which shall last "until something new happens?" He and Annunziata join in a dance as they leave the stage. The drop-curtain rises and Matteo can be seen, still reading and waiting.

== Recordings ==
Note: Select the catalog number link for additional recording details.

Busoni: Arlecchino & Turandot - Chorus & Orchestra of the Opéra de Lyon

- Conductor: Kent Nagano
- Principal singers: Ernst Theo Richter (Arlecchino); Susanne Mentzer (Colombina); Thomas Mohr (Ser Matteo del Sarto); Wolfgang Holzmair (Abbate Cospicuo); Philippe Huttenlocher (Dottor Bombasto); Stefan Dahlberg (Leandro)
- Label: Virgin Classics VCD7 59313-2 (2 CDs)

Busoni: Arlecchino - Berlin Radio Symphony Orchestra

- Conductor: Gerd Albrecht
- Principal singers: Peter Matič (Arlecchino, spoken)/Robert Wörle (Arlecchino, sung); René Pape (Ser Matteo del Sarto); Siegfried Lorenz (Abbate Cospicuo); Peter Lika (Dottor Bombasto); Robert Wörle (Leandro); Marcia Bellamy (Colombina, sung)/Katharina Koschny (Colombina, spoken)
- Label: Capriccio 60 038-1 (1 CD)

== Downloadable score ==
- Arlecchino: Scores at the International Music Score Library Project
