= Arnold Jacobshagen =

German musicologist

Arnold Jacobshagen (born 30 December 1965) is a German musicologist. He has been teaching at the Hochschule für Musik und Tanz Köln since 2006.

== Career ==
Born in Marburg, Jacobshagen studied musicology, history and philosophy at the Free University of Berlin (with Jürgen Maehder), the University of Vienna and Paris as well as culture and media management at the Hochschule für Musik "Hanns Eisler". In 1996 he received his doctorate at the Free University. He then worked as a music dramaturg at the Staatstheater Mainz. He later held a scholarship at the German Historical Institute in Rome and at the Deutsches Studienzentrum in Venice. From 1997 to 2006 he worked as a research assistant at the Forschungsinstitut für Musiktheater of the University of Bayreuth. In 2003 he completed his habilitation there (Sieghart Döhring). Since 2006 he has held a professorship for historical musicology at the Cologne University of Music. In 2015 he was elected to the Academia Europaea.

Jacobshagen is a member of the board of the Meyerbeer Institute and the Arbeitsgemeinschaft für rheinische Musikgeschichte. He has written numerous books on the history of music, opera and contemporary musical life, or edited them in collaboration with others.

== Publications ==
- Der Chor in der französischen Oper des späten Ancien Régime (Perspektiven der Opernforschung. 5). Lang, Frankfurt/Bern/New York 1997.
- Strukturwandel der Orchesterlandschaft. Die Kulturorchester im wiedervereinigten Deutschland. Dohr, Cologne 2000.
- Opera semiseria. Gattungskonvergenz und Kulturtransfer im Musiktheater (Archiv für Musikwissenschaft. Beiheft 57). Steiner, Stuttgart 2005.
- Händel im Pantheon. Der Komponist und seine Inszenierung (Edition pp. 3). Studioverlag, Sinzig 2009.
