= Maria Chiara =

Italian lyric soprano

Maria Chiara (born 24 November 1939) is an Italian lyric soprano.

== Early life and education ==
Chiara was born on 24 November 1939 in Oderzo, Italy. She studied at the Venice Conservatory and in Turin with bass Antonio Cassinelli and soprano Maria Carbone.

== Career ==
Chiara made her debut in Venice in 1965, as Desdemona in Otello.

Chiara frequently performed roles from the operas of Giacomo Puccini and Giuseppe Verdi, including Aida, Violetta Valéry in La traviata, and the title roles in Tosca and Madama Butterfly.

At the Teatro alla Scala, Chiara appeared in Carmen (as Micaëla, conducted by Georges Prêtre, 1972) and Aida (with Luciano Pavarotti, conducted by Lorin Maazel and directed by Luca Ronconi, 1985—a performance now on DVD). With the Metropolitan Opera, she sang in four performances of La traviata (opposite John Alexander and Louis Quilico), in 1977.

Although retired as a performer, Chiara remains active in the training of new singers.
