= Torsten Rasch =

German composer (born 1965)

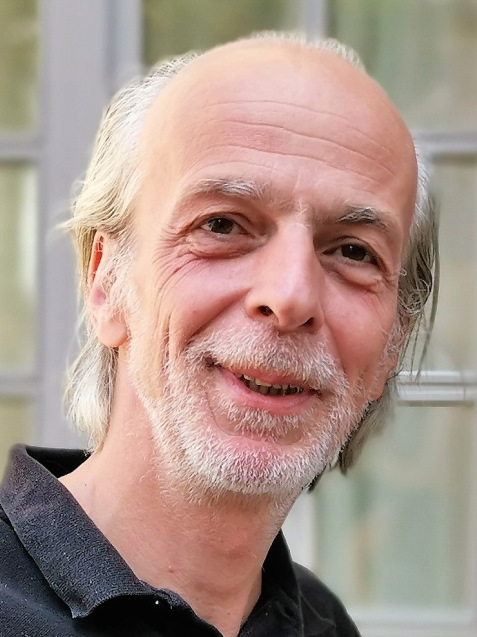
Torsten Rasch

Torsten Rasch (born 1965 in Dresden) is a German composer of contemporary classical music. He lives in Berlin, but has found success in the UK.

== Biography ==
Torsten Rasch was born in Dresden in 1965 and began piano lessons at the age of six. From 1974-82 he was a member of the renowned Dresdner Kreuzchor and subsequently went on to study composition and piano at the Carl Maria von Weber College of Music in Dresden. In 1990, after the fall of the Berlin Wall, he emigrated to Japan and established himself as a successful composer of film and TV scores, completing over 40 to date. Following an orchestral commission in 1999 from the Dresdner Sinfoniker (Völuspa-Der Seherin Gesicht for narrator and orchestra), Rasch was approached once again by the orchestra in 2002 for a commissioned song-cycle based on music and lyrics by the German industrial metal band Rammstein.

Deutsche Grammophon recorded and released the disc of the resultant 65-minute cycle Mein Herz brennt with bass René Pape, voice Katharina Thalbach and the Dresden Sinfoniker conducted by John Carewe. This followed premiere performances of the work in Dresden and Berlin in late 2003. In 2004 the disc was released in Japan and the USA, and was awarded Best World Premiere Recording at the Echo Classical Awards in Munich. In March 2006 the work was performed at the Helsinki Musica Nova to great acclaim. Later that same year, Rasch was commissioned by the ICA in London to collaborate with the Pet Shop Boys on a soundtrack for Sergei Eisenstein's silent film Battleship Potemkin and a live, screened performance took place in London's Trafalgar Square.

Meanwhile, interest in his music grew in Great Britain when he was taken up by the publisher Faber Music, London. A Piano Trio commissioned by the BBC for the 2006 Cheltenham Festival received highly appreciative reviews; an orchestral commission for the London Philharmonic Orchestra and Kurt Masur produced Wouivres. In May 2009 Vladimir Jurowski and the LPO introduced Mein Herz brennt to London, this time with the original cast of René Pape and Katharina Thalbach. In Germany his first opera, Rotter, based on a play by East German dissident Thomas Brasch, was commissioned by Cologne Opera and received its world premiere in February 2008 in a production directed by Katherina Thalbach. A new short orchestral work, Excantare fruges was premiered in Dresden by the Dresden Sinfoniker under Olari Elts in September that year. UK performances include two commissions instigated by Andreas Haefliger for the Two Moors Festival – which resulted in a setting of Oskar Kokoschka's poem "Die träumenden Knaben" using a 'Pierrot' group of players, and a String Quartet for the Kuss Quartet. These took place in September 2009. In 2012, the work was revised and a performing translation into English ("The Dreaming Boys") was produced by Dr Lee Tsang while he was lecturer at University of Hull (he is now head of Classical Music Performance at University of Liverpool) and published by Faber. The English performing translation was premiered by the Portumnus Ensemble (now Sinfonia UK Collective) at the University.

Rasch's most recent project was a commission from English National Opera and Punchdrunk – a setting of The Duchess of Malfi – which was given sold-out performances in July 2010 in a dis-used office block in London's docklands.

== Principal works ==
- Das Haus der Temperamente – suite based on the opera The Duchess of Malfi is a work commissioned by Theater Chemnitz. It was premiered in April 2013 by the Robert Schumann-Philharmonie under conductor Frank Beermann.
- was bedeutet die Bewegung... is a Mendelssohn song cycle for baritone and strings. It was commissioned by the Gewandhausorchester and first performed at Mendelssohn Hall, Leipzig, Germany by Matthias Goerne and Neues Bachisches Collegium Musicum.
- I see Phantoms, a work commissioned by the Wigmore Hall and Wolfgang Holzmair, is a dramatic scene for baritone and cello. It made its first appearance at Wigmore Hall in London.
- Ferdinand dreams... are four scenes from the opera The Duchess of Malfi for countertenor and piano, with text by John Webster. It received its premiere at Casino Baumgarten, Vienna, by Andrew Watts and Volker Krafft.
- The Duchess of Malfi – an opera lasting approximately 72 minutes. It was commissioned by English National Opera. It received its premiere at Great Eastern Quay, London UK, and was a co-production between ENO and Punchdrunk. The artistic director was Felix Barrett, with Maxine Doyle as the associate director. The conductor was Stephen Higgins.
- Die träumenden Knaben is a melodrama based on the text by Oskar Kokoschka. It is a mixed chamber ensemble commissioned by Andreas Haefliger. The first performance took place at The Two Moors Festival, St Michael's Church, Milverton UK, in 2009; performed by Andreas Haefliger, Heinz Marecek, Johannes Moser, David Orlowsky, Marina Piccinini and Tamsin Waley-Cohe.
- String Quartet No. 1 was commissioned by Andreas Haefliger at The Two Moors Festival, Ashburton in Devon, by the Kuss Quartet.
- Excantare fruges is an orchestral work lasting 10 minutes. It was commissioned by the Dresdener Sinfoniker and the Osnabrücker Symphonieorchester with the first performance taking place in 2008 at the Kulturpalast, Desden, by the Dresden Sinfoniker conducted by Olari Elts.
- Rotter, an opera in two acts, is a work lasting 160 minutes with the libretto by Thomas Brasch, adapted by Katharina Thalbach and Christoph Schwandt. It was commissioned by Opera Cologne. The work was received in 2008 at the Cologne Opera House, Germany, under the direction of Hermann Bäumer.
- Le Serpent Rouge, a song cycle for soprano and orchestra, was commissioned by the BBC in July 2010. The work received its first performance at BBC Maida Vale Studios, London by Yeree Suh, BBC Symphony Orchestra conducted by Andre de Ridder.
- Wouivres, four pieces for orchestra, is a 25 minutes piece for full orchestra. It was commissioned by the London Philharmonic Orchestra and was first performed in October 2011, Chemnitz, by the Robert Schumann Philharmonie Chemnitz conducted by Frank Beermann.
- Piano Trio was first performed at the Cheltenham International Festival by Emperor Piano Trio in 2006; this was a commission by the BBC.
- Mein Herz brennt is a work for orchestra and solo voices. It was first performed in October 2002 at Dresden Kulturpalast, Germany, by René Pape (baritone)/Katharina Thalbach (reciter)/Dresdner Sinfoniker conducted by John Carewe.
