= Reinhard Wiesend =

German musicologist

Reinhard Wiesend (born 25 May 1946 in Garmisch-Partenkirchen) is a German musicologist and retired university professor.

Wiesend studied musicology in Munich (with Thrasybulos Georgiades among others) and received his doctorate in Würzburg in 1981 (with Wolfgang Osthoff), followed by his Habilitation in 1987. Subsequently, he worked in Venice, Bayreuth and Palermo, among other places. From 2000 to 2007 he was head of the musicological institute of the University of Mainz.

Wiesend's main areas of research include Italian opera of the 18th century, including Joseph Martin Kraus, Johann Simon Mayr, Johann Adolf Hasse) as well as Hans Pfitzner.

== Publications ==
- Die Notierungen der Musikbeispiele in den Münchner Guido-Handschriften, Schriftliche Hausarbeit für die Magisterprüfung, Munich 1971
- Studien zur Opera seria von Baldassare Galuppi. Werksituation und Überlieferung – Form und Satztechnik – Inhaltsdarstellung. Mit einer Biographie und einem Quellenverzeichnis der Opern, 2 vol. (Würzburger musikhistorische Beiträge 8), Tutzing 1984
- Siciliana. Literarische und musikalische Traditionen (Habilitationsschrift Würzburg 1986; typewritten)
