= Ferruccio Busoni =

Italian composer, pianist, and conductor (1866–1924)

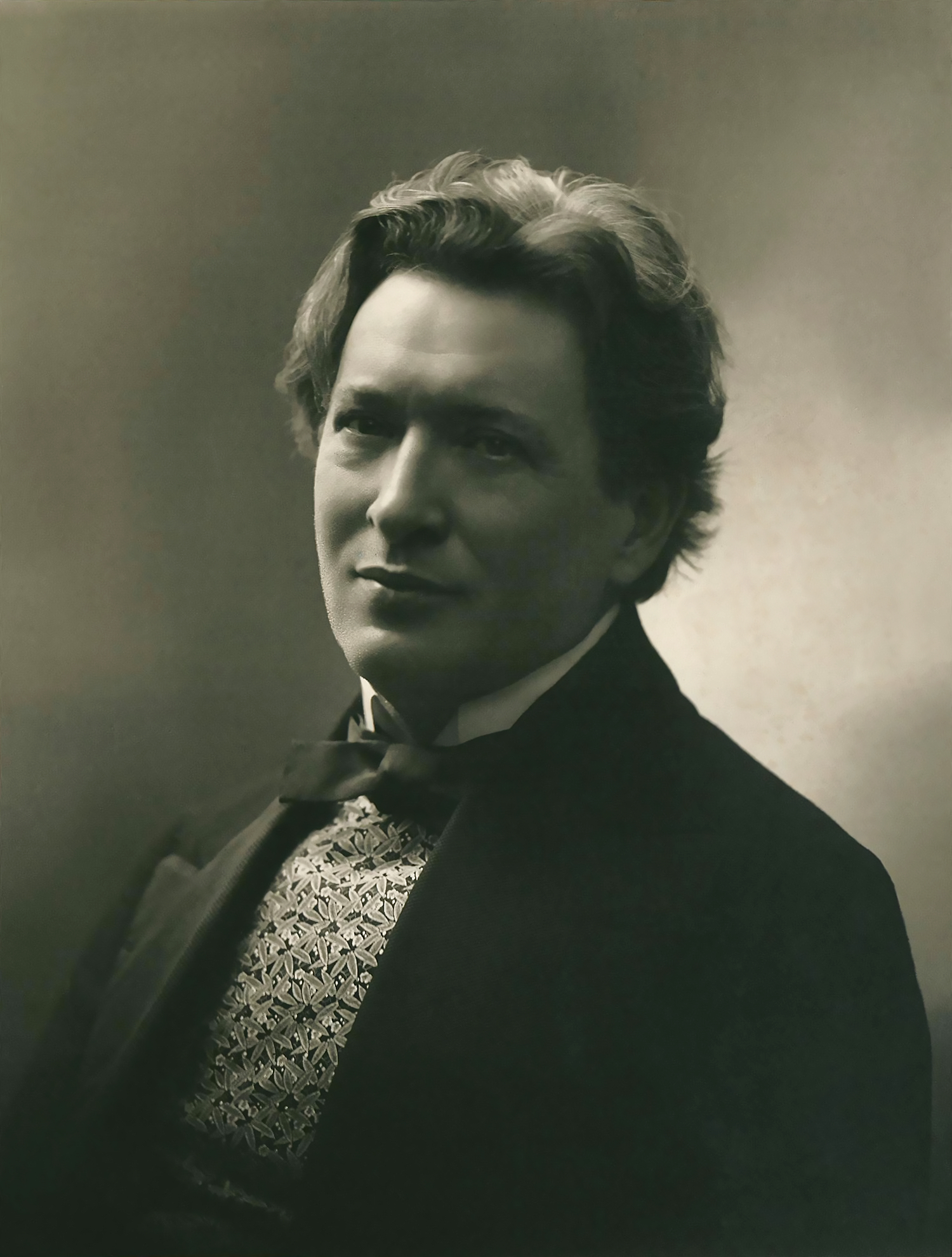
- Busoni in 1913
- Born: 1 April 1866; Empoli, Kingdom of Italy
- Died: 27 July 1924 (aged 58); Berlin, Germany
- Occupations: Composer; pianist; teacher
- Works: List of compositions; List of adaptations

Ferruccio Dante Michelangiolo Benvenuto Busoni (1 April 1866 – 27 July 1924) was an Italian composer, pianist, conductor, editor, writer, and teacher. His international career and reputation led him to work closely with many of the leading musicians, artists and literary figures of his time, and he was a sought-after keyboard instructor and a teacher of composition.

From an early age, Busoni was an outstanding, if sometimes controversial, pianist. He studied at the Vienna Conservatory and then with Wilhelm Mayer and Carl Reinecke. After brief periods teaching in Helsinki, Boston, and Moscow, he devoted himself to composing, teaching, and touring as a virtuoso pianist in Europe and the United States. His writings on music were influential, and covered not only aesthetics but considerations of microtones and other innovative topics. He was based in Berlin from 1894 but spent much of World War I in Switzerland.

He began composing in his early years in a late romantic style, but after 1907, when he published his Sketch of a New Esthetic of Music, he developed a more individual style, often with elements of atonality. His visits to America led to interest in North American indigenous tribal melodies which were reflected in some of his works. His compositions include works for piano, among them a monumental Piano Concerto, and transcriptions of the works of others, notably Johann Sebastian Bach (published as the Bach-Busoni Editions). He also wrote chamber music, vocal and orchestral works, and operas—one of which, Doktor Faust, he left unfinished when he died, in Berlin, at the age of 58.

== Biography ==
=== Early career ===
Ferruccio Dante Michelangiolo Benvenuto Busoni (Note: The names were chosen by his father to reflect Dante Alighieri, Michelangelo Buonarrotti and Benvenuto Cellini; but "in later life, Ferruccio, feeling that all these names involved too formidable a responsibility", quietly dropped them. The spelling version 'Michelangelo' is sometimes found for his third given name; the spelling 'Michelangiolo' is given by (amongst others) Dent, who consulted with Busoni's wife and family in writing his life of the composer.) was born on 1 April 1866 in the Tuscan town of Empoli, the only child of two professional musicians, Ferdinando, a clarinettist, and Anna (née Weiss), a pianist. Shortly afterwards, the family moved to Trieste. A child prodigy, largely taught by his father, he began performing and composing at the age of seven. In an autobiographical note he comments "My father knew little about the pianoforte and was erratic in rhythm, so he made up for these shortcomings with an indescribable combination of energy, severity and pedantry."

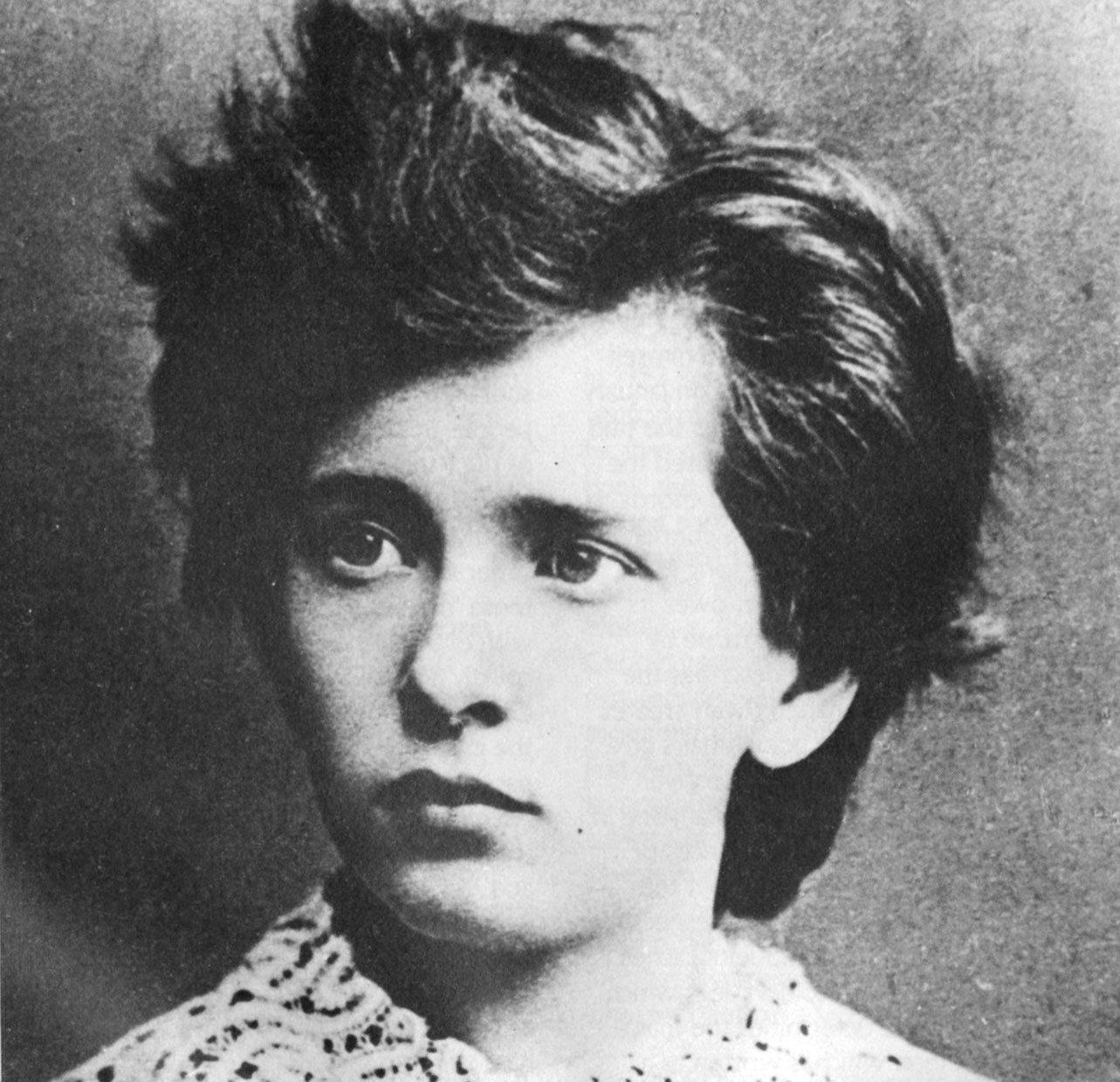
Busoni in 1877

Busoni made his public debut as a pianist in a concert with his parents at the Schiller-Verein in Trieste on 24 November 1873 playing the first movement of Mozart's Sonata in C major, and pieces by Schumann and Clementi. Commercially promoted by his parents in a series of further concerts, Busoni later said of this period, "I never had a childhood." In 1875, he made his concerto début playing Mozart's Piano Concerto No. 24.

From the ages of nine to eleven, with the help of a patron, Busoni studied at the Vienna Conservatory. His first performances in Vienna were glowingly received by the critic Eduard Hanslick. In 1877, Busoni heard the playing of Franz Liszt, and was introduced to the composer, who admired his skill. In the following year, Busoni composed a four-movement concerto for piano and string quartet. After leaving Vienna, he had a brief period of study in Graz with Wilhelm Mayer, and conducted a performance of his own composition Stabat Mater, Op. 55 in the composer's initial numbering sequence, (BV 119, now lost) in 1879. Other early pieces were published at this time, including settings of Ave Maria (Opp. 1 and 2; BV 67) and some piano pieces.

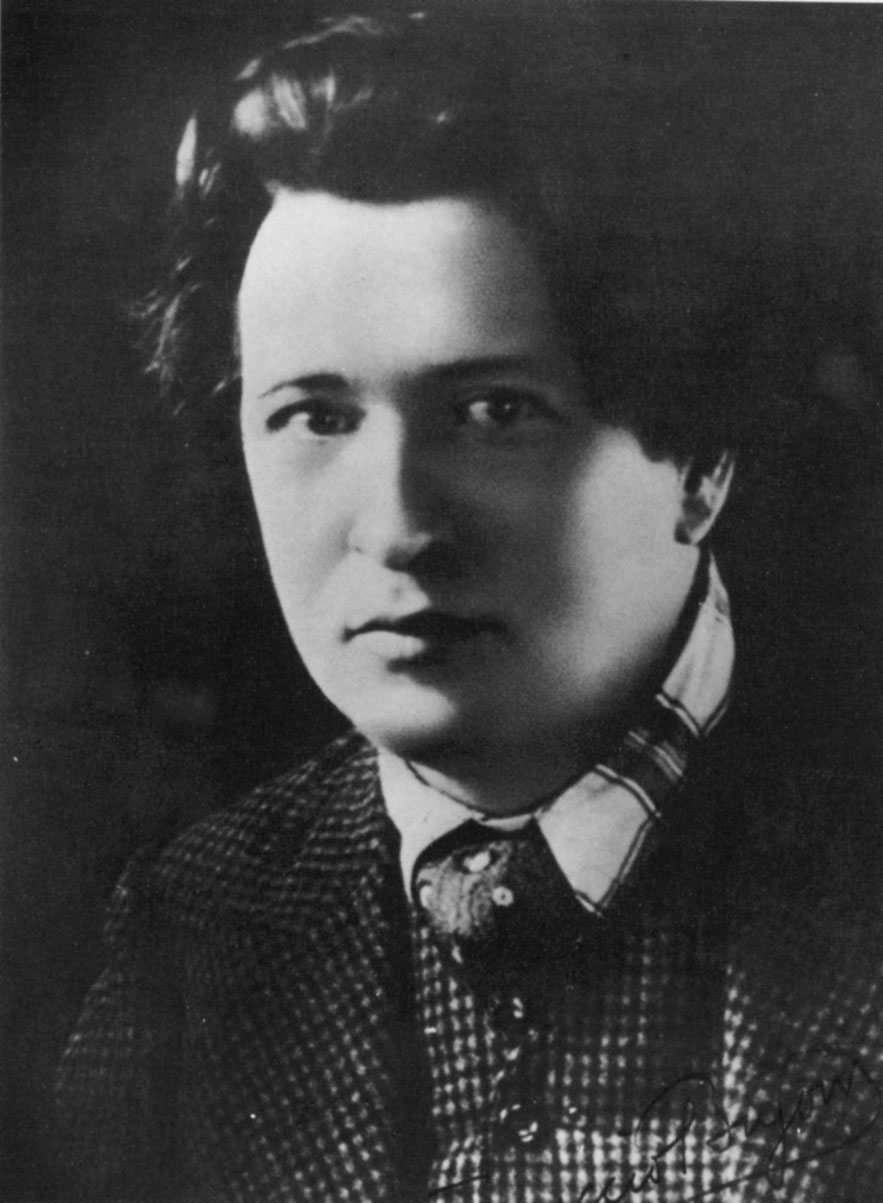
Busoni c. 1886

He was elected in 1881 to the Accademia Filharmonica of Bologna, the youngest person to receive this honour since Mozart. In the mid 1880s, Busoni was based in Vienna, where he met with Karl Goldmark and helped to prepare the vocal score for the latter's 1886 opera Merlin. He also met Johannes Brahms, to whom he dedicated two sets of piano Études, and who recommended he undertake study in Leipzig with Carl Reinecke. During this period, Busoni supported himself by giving recitals, and also by the financial support of a patron, the Baronin von Tedesco. He also continued to compose, and made his first attempt at an opera, Sigune, which he worked on from 1886 to 1889 before abandoning it. He described how, finding himself penniless in Leipzig, he appealed to the publisher Schwalm to take his compositions. Schwalm demurred, but said he would commission a fantasy on Peter Cornelius's opera The Barber of Baghdad for fifty marks down, and a hundred on completion. The next morning, Busoni turned up at Schwalm's office, and asked for 150 marks, handing over the completed work, and saying "I worked from nine at night to three thirty, without a piano, and not knowing the opera beforehand."

=== Helsingfors, Moscow, and America (1888–1893) ===
In 1888, the musicologist Hugo Riemann recommended Busoni to Martin Wegelius, director of the Institute of Music at Helsingfors (Helsinki) in Grand Duchy of Finland, then part of the Russian Empire, for the vacant position of advanced piano instructor. This was Busoni's first permanent post. Amongst his close colleagues and associates there were the conductor and composer Armas Järnefelt, the writer Adolf Paul, and the composer Jean Sibelius, with whom he struck up a continuing friendship. Paul described Busoni at this time as "a small, slender Italian with chestnut beard, grey eyes, young and gay, with ... a small round cap perched proudly on his thick artist's curls".

Between 1888 and 1890, Busoni gave about thirty piano recitals and chamber concerts in Helsingfors; amongst his compositions at this period were a set of Finnish folksongs for piano duet (Op. 27). In 1889, visiting Leipzig, he heard a performance on the organ of Bach's Toccata and Fugue in D minor (BWV 565), and was persuaded by his pupil Kathi Petri—the mother of his future pupil Egon Petri, then only five years old—to transcribe it for piano. Busoni's biographer Edward Dent writes that "This was not only the beginning of [his] transcriptions, but ... the beginning of that style of pianoforte touch and technique which was entirely [Busoni's] creation." Returning to Helsingfors, in March of the same year Busoni met his future wife, Gerda Sjöstrand, the daughter of the Swedish sculptor Carl Eneas Sjöstrand, and proposed to her within a week. He composed Kultaselle ("To the Beloved") for cello and piano for her (BV 237; published in 1891 without an opus number).

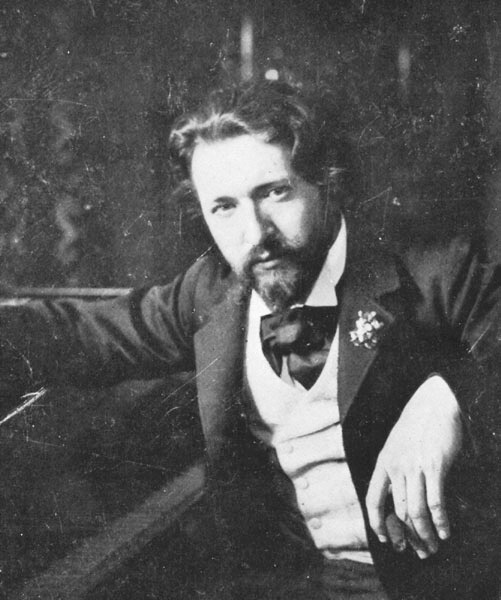
Busoni c. 1900

In 1890, Busoni published his first edition of Bach works: the two- and three-part Inventions. In the same year he won the prize for composition, with his Konzertstück ("Concert Piece") for piano and orchestra, Op. 31a (BV 236), at the first Anton Rubinstein Competition, initiated by Anton Rubinstein himself at the Saint Petersburg Conservatory. As a consequence he was invited to visit and teach at the Moscow Conservatoire. Gerda joined him in Moscow where they promptly married. His first concert in Moscow, when he performed Beethoven's Emperor Concerto, was warmly received. But living in Moscow did not suit the Busonis for both financial and professional reasons; he felt excluded by his nationalistically-inclined Russian colleagues. So when Busoni received an approach from William Steinway to teach at the New England Conservatory of Music in Boston, he was happy to take the opportunity, particularly since the conductor of the Boston Symphony Orchestra at that time was Arthur Nikisch, whom he had known since 1876 when they performed together at a concert in Vienna.

Busoni's first son, Benvenuto (known as Benni), was born in Boston in 1892, but Busoni's experience at New England Conservatory proved unsatisfactory. After a year he resigned from the Conservatory and launched himself into a series of recitals across the Eastern US.

=== Berlin, 1893–1913: "A new epoch" ===
Busoni was at the Berlin premiere of Giuseppe Verdi's opera Falstaff in April 1893. The result was to force on him a re-evaluation of the potential of Italian musical traditions which he had so far ignored in favour of the German traditions, and in particular the models of Brahms and the orchestral techniques of Liszt and Wagner. Busoni immediately began to draft an adulatory letter to Verdi (which he never summoned the courage to send), in which he addressed him as "Italy's leading composer" and "one of the noblest persons of our time", and in which he explained that "Falstaff provoked in me such a revolution of spirit that I can ... date the beginning of a new epoch in my artistic life from that time."

In 1894, Busoni settled in Berlin, which he henceforth regarded as his home base, except during the years around World War I. He had earlier felt unsympathetic toward the city: in an 1889 letter to Gerda he had described it as "this Jewish city that I hate, irritating, idle, arrogant, parvenu". (Note: Busoni's attitude to Jews and antisemitism is somewhat ambiguous. Busoni's great-great-grandfather on his mother's side was half-Jewish (although he may not have been aware of this); Busoni used Jewish melodies to characterize a Jewish character in his opera Die Brautwahl; when during World War I Busoni took a stand against German aggression, Hans Pfitzner took the occasion to call his views "a manifestation of the international Jewish movement" against Germany; in 1920 Busoni referred to his pupil Kurt Weill as "a very fine Jew, who will certainly make his way". But in protest at German hyper-inflation in 1923, he rewrote for concert performance an aria from Das Brautwahl, "The Gruesome Tale of the Jew Coiner Lippold", and naïvely expressed surprise when performance was turned down on the grounds of its anti-Semitic implications.) The city was swiftly growing in population and influence during this period and determined to stake itself as the musical capital of the united Germany, but as Busoni's friend the English composer Bernard van Dieren pointed out, "international virtuosi who for practical reasons chose Berlin as their abode were not so much concerned with questions of prestige", and for Busoni the city's development as "the centre of the musical industry [was to] develop an atmosphere which [Busoni] detested more than the deepest pool of stagnant convention".

Berlin proved an excellent base for Busoni's European tours. As in the previous two years in the US, the composer had to depend for his living on exhausting but remunerative tours as a piano virtuoso; in addition at this period he was remitting substantial amounts to his parents, who continued to depend on his income. Busoni's programming and style as a recitalist initially raised concerns in some of Europe's musical centres. His first concerts in London, in 1897, met with mixed comments. The Musical Times reported that he "commenced in a manner to irritate the genuine amateurs [i.e. music-lovers] by playing a ridiculous travesty of one of Bach's masterly Organ Preludes and Fugues, but he made amends by an interpretation of Chopin's Studies (Op. 25) which was of course unequal but, on the whole, interesting". In Paris, the critic Arthur Dandelot commented "this artist has certainly great qualities of technique and charm", but strongly objected to his addition of chromatic passages to parts of Liszt's St. François de Paule marchant sur les flots.

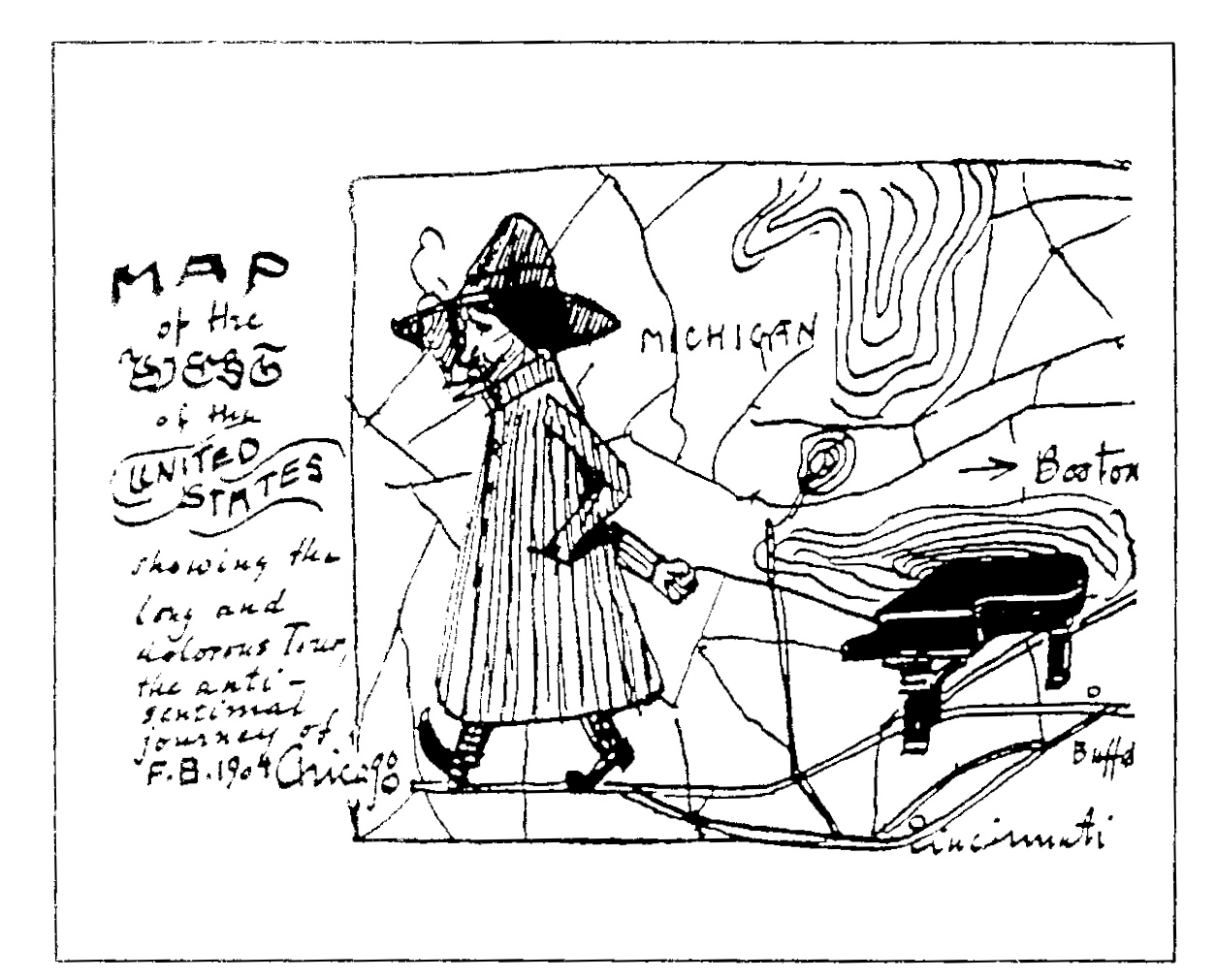
Cartoon by Busoni of his 1904 US tour, drawn for his wife: "Map of the West of the United States showing the long and dolorous Tour, the anti-sentimental journey of F.B., 1904, Chicago"

Busoni's international reputation rose swiftly, and he frequently performed in Berlin and other European capitals and regional centres (including Manchester, Birmingham, Marseilles, Florence, and many German and Austrian cities) throughout this period, as well as returning to America for four visits between 1904 and 1915. This journeying life led van Dieren to call him "a musical Ishmael" (after the Biblical wanderer). The musicologist Antony Beaumont considers Busoni's six Liszt recitals in Berlin of 1911 as the climax of his pre-war career as a pianist.

Busoni's performing commitments somewhat stifled his creative capacity during this period: in 1896 he wrote "I have great success as a pianist, the composer I conceal for the present." His monumental Piano Concerto (whose five movements last over an hour and include an offstage male chorus) was written between 1901 and 1904. In 1904 and 1905, the composer wrote his Turandot Suite as incidental music for Carlo Gozzi's play of the same name. A major project undertaken at this time was the opera Die Brautwahl, based on a tale by E. T. A. Hoffmann, first performed (to a lukewarm reception) in Berlin in 1912. Busoni also began to produce solo piano works that clearly revealed a more mature style, including the Elegies (BV 249; 1907), the suite An die Jugend (BV 252; 1909) and the first two piano sonatinas, BV 257 (1910) and BV 259 (1912).

In a series of orchestral concerts in Berlin between 1902 and 1909, both as pianist and conductor, Busoni particularly promoted contemporary music from outside Germany (though he avoided contemporary music, except for his own, in his solo recitals). The series, which was held at the Beethovensaal (Beethoven Hall), included German premieres of music by Edward Elgar, Sibelius, César Franck, Claude Debussy, Vincent d'Indy, Carl Nielsen and Béla Bartók. The concerts also included premieres of some of Busoni's own works of the period, among them, in 1904, the Piano Concerto, in which he was the soloist under conductor Karl Muck; in 1905, his Turandot Suite, and, in 1907, his Comedy Overture. Music of older masters was included, but sometimes with an unexpected twist. For example, Beethoven's Third Piano Concerto with the eccentric first movement cadenza by Charles-Valentin Alkan (which includes references to Beethoven's Fifth Symphony). The concerts aroused much publicity but generated aggressive comments from critics. Couling suggests the programming of the concerts was "generally regarded as a provocation".

During the period Busoni undertook teaching at masterclasses at Weimar, Vienna and Basel. In 1900 he was invited by Duke Karl-Alexander of Weimar to lead a masterclass for fifteen young virtuosi. This concept was more amenable to Busoni than teaching formally in a Conservatory: the twice-weekly seminars were successful and were repeated in the following year. Pupils included Maud Allan, who later became famous as a dancer and remained a friend. His experience in Vienna in 1907 was less satisfactory, although amongst his more rewarding pupils were Ignaz Friedman, Leo Sirota, Louis Gruenberg, Józef Turczyński and Louis Closson; the latter four were dedicatees of pieces in Busoni's 1909 piano album An die Jugend. But arguments with the Directorate of the Vienna Conservatoire, under whose auspices the classes were held, soured the atmosphere. In the autumn of 1910 Busoni gave masterclasses and also carried out a series of recitals in Basel.

In the years before World War I, Busoni steadily extended his contacts in the art world in general as well as amongst musicians. Arnold Schoenberg, with whom Busoni had been in correspondence since 1903, settled in Berlin in 1911 partially as a consequence of Busoni lobbying on his behalf. In 1913 Busoni arranged at his own apartment a private performance of Schoenberg's Pierrot lunaire which was attended by, amongst others, Willem Mengelberg, Edgard Varèse, and Artur Schnabel. In Paris in 1912 Busoni had meetings with Gabriele D'Annunzio, who proposed collaboration in a ballet or opera. He also met with the Futurist artists Filippo Marinetti and Umberto Boccioni.

=== World War I and Switzerland (1913–1920) ===
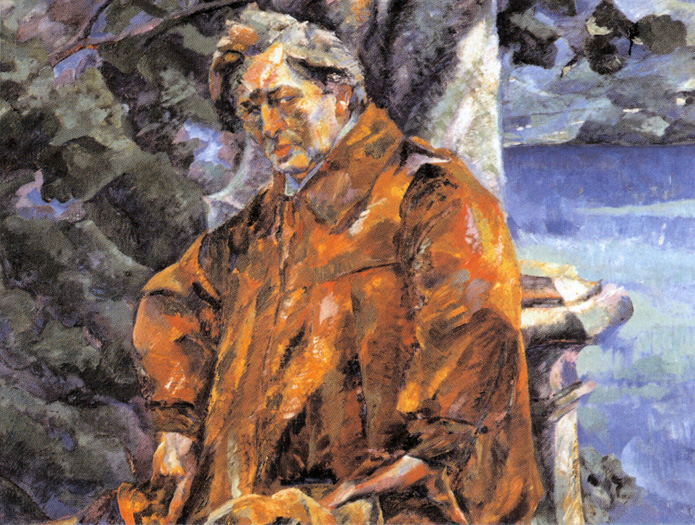
Portrait of Busoni by Umberto Boccioni, 1916 (in the collection of the Galleria Nazionale d'Arte Moderna, Rome)

Following a series of concerts in Northern Italy in spring 1913, Busoni was offered the directorship of the Liceo Rossini in Bologna. He had recently moved to an apartment in Viktoria-Luise-Platz in Schöneberg, Berlin, but took up the offer, intending to spend his summers in Berlin. The posting proved unsuccessful. Bologna was a cultural backwater, despite occasional visits from celebrities such as Isadora Duncan. Busoni's piano pupils were untalented, and he had constant arguments with the local authorities. After the outbreak of World War I, in August 1914, he asked for a year of absence to play an American tour; in fact he was never to return. Virtually his sole permanent achievement at the school was to have modernized its sanitary facilities. He had however during this time composed another concertante work for piano and orchestra, the Indian Fantasy. The piece is based on melodies and rhythms from various American Indian tribes; Busoni derived them from a book he had received from his former pupil, the ethnomusicologist Natalie Curtis Burlin during his 1910 tour of the US. The work was premiered with Busoni as soloist in March 1914, in Berlin.

From June 1914 to January 1915, Busoni was in Berlin. As a native of a neutral country (Italy) living in Germany, Busoni was not greatly concerned, at first, by the outbreak of war. During this period, he began to work seriously on the libretto for his proposed opera Doktor Faust. In January 1915 he left for a concert tour of the US, which was to be his last visit there. During this time he continued work on his Bach edition, including his version of the Goldberg Variations. Upon the composer's return to Europe, Italy had entered the war. Busoni therefore chose to base himself from 1915 in Switzerland. In Zurich, he found local supporters in Volkmar Andreae (conductor of the Tonhalle Orchestra) and Philipp Jarnach. His friend José Vianna da Motta also taught piano in Geneva at this time. Andreae arranged for Busoni to give concerts with his orchestra. Jarnach, who was 23 when he met Busoni, in 1915, became Busoni's indispensable assistant, among other things preparing piano scores of his operas; Busoni referred to him as his famulus. While in America, Busoni had carried out further work on Doktor Faust, and had written the libretto of his one-act opera Arlecchino. He completed it in Zurich and, to provide a full evening at the theatre, reworked his earlier Turandot into a one-act piece. The two were premiered together in Zurich in May 1917.

In Italy in 1916, Busoni met again with the artist Boccioni, who painted his portrait; Busoni was deeply affected when a few months later Boccioni was killed (in a riding accident) whilst on military training, and published an article strongly critical of war. An expanded re-issue of Busoni's 1907 work A New Esthetic of Music led to a virulent counter-attack from the German composer Hans Pfitzner and an extended war of words. Busoni continued to experiment with microtones: in America he had obtained some harmonium reeds tuned in third-tones, and he claimed that he "had worked out the theory of a system of thirds of tones in two rows, each separated from each other by a semitone".

Although he met with many other artistic personalities also based in Switzerland during the war (including Stefan Zweig, who noted his extensive drinking, and James Joyce), Busoni soon found his circumstances limiting. After the end of the war, he again undertook concert tours in England, Paris and Italy. In London, he met with the composer Kaikhosru Shapurji Sorabji who played his Piano Sonata No. 1 for him (he had dedicated it to Busoni). Busoni was sufficiently impressed to write a letter of recommendation for Sorabji. When Busoni's former pupil Leo Kestenberg, by then an official at the Ministry of Culture in the German Weimar Republic, invited him to return to Germany with the promise of a teaching post and productions of his operas, he was very glad to take the opportunity.

=== Final years (1920–1924) ===
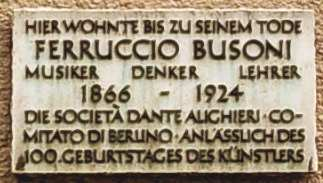
Commemorative plaque at site of Busoni's apartment in Schöneberg, Berlin

In 1920, Busoni returned to the Berlin apartment at Viktoria-Luise-Platz 11 that he had left in 1915. His health began to decline, but he continued to give concerts. His main concern was to complete Doktor Faust, the libretto of which had been published in Germany in 1918. In 1921 he wrote "Like a subterranean river, heard but not seen, the music for Faust roars and flows continually in the depths of my aspirations".

Berlin was the heart of the musical world of the Weimar Republic. Busoni's works, including his operas, were regularly programmed. Health permitting, he continued to perform; problems of hyperinflation in Germany meant that he needed to undertake tours of England. His last appearance as a pianist was in Berlin in May 1922, playing Beethoven's Emperor Concerto. Among his composition pupils in Berlin were Kurt Weill, Wladimir Vogel, and Robert Blum, and during these last years Busoni also had contact with Varèse, Stravinsky, the conductor Hermann Scherchen, and others.

Busoni died in Berlin on 27 July 1924, officially from heart failure, although inflamed kidneys and overwork also contributed to his death. Doktor Faust remained unfinished at his death and was premiered in Berlin in 1925, completed by Jarnach. Busoni's Berlin apartment was destroyed in an air-raid in 1943, and many of his possessions and papers were lost or looted. A plaque at the site commemorates his residence. Busoni's wife, Gerda, died in Sweden in 1956. Their son Benni, who, despite his American nationality had lived in Berlin throughout World War II, died there in 1976. Their second son Lello, an illustrator, died in New York in 1962.

== Music ==
=== Pianism ===
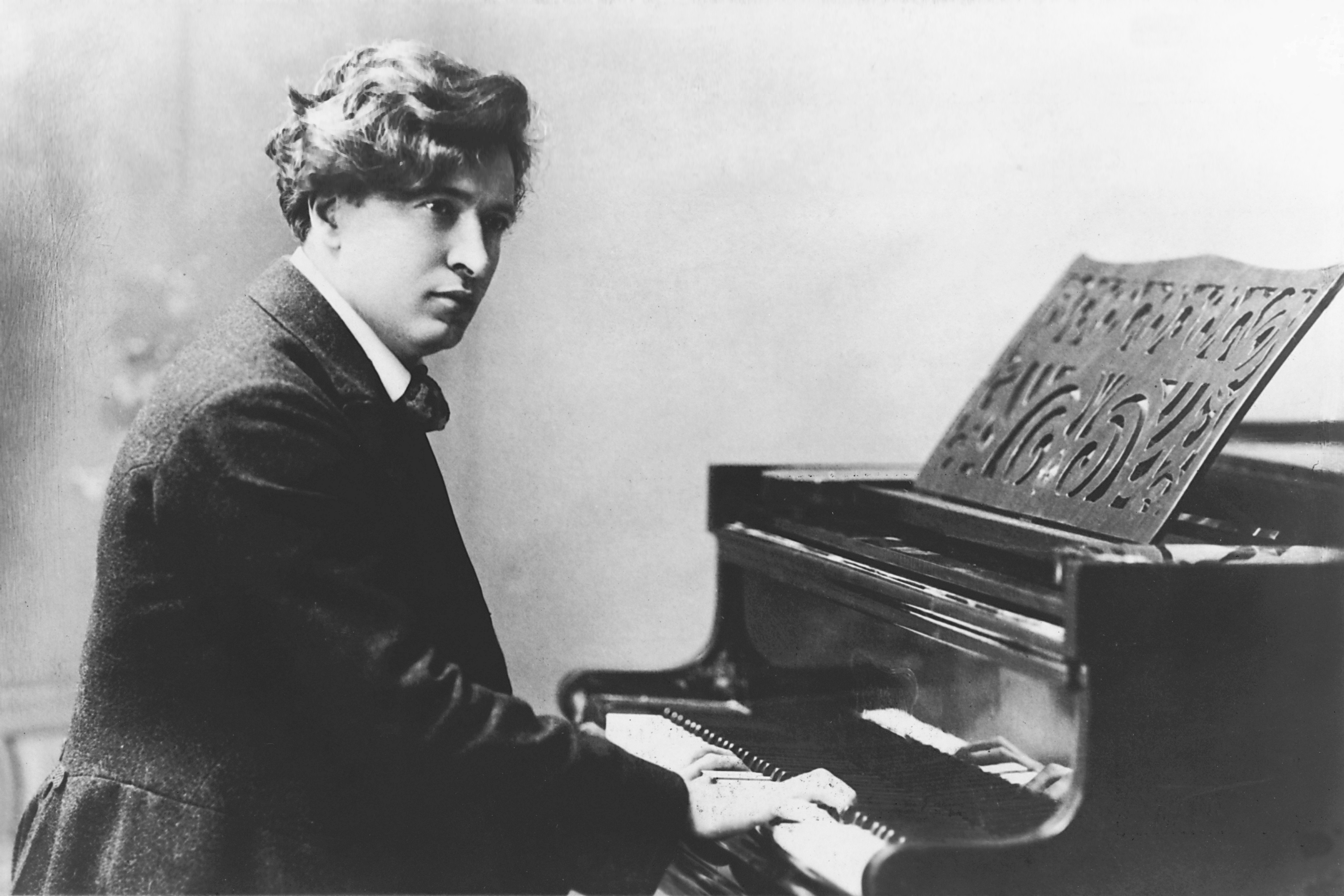
Busoni at the piano, from a postcard produced c. 1895–1900

The pianist Alfred Brendel said of Busoni's playing that it "signifies the victory of reflection over bravura" after the more flamboyant era of Liszt. He cites Busoni himself: "Music is so constituted that every context is a new context and should be treated as an 'exception'. The solution of a problem, once found, cannot be reapplied to a different context. Our art is a theatre of surprise and invention, and of the seemingly unprepared. The spirit of music arises from the depths of our humanity and is returned to the high regions whence it has descended on mankind."

Sir Henry Wood was surprised to hear Busoni playing, with two hands in double octaves, passages in a Mozart concerto written as single notes. At this, Donald Tovey proclaimed Busoni "to be an absolute purist in not confining himself strictly to Mozart's written text", that is, that Mozart himself could have taken similar liberties. The musicologist Percy Scholes wrote that "Busoni, from his perfect command over every means of expression and his complete consideration of every phrase in a composition to every other phrase and to the whole, was the truest artist of all the pianists [I] had ever heard."

=== Works ===
Busoni's works include compositions, adaptations, transcriptions, recordings and writings.

==== Opus numbers ====
Busoni gave many of his works opus numbers; some numbers apply to more than one work (after the composer dropped some of his earlier works from his acknowledged corpus). Furthermore, not all the composer's numbers are in temporal order. The musicologist Jürgen Kindermann has prepared a thematic catalogue of his works and transcriptions which is also used, in the form of the letters BV (for Busoni Verzeichnis ("Busoni Index"); sometimes the letters KiV for Kindermann Verzeichnis are used) followed by a numeric identifier, to identify his compositions and transcriptions. The identifier B (for Bearbeitung, "arrangement") is used for Busoni's transcriptions and cadenzas. For example, BV B 1 refers to Busoni's cadenzas for Beethoven's Piano Concerto No. 4.

==== Early compositions ====
In 1917, Hugo Leichtentritt suggested that the Second Violin Sonata Op. 36a (BV 244), completed in 1900, "stands on the border-line between the first and second epochs of Busoni", although van Dieren asserts that in conversation Busoni "made no such claims for any work written before 1910. This means that he dated his work as an independent composer from the piano pieces An die Jugend ... and the Berceuse in its original version for piano." (These works were actually written in 1909.) The Kindermann Busoni Verzeichnis lists over 200 compositions in the period to 1900, which are met with very rarely in the contemporary repertoire or in recording, mostly featuring piano, either as solo instrument or accompanying others, but also including some works for chamber ensemble and some for orchestra, amongst them two large-scale suites and a violin concerto.

Antony Beaumont notes that Busoni wrote virtually no chamber music after 1898 and no songs between 1886 and 1918, commenting that this was "part of the process of freeing himself from his Leipzig background ... [evoking] worlds of middle-class respectability in which he was not at home, and [in which] the shadows of Schumann, Brahms and Wolf loomed too large." The first decade of the 20th century is described by Brendel as being for Busoni "a creative pause" after which he "finally gained an artistic profile of his own" as opposed to the "easy routine which had kept his entire earlier production on the tracks of eclecticism".

During this period, Busoni wrote his Piano Concerto (Op. 39) in 1904, considered one of the largest such works he ever wrote in terms of duration and resources. Dent comments "In construction [the Concerto] is difficult to analyse ... on account of the way in which themes are transferred from movement to another. The work has to be considered as a whole, and Busoni always desired it to be played straight through without interruption." The press reaction to the premiere of the concerto was largely one of outrage: the Tägliche Rundschau complained of "Noise, more noise, eccentricity and licentiousness", while another journal opined that "the composer would have done better to stay within more modest boundaries". Some like Marc-André Hamelin have also said that this work is closer to a symphony than a traditional piano concerto and one composed in a period of dense musical and artistic development. The other major work during this "creative pause" was the Turandot Suite. Busoni employed motifs from Chinese and other oriental music in the suite, though, as Leichtentritt points out, the Suite is "in fact the product of an Occidental mind, for whom the exact imitation of the real Chinese model would always be unnatural and unattainable ... the appearance is more artistic than the real thing would be." The suite was first performed as a purely musical item in 1905; it was used in a production of the play in 1911, and was eventually transformed into a two-act opera in 1917.

==== Busoni and Bach ====
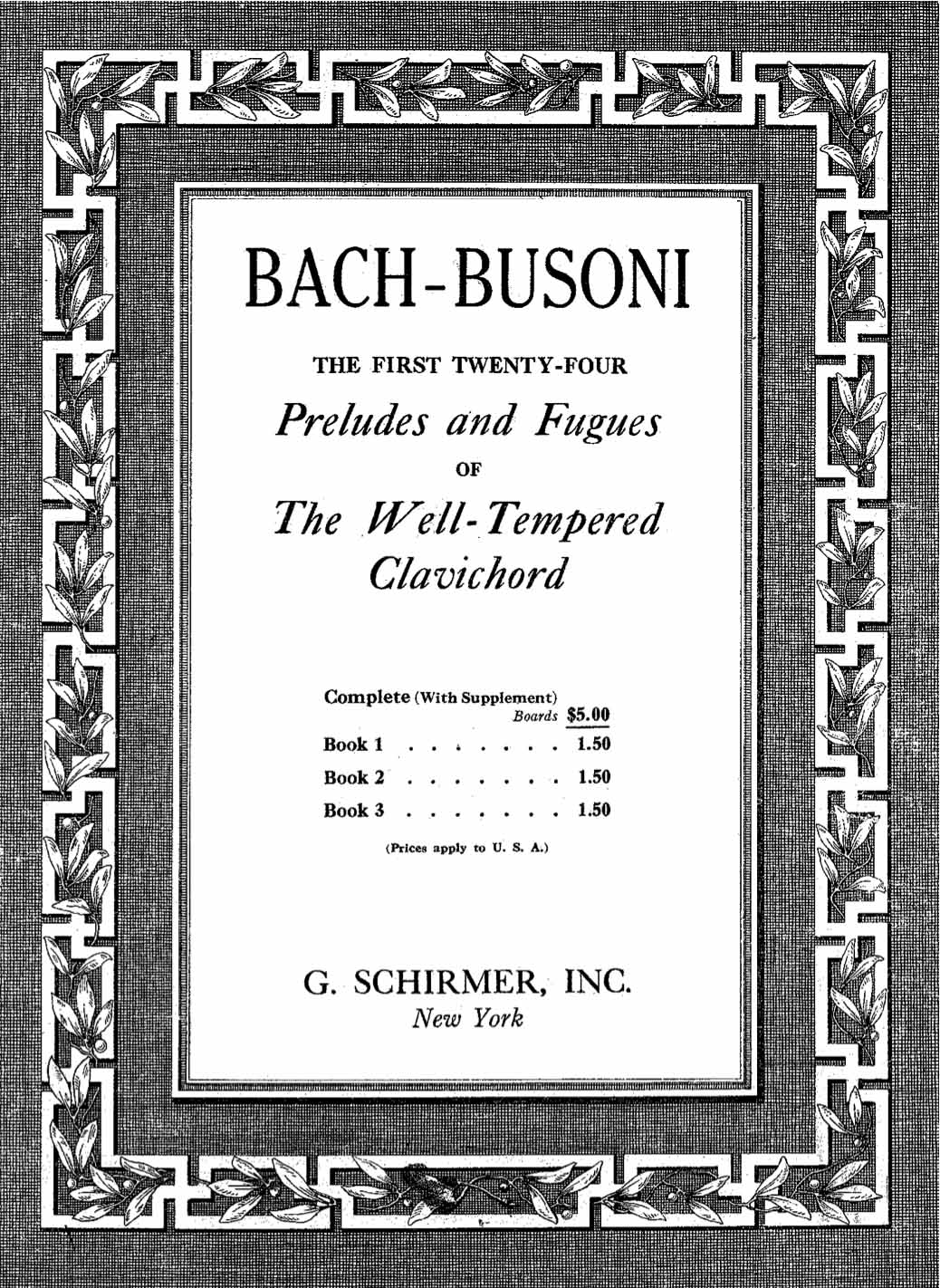
Cover of first edition of Busoni's edition of Bach's The Well-Tempered Clavier, Book I, 1894

1894 saw the publication in Berlin of the first part of Busoni's edition of the music of Johann Sebastian Bach for the piano; the first book of The Well-Tempered Clavier. This was equipped with substantial appendices, including one "On the Transcription of Bach's Organ Works for the Pianoforte". This was eventually to form a volume of the Bach-Busoni Edition, an undertaking which was to extend over thirty years. Seven volumes were edited by Busoni himself; these included the 1890 edition of the Two- and Three-Part Inventions. (Note: Busoni's work was also included in a 25-volume comprehensive "Busoni Edition" of Bach's keyboard works, the other volumes of which were undertaken by Petri and Bruno Muggelini.) Busoni also began to publish his concert piano transcriptions of Bach's music, which he often included in his own recitals. These included some of Bach's chorale preludes for organ, the organ Toccata and Fugue in D minor, and the Chromatic Fantasia and Fugue.

These transcriptions go beyond literal reproduction of the music for piano and often involve substantial recreation, although never straying from the original rhythmic outlines, melody notes and harmony. This is in line with Busoni's own concept that the performing artist should be free to intuit and communicate his divination of the composer's intentions. Busoni adds tempo markings, articulation and phrase markings, dynamics and metronome markings to the originals, as well as extensive performance suggestions. In his edition of Bach's Goldberg Variations (BV B 35), for example, he suggests cutting eight of the variations for a "concert performance", as well as substantially rewriting many sections. Kenneth Hamilton comments that "the last four variations are rewritten as a free fantasy in a pianistic style which owes far more to Busoni than to Bach."

On the death of his father in 1909, Busoni wrote in his memory a Fantasia after J. S. Bach (BV 253); and in the following year came his extended fantasy based on Bach, the Fantasia contrappuntistica.

==== Writings ====
Busoni wrote a number of essays on music. The Entwurf einer neuen Ästhetik der Tonkunst (Sketch of a New Esthetic of Music), first published in 1907, set out the principles underlying his performances and his mature compositions. A collection of reflections which are "the outcome of convictions long held and slowly matured", the Sketch asserts that "The spirit of an artwork ... remains[s] unchanged in value through changing years" but its form, manner of expression, and the conventions of the era when it was created, "are transient and age rapidly". The Sketch includes the maxim that "Music was born free; and to win freedom is its destiny". It therefore takes issue with conventional wisdom on music, caricatured by Busoni as the constricting rules of the "lawgivers". It praises the music of Beethoven and JS Bach as the essence of the spirit of music ("Ur-Musik") and says that their art should "be conceived as a beginning, and not as an unsurpassable finality." Busoni asserts the right of the interpreter vis-à-vis the purism of the "lawgivers". "The performance of music, its emotional interpretation, derives from those free heights whence descended Art itself ... What the composer's inspiration necessarily loses through notation, his interpreter should restore by his own." He envisages a future music that will include the division of the octave into more than the traditional 12 semitones. However, he asserted the importance of musical form and structure: His idea of a 'Young Classicism' (Note: Busoni's concept of 'Young Classicism' (in his original German 'Junge Klassizität') should be distinguished from the later inter-war movement of Neoclassicism, although his interest in musical form may have influenced the latter.) "aimed to incorporate experimental features in "firm, rounded forms" ... motivated each time by musical necessity." (Brendel).

Another collection of Busoni's essays was published in 1922 as Von der Einheit der Musik, later republished as Wesen und Einheit der Musik, and in 1957 translated as The Essence of Music. Busoni also wrote the librettos of his four operas.

==== Mature compositions ====
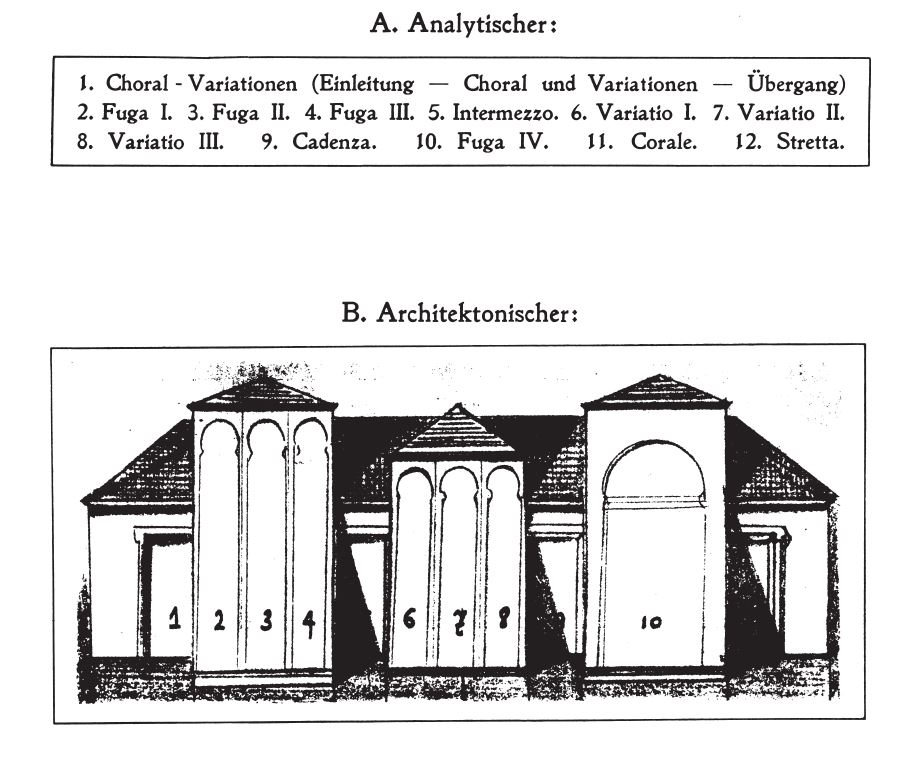
Sketch by Busoni of the structure of his Fantasia Contrappuntistica, 1910

Writing in 1917, Hugo Leichtentritt described Busoni's mature style as having elements in common with those of Sibelius, Debussy, Alexander Scriabin, and Schoenberg, noting in particular his movement away from traditional major and minor scales towards atonality.

The first landmarks of this mature style are the group of piano works published in 1907–1912 (the Elegies, the suite An die Jugend and the first two piano sonatinas) and Busoni's first completed opera, Die Brautwahl; together with the rather different Bach homage, the 1910 Fantasia contrappuntistica, Busoni's largest work for solo piano. About half an hour in length, it is essentially an extended fantasy on the final incomplete fugue from Bach's The Art of Fugue. It uses several melodic figures found in Bach's work, most notably the B-A-C-H motif. Busoni revised the work a number of times and arranged it for two pianos.

Busoni also drew inspiration from North American indigenous tribal melodies drawn from the studies of Natalie Curtis, which informed his Indian Fantasy for piano and orchestra of 1913 and two books of solo piano sketches, Indian Diary. In 1917, Busoni wrote the one-act opera Arlecchino (1917) as a companion piece for his revision of Turandot as an opera. He began serious work on his opera Doktor Faust in 1916, leaving it incomplete at his death. It was then finished by his student Philipp Jarnach, who worked with Busoni's sketches as he knew of them. In the 1980s Antony Beaumont created an expanded and improved completion by drawing on material to which Jarnach did not have access; Joseph Horowitz has described the Beaumont completion as "longer, more adventurous and perhaps less good."

In the last seven years of his life Busoni worked sporadically on his Klavierübung, a compilation of exercises, transcriptions, and original compositions of his own, with which he hoped to pass on his accumulated knowledge of keyboard technique. It was issued in five parts between 1918 and 1922 An extended version in ten books was published posthumously in 1925.

==== Editions, transcriptions and arrangements ====
Apart from his work on the music of Bach, Busoni edited and transcribed works by other composers. He edited three volumes of the 34-volume Franz Liszt Foundation's edition of Liszt's works, including most of the études, and the Grandes études de Paganini. Other Liszt transcriptions include his piano arrangement of Liszt's organ Fantasy and Fugue on the chorale "Ad nos, ad salutarem undam" (BV B 59) (based on a theme from Giacomo Meyerbeer's opera Le Prophète) and concert versions of two of the Hungarian Rhapsodies.

Busoni also made keyboard transcriptions of works by Mozart, Franz Schubert, Niels Gade and others in the period 1886–1891 for the publisher Breitkopf & Härtel. Later, during his earliest contacts with Arnold Schoenberg in 1909, he made a 'concert interpretation' of the latter's atonal Piano Piece, Op. 11, No. 2 (BV B 97) (which greatly annoyed Schoenberg himself). Busoni's own works sometimes feature incorporated elements of other composers' music. The fourth movement of An die Jugend (1909), for instance, uses two of Niccolò Paganini's Caprices for solo violin (numbers 11 and 15), while the 1920 piece Piano Sonatina No. 6 (Fantasia da camera super Carmen) is based on themes from Georges Bizet's opera Carmen.

=== Recordings ===
Busoni's output on gramophone record as a pianist was very limited, and many of his original recordings were destroyed when the Columbia Graphophone Company's factory burned down in 1912. Busoni mentions recording the Gounod-Liszt Faust Waltz in a letter to his wife in 1919. This recording was never released. He never recorded any of his own works.

==== Piano rolls ====
Busoni made a considerable number of piano rolls; a few of them have been re-recorded and released on vinyl LP and CD. These include a 1950 recording by Columbia sourced from piano rolls made by Welte-Mignon including music of Chopin and transcriptions by Liszt. The value of these recordings in ascertaining Busoni's performance style is a matter of some dispute. Many of his colleagues and students expressed disappointment with the recordings and felt they did not truly represent Busoni's pianism.

Egon Petri was horrified by the piano roll recordings when they first appeared on vinyl and said that they were a travesty of Busoni's playing. Similarly, Petri's student Gunnar Johansen who had heard Busoni play on several occasions, remarked, "Of Busoni's piano rolls and recordings, only Feux follets (no. 5 of Liszt's Transcendental Études) is really something unique. The rest is curiously unconvincing. The recordings, especially of Chopin, are a plain misalliance".

== Legacy ==
Busoni's impact on music was perhaps more through those who studied piano and composition with him, and through his writings on music, than through his compositions themselves, of whose style there are no direct successors. Alfred Brendel has opined: "Compositions like the monstrously overwritten Piano Concerto ... obstruct our view of his superlative late piano music. How topical still – and undiscovered – are the first two sonatinas... and the Toccata of 1921 ... Doktor Faust, now as ever, towers over the musical theatre of its time." Helmut Wirth has written that Busoni's "ambivalent nature, striving to reconcile tradition with innovation, his gifts as a composer and the profundity of his theoretical writings make [him] one of the most interesting figures in the history of 20th-century music."

The Ferruccio Busoni International Piano Competition was initiated in Busoni's honour in 1949, to commemorate the 25th anniversary of his death.
