= Stefan Kunze =

German musicologist

Stefan Kunze (10 February 1933 – 3 August 1992) was a German musicologist.

== Life ==
Born in Athens, Kunze, son of the classical archaeologist Emil Kunze, studied musicology from 1952 with his godfather Thrasybulos Georgiades in Ruprecht-Karls-Universität Heidelberg and Ludwig-Maximilians-Universität München, besides classical philology, flute and conducting, the latter with Kurt Eichhorn. In 1961 he received his doctorate in Munich with the thesis Die Kanzonen und Sonaten G. Gabrielis, in 1970 he was habilitated in Munich. From 1973 until his death he was Professor of Musicology at the University of Bern. The focus of his research was on 18th and 19th century music, especially the First Viennese School.

He was married to the classical archaeologist Erika Kunze-Götte. His sons are the painter Michael Kunze and the classical archaeologist Christian Kunze.

== Publications ==
- Die Instrumentalmusik Giovanni Gabrielis, mit einem Notenanhang z. T. erstmalig veröffentlichter Instrumentalkompositionen G. Gabrielis und seiner Zeitgenossen (Münchner Veröffentlichungen zur Musikgeschichte. Vol. 8). Schneider, Tutzing 1963 (überarbeitete und erweiterte Dissertation, Universität München, 1960/61).
- Don Giovanni vor Mozart. Die Tradition der Don-Giovanni-Opern im italienischen Buffa-Theater des 18. Jahrhunderts (= Münchener Universitäts-Schriften. Reihe der philosophischen Fakultät. Vol. 10). Fink, Munich 1972.
- Der Kunstbegriff Richard Wagners. Voraussetzungen und Folgerungen. (Arbeitsgemeinschaft 100 Jahre Bayreuther Festspiele Bd. 1), Gustav Bosse Verlag, Regensburg 1983, ISBN 3-7649-2058-0.
- Mozarts Opern. Reclam, Stuttgart 1984, ISBN 3-15-010326-6; italienische Ausgabe: Il teatro di Mozart. Dalla Finta semplice al Flauto magico. Marsilio, Venezia 1990, ISBN 88-317-5362-2; spanische Ausgabe: Las Operas de Mozart. Alianza Editorial, Madrid 1990, ISBN 84-206-8548-8.
- Die Antike in der Musik des 20. Jahrhunderts. Buchner, Bamberg 1987, ISBN 3-7661-5456-7.
- Die Sinfonie im 18. Jahrhundert. Von der Opernsinfonie zur Konzertsinfonie (Handbuch der musikalischen Gattungen. Bd. 1). Laaber-Verlag, Laaber 1993, ISBN 3-89007-125-2.
- De musica. Ausgewählte Aufsätze und Vorträge. In collaboration with Erika Kunze-Götte, published by Rudolf Bockholdt. Schneider, Tutzing 1998, ISBN 3-7952-0899-8.

== Bibliography ==
- Möglichkeiten und Grenzen der musikalischen Werkanalyse. Gedenkschrift Stefan Kunze (1933–1992) (Schweizer Jahrbuch für Musikwissenschaft. Neue Folge, Vol. 15). Herausgegeben von der Schweizerischen Musikforschenden Gesellschaft. Haupt, Bern/Stuttgart/Wien 1996, ISBN 3-258-05205-0, (Schriftenverzeichnis)
- Kunze, Stefan by Antonio Baldassarre 2008.
- Thomas Schacher: 75 Jahre Institut für Musikwissenschaft der Universität Bern 1921–1996. Bern 1996, p. 61–82.
