= Thomas Betzwieser =

German musicologist and opera scholar

Thomas Ludwig Betzwieser (born 23 March 1958 in Neckarhausen near Heidelberg) is a German musicologist and opera scholar. He became a member of the Akademie der Wissenschaften und der Literatur in 2015.

Betzwieser is the author of various books, including, but not limited to the following:

- Sprechen und Singen: Ästhetik und Erscheinungsformen der Dialogoper (2002)
- Exotismus und „Türkenoper“ in der französischen Musik des Ancien Régime (1993)
