= A Hero's Song =

Symphonic poem by Antonín Dvořák

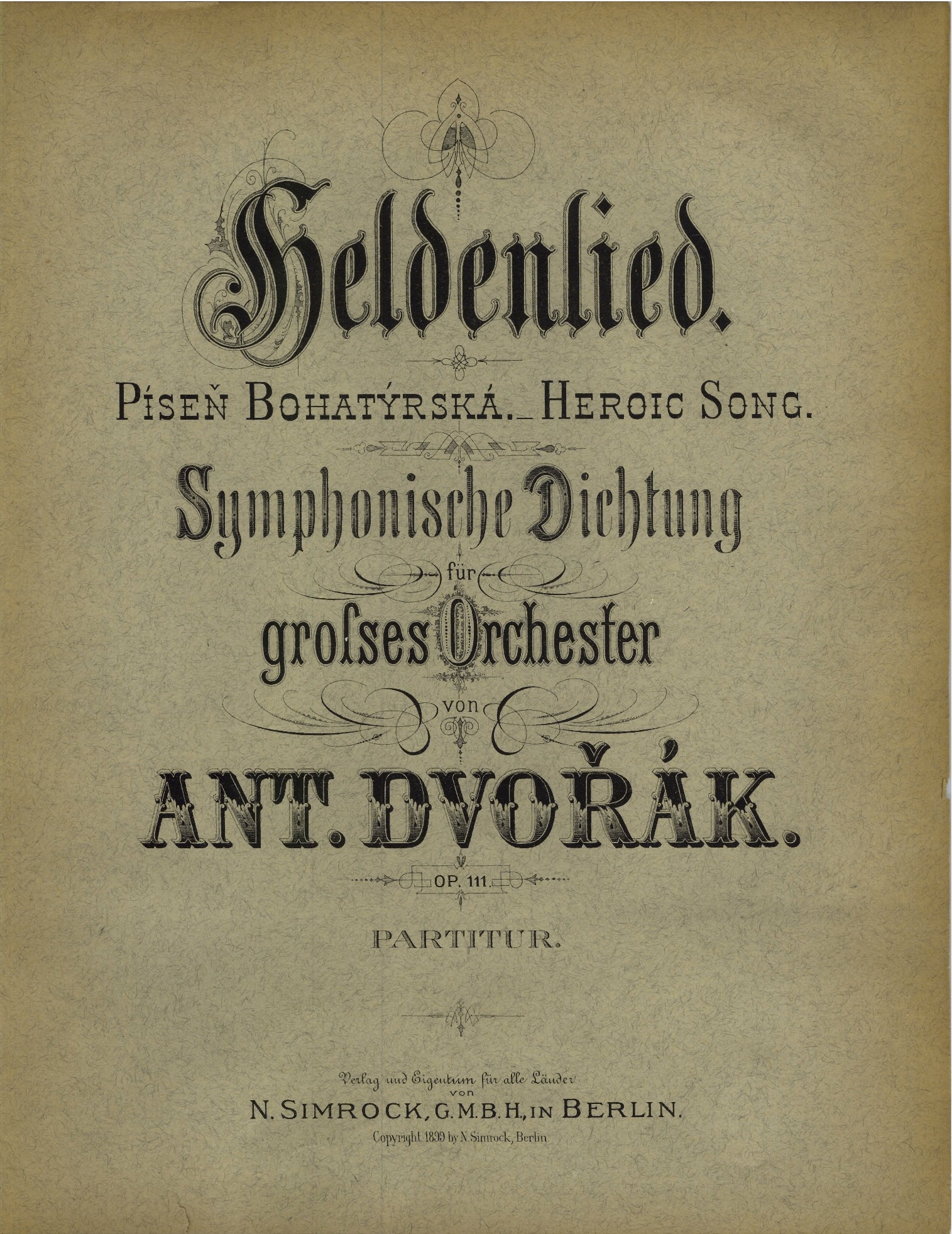
Title page of the first edition of A Hero's Song, published in 1899

A Hero's Song (Czech: Píseň bohatýrská), Op. 111, B. 199, also called Heroic Song for Orchestra, is a symphonic poem for orchestra composed by Antonín Dvořák between August 4 and October 25, 1897. It was premiered in Vienna in on December 4, 1898, with Gustav Mahler conducting the Vienna Philharmonic, and was later published in Berlin in 1899. Unlike Dvořák's other symphonic poems, this work is not based upon a specific text, and it may have been intended to be autobiographical. The piece is mostly energetic and triumphant, but it includes a slower section containing a funeral march. A typical performance lasts approximately 22 minutes.

== Instrumentation ==
The symphonic poem is scored for an orchestra of two flutes, two oboes, two clarinets, two bassoons, four horns, two trumpets, three trombones, one tuba, timpani, bass drum, cymbals, triangle and strings. The piece's instrumentation is significant because it lacks harp, unusual percussion, and nonstandard woodwinds – a simpler orchestra than most of Dvořák's other orchestral works. This is because the piece does not attempt to convey a story, but merely portrays two contrasting moods: despair (during the lacrimosa section) and triumph.

== History ==
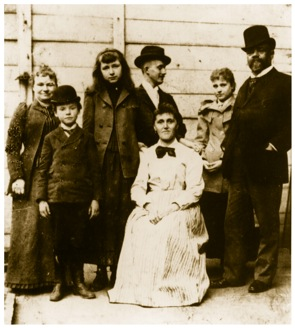
Antonín Dvořák (right) with friends and family in New York in 1893, four years before he composed A Hero's Song

A Hero's Song was Dvořák's last orchestral work and the final of his five symphonic poems, the others being The Water Goblin, The Noon Witch, The Golden Spinning Wheel, and The Wild Dove (Opp. 107–110). It is also the last instance of him writing purely instrumental music, as he dedicated himself to vocal and operatic works after its completion. He began working on the piece on August 4, 1897, immediately after revising the third act of his opera The Jacobin. The work was completed in three months, during which time Dvořák lived at his summer residence in his hometown of Příbram, and spent time at his chateau of the patron Josef Hlávka in Lužany. The piece was completed on October 25 of the same year, and was published in 1899 by Fritz Simrock in Berlin. The symphonic poem coincidentally anticipated Richard Strauss's similar tone poem Ein Heldenleben (A Hero's Life), which was composed a year later. In fact, Dvořák originally intended to title the piece A Hero's Life, a name which had been suggested to him by his pupil Vítězslav Novák.

The work was premiered by the Vienna Philharmonic on December 4, 1898, conducted by Gustav Mahler, a friend and supporter of Dvořák. Mahler wrote to Dvořák before the premiere, "I have just received your second work 'The Hero's Song' and, as with [The Wild Dove], am quite enchanted with it." Dvořák was present at the premier and had planned to conduct it himself with the Berlin Philharmonic on November 14, 1899, but cancelled his plans due to a sudden nervous breakdown – in Dvořák's words, "I was so indisposed that I had to leave Berlin with my wife without even seeing Simrock." The piece had been performed the previous day, conducted by Arthur Nikisch. It was also performed in London, Hamburg, Boston and Leipzig in October and November 1899. Dvořák was finally able to personally conduct the piece in Budapest in December of that year.

== Music ==
Dvořák often adapted Bohemian folklore for his compositions, and his previous four symphonic poems were based on actual poems by the Czech poet Karel Jaromír Erben, especially Erben's collection of ballads Kytice. A Hero's Song broke away from this pattern of programmatic symphonic works, as Dvořák did not specify a specific accompanying text, and he only roughly outlined its plot in a later letter. The lack of a fixed programme has been hypothesized as a reason for its relative neglect when compared to Dvořák's other symphonic works. It has also been suggested that the work was intended to be autobiographical, an unusual approach for Dvořák. This was Dvořák's only symphonic poem that pursued Franz Liszt's idealized view of the genre, as Dvořák's other four works were based on eerie subjects not appropriate to Liszt's conception.

A Hero's Song is musically structured like a four-movement symphony, beginning with an allegro con fuoco, transitioning to a slow poco adagio lacrimosa, then including a scherzo and concluding with a coda. The piece is based on a short, energetic theme in B♭ minor played in the violas, cellos, and basses at the start of the piece.

This theme is featured in various forms throughout the first section. Following this, a slow section is marked by quiet music which symbolizes the hero's grief. It includes a funeral march, a musical form Dvořák also used in his Requiem, Stabat Mater, and Piano Quintet No. 2. The hero recovers from his grief as the mood of the music gradually brightens and goes into B♭ major, leading into the dance-like scherzo. Finally, the triumph of the hero is represented by the victorious coda. The piece has a run time of approximately 22 minutes.

Although it is much less popular than Dvořák's other symphonic poems, A Hero's Song has been described as "an uninhibited outpouring of joyous energy" and "musically as rich as its siblings written one year earlier", while its lacrimosa section is "full of sadness and longing." Its character has been described as "a variation on Beethoven's style," Mahler's slight influence has been noted in the funeral march, and the ending has been compared to the patriotic music of Edward Elgar.

== Recordings ==
Although the work is rarely performed, it has been recorded a number of times, but has ultimately been left out of most major cycles of the composer's complete symphonic works. Prominent recordings include:

- 1982 – Zdeněk Košler conducting the Slovak Philharmonic (Opus)
- 1987 – Bohumil Gregor conducting the Czech Philharmonic (Supraphon)
- 1988 – Neeme Järvi conducting the Royal Scottish National Orchestra (Chandos)
- 1993 – Antoni Wit conducting the Polish Radio Symphony Orchestra (Naxos)
- 2004 – Theodore Kuchar conducting the Janáček Philharmonic Orchestra (Brilliant Classics)
- 2006 – Jiří Bělohlávek conducting the BBC Symphony Orchestra (Warner)
- 2012 – Andris Nelsons conducting the Bavarian Radio Symphony Orchestra (BR Klassik)
- 2025 - Jakub Hrusa conducting the Bamberger Symphoniker (Accentus)
