= Simon Rattle discography =

Simon rattle conducted many recordings over his time as a conductor with a catalog of over 250 releases, with at least 70 of those being through EMI records. His work spans from his interpretations of Beethoven, Brahms and many other famous composers and works through the many groups he has worked with over the years such as the Berliner Philharmoniker.

== Discography ==
=== With Berliner Philharmoniker ===
Album	Soloist (if any)	Label	Discs	Release year
Ades: Tevot		EMI	1	2010
Barber: Adagio for Strings	1 track from Various artists album 'Barber: Adagio'	EMI	2	2010
Bartok: Piano Concerto No. 2, Prokofiev: Piano Concerto No. 3	Lang Lang	Sony	1	2013
Beethoven: Fidelio	Angela Denoke; Jon Villars, Alan Held, Thomas Quasthoff, Rainer Trost, Arnold Schoenberg Choir	EMI	2	2003
Berlioz: Symphonie Fantastique; La mort de Cléopâtre	Susan Graham (soprano)	EMI	1	2009
Bizet: Carmen	Magdalena Kožená, Jonas Kaufmann, Genia Kühmeier, Kostas Smoriginas, Christian Van Horn	EMI	2	2012
Brahms: Complete Symphonies (Nos. 1–4)		EMI	3	2009
Brahms: Piano Concerto No. 1	Krystian Zimerman (piano)	DGG	1	2009
Brahms: Ein Deutsches Requiem	Dorothea Röschmann (soprano), Thomas Quasthoff (baritone)	EMI	1	2007
Britten: Serenade for Tenor, Horn and Strings; Les Illuminations; Nocturne	Radek Baborák (horn), Ian Bostridge (renor)	EMI	1	2005
Bruckner: Symphony No. 4		EMI	1	2007
Bruckner: Symphony No. 9 (4 Movement version)		EMI	1	2012
Debussy: La Mer; La boîte à joujoux; Prélude à l'après-midi d'un faune; Three Preludes (Orch. Matthews)		EMI	1	2005
Dvořák: Tone Poems (The Golden Spinning-Wheel; The Wood Dove; The Noonday Witch; The Water Goblin)		EMI	2	2005
Haydn: Symphonies Nos. 88-92; Sinfonia Concertante	Jonathan Kelly (oboe), Stefan Schweigert (bassoon), Toru Yasunaga (violin), Georg Faust (cello)	EMI	2	2007
Holst: The Planets; Matthews: Pluto, the Renewer; Saahiro: Asteroid 4179; Pintscher: Towards Osiris; Turnage: Ceres; Dean: Komarov's Fall		EMI	2	2006
Liszt: Faustian Symphony		EMI	1	1994
Lutoslawski: Piano Concerto; Symphony No. 2	Krystian Zimerman (piano)	DG	1	2015
Mahler: Symphony No. 2	Kate Royal, Magdalena Kožená, Rundfunkchor Berlin	EMI	2	2011
Mahler: Symphony No. 5		EMI	2	2002
Mahler: Symphony No. 6 (1986 live performance)		Im Takt Der Zeit:1987 cd #8. BPO Release	1	2007
Mahler: Symphony No. 9		EMI	2	2008
Mahler: Symphony No. 10 (Cooke)		EMI	1	2000
Messiaen: Éclairs sur l'Au-delà		EMI	1	2004
Mussorgsky: Pictures at an Exhibition; Borodin: Symphony No. 2; Polovstian Dances		EMI	1	2008
Nielsen: Flute & Clarinet Concertos	Emmanuel Pahud (flute), Sabine Meyer (clarinet)	EMI	1	2007
Orff: Carmina Burana	Sally Matthews (soprano), Lawrence Brownlee (tenor), Christian Gerhaher (baritone)	EMI	1	2005
Ravel: L'Enfant et les Sortilèges; Ma Mère l'Oye	Magdalena Kožená, Annick Massis, José Van Dam, François Le Roux and Jean-Paul Fouchécourt	EMI	1	2009
Schoenberg: Gurreleider	Quasthoff, Sofie von Otter, Mattila, Mosar, Langridge	EMI	2	2002
Schoenberg: Chamber Symphony No. 1 (1935 orchestration); Imaginary Scene For A Film; Brahms: Piano Quartet (Orch. Schoenberg)		EMI	1	2011
Schubert: Symphony No. 9		EMI	1	2006
Schumann: Complete Symphonies		Berliner Philharmoniker Recordings	2	2014
Shostakovich: Symphonies Nos. 1 & 14	Thomas Quastoff, Karita Matilla	EMI	2	2006
Shostakovich: Violin Concerto No. 1, Prokofiev: Violin Concerto No. 1	Sarah Chang (violin)	EMI	1	2006
Sibelius: Symphonies 1 to 7 (live recordings)		Berliner Philharmoniker Recordings	6	2015
Staud, Johannes Maria: Apeiron		Kairos music	1	2007
Strauss, R.: Ein Heldenleben; Le Bourgeois Gentilhomme		EMI	1	2006
Stravinsky: Symphony of Psalms; Symphony in C; Symphony in Three Movements		EMI	1	2008
Stravinsky: Le Sacre du Printemps; Symphonies of wind instruments; Apollon musagete		EMI	1	2013
Tchaikovsky: The Nutcracker: Complete Ballet	4 Different Editions: 1. Highlights version (1 CD); 2. Standard version (Full Ballet On 2 CDs); 3. Experience Edition with Hardcover Book & access to exclusive online content (2 CDs); 4. Japanese version (Full Ballet 2 CDs + 3rd disc DVD of highlights and interviews)	EMI	2	2010
Tykwer: Perfume: The Story of A Murderer (Original Soundtrack recording)		EMI	1	2006
Ravel/Dvořák/Mahler: Love & Longing Mahler Five Ruckert Leider; Ravel Scherezade; Dvořák Ten Biblical Songs (Orchestrated by Vilém Zemánek)	Magdalena Kožená (mezzo-soprano)	DG	1	2012
Welcome Sir Simon!: Promo CD comprising	Mahler Symphony No. 10 (scherzo); Bernstein Candide Overture Dvořák Slavonic Dances Op. 46 Nos. 1 & 3 Brahms Hungarian Dance No. 3 Mussorgsky Gates of Kiev; Satie Gymnopedie No. 3 Ravel Mother Goose: Le Jardin Feerique; Elgar Pomp & Circumstance March No. 4	EMI	2	2002

=== With Birmingham Symphony Orchestra and Birmingham Contemporary Music Group ===
- Adams, John
  - Harmonielehre
  - Chairman Dances
  - 2 Fanfares: Tromba Lontana & Short Ride In A Fast Machine
- Adès, Thomas
  - Asyla
- Arnold, Malcolm
  - Guitar Concerto Bream (guitar)
- Bartók, Bela
  - Violin Concerto No. 2 Chung (violin)
  - 2 Rhapsodies Chung (violin)
  - Concerto for 2 Pianos Labeque sisters (pianos)
  - Sonata for 2 Pianos Labeque sisters (pianos)
  - Concerto For Orchestra
  - The Miraculous Mandarin
  - Piano Concertos 1, 2 & 3 Donohoe (piano)
- Beethoven, Ludwig van
  - Piano Concertos 1 & 2 Vogt (piano)
- Berg, Alban
  - Lulu Suite Auger (soprano)
- Bernstein, Leonard
  - Wonderful Town Birmingham Contemporary Music Group (BCMG)
- Brahms, Johannes
  - Piano Concerto No. 1 Andsnes (piano)
  - Piano Quartet No. 1 (Orch. Schoenberg)
- Britten, Benjamin
  - American Overture
  - Ballad Of Heroes Op. 14 1–3
  - Canadian Overture
  - Cello Concerto Mork (cello) Virgin
  - Diversions for Piano & Orchestra (Left hand) 1-11
  - Occasional Overture
  - Praise We Great Men
  - Quatre Chansons Franaises
  - Scottish Ballad Op. 26
  - Sinfonia De Requiem
  - Suite On English Folk Tunes; A Time There Was...
  - The Building of The House; Overture
  - War Requiem
  - Young Apollo
  - Russian Funeral
  - Young Person's Guide to the Orchestra
- Bruckner, Anton
  - Symphony No. 7
- Carter, Elliott
  - A Celebration Of 100x150 Notes
- Doyle, Patrick
  - Henry V Original Sound Track (Kenneth Branagh film)
- Debussy, Claude
  - Jeux
  - Images
  - Le Roi Lear
- Elgar, Edward
  - Dream Of Gerontius
  - Violin Concerto Kennedy (violin)
  - Violin Concerto Ida Haendel (violin) CBSO (Rec Live 22nd Feb 1984, Royal Festival Hall, London) Testament
  - Enigma Variations
  - Grania & Diarmid
  - Falstaff
  - Cello Concerto Mork (cello) Virgin
- Ellington, Duke
  - Classic Ellington Various jazz stars Joe Lovano/Geri Allen/Clarke Terry/Lena Horne etc.
- Gershwin, George
  - Piano Concerto Donohoe (piano)
  - Song Book Donohoe (piano)
  - Rhapsody in Blue Donohoe (piano)
- Goldschmitt, Berthold
  - Passacaglia
  - Ciaccona Sinfonica Decca
- Grainger, Percy
  - In a Nutshell
  - Train Music
  - Country Gardens
  - Lincs Posy
  - The Warriors
  - Pagodes (Debussy arr. Grainger)
  - La Vallee Des Cloches (Ravel arr. Grainger)
- Grieg, Edward
  - Piano Concerto Vogt (piano)
- Haydn, Franz Joseph
  - The Creation
  - Symphonies 22/86/102
  - Symphonies 60/70/90
- Henze, Hans Werner
  - Symphony 7
  - Barcarolle
- Holt Simon
  - Boots of Lead (from CD Boots of Lead, Feet of Clay) NMC
- Janacek, Leos
  - Glagolitic Mass Palmer (soprano) EMI
- Knussen, Oliver
  - Flourish With Fireworks
- Liszt, Franz
  - Piano Concerto No. 1 Ousset (piano)
- Mahler, Gustav
  - Symphony 1/Blumine
  - Symphony 2
  - Symphony 3
  - Symphony 4
  - Symphony 6
  - Symphony 7
  - Symphony 8
  - Das Klagende Lied
  - Das Lied von der Erde Hampson/Seiffert (Tenors)
  - 8 Lieder from Das Knaben Wunderhorn
- Maw, Nicholas
  - Odyssey
- Messiaen, Olivier
  - Turangalila Symphony
- Nielsen, Carl
  - Symphony No. 4 (Inextinguishable)
  - Pan & Syrinx
- Prokofiev, Sergei
  - Symphony No. 5
  - Scythian Suite
- Rachmaninov, Sergei
  - Piano Concerto No. 2 Ousset (piano)
  - Paganini Rhapsody Ousset (piano)
  - Symphonic Dances
  - Vocalise
- Ravel, Maurice
  - The 2 Piano Concertos Ousset (piano)
  - Scherezade
  - La Valse
  - Fanfare
  - Alborada del Gracioso
  - Mother Goose
  - Valley of Bells
  - Daphnis et Chloe
  - Bolero
- Rodrigo, Joaquin
  - Concierto de Aranjuez Bream (gtr)
- Saint-Saëns, Camille
  - Piano Concerto No. 2 (Cecile Ousset Piano)
- Schoenberg, Arnold
  - Erwartung BCMG
  - Chamber Symphony 1
  - Variations for Orch BCMG
  - 5 Orchestral Pieces BCMG
  - A Survivor From Warsaw
- Schumann, Robert
  - Piano Concerto (Lars Vogt Piano)
- Shostakovich, Dimitri
  - Symphony 4
- Sibelius, Jean
  - Symphonies 1,2,3,4,5,6 & 7
  - The Oceanides
  - Scene with Cranes
  - Violin Concerto Kennedy (violin)
  - Violin Concerto Haendel, Ida (violin) CBSO (rec. 7th Sept 1993 Proms)
- Stockhausen, Karlheinz
  - Gruppen See DVD Leaving Home Complete Live DVD performance
- Stravinsky, Igor
  - Petrushka
  - Apollo
  - Symphony in 3 Movements
  - 4 Studies
  - Firebird
  - Scherzo a la Russe (Jazz Band Version)
  - Scherzo a la Russe (Orchestral Version)
  - 4 Studies
  - Rite of Spring
- Szymanowski, Karol
  - King Roger
  - Symphony 4
  - Songs of a Fairy Princess
  - Harnasie
  - Love Songs of Hafiz
  - Stabat Mater
  - Symphony 3
  - Litany to the Virgin Mary
  - Violin Concertos 1/2
- Takemitsu, Toru
  - To The Edge Of A Dream Bream (guitar)
- Turnage, Mark Antony
  - Drowned out BCMG
  - Momentum BCMG
  - kai BCMG
  - 3 Screaming Popes BCMG
- Vaughan Williams, Ralph
  - Songs of Travel Hampson/Tear (Tenors)
  - On Wenlock Edge Hampson/Tear (Tenors)
  - Lark Ascending Kennedy (violin)
- Walton, William
  - Symphony 1
  - Cello Concerto Lyn Harrell (cello)
  - Belshazzar's Feast Hampson (Tenor)
- Webern, Anton
  - 6 Orchestral Pieces BCMG
- Weill, Kurt
  - 7 Deadly Sins
- Various Composers
  - Leaving Home 1 – Rhythm/Eastern Europe/After the Wake music from the channel 4 series
  - excerpts from:
    - Stravinsky
      - Rite Of Spring (Conclusion)
    - Varese
      - Ionisation (Conclusion)
    - Boulez
      - Rituel In Memoriam Bruno Moderna (Sections 1- 7)
    - Mahler
      - Das Lied von Der Erde (6th Movement) Amanda Roorcroft (Mezzo soprano)
    - Messiaen
      - Turangalila Symphony (6th Movement)
    - Bartók
      - Lake Of Tears (Bluebeard's Castle) (Willard White, bass/Anne Sofie von Otter, Mezzo soprano)
      - Music For Strings, Percussion & Celeste (2nd Movement Opening)
    - Shostakovich
      - Symphony No. 14 (Zaporozhye Cossacks Stanzas 8 & 9)
    - Lutoslawski
      - Symphony No. 3 (Conclusion)
      - Jeux Venitiens (3rd Movement)
    - Stravinsky
      - Agon (4 Trios) (Coda)
    - Schoenberg
      - A Survivor From Warsaw (Franz Maura;Narrator) (Complete)
  - Leaving Home 2 – Tonality/Color/America/Music Now
  - excerpts from:-
    - Mahler
      - Symphony No. 7 (Opening)
    - Strauss
      - Elektra (Denn du Bist Klug) Felicity Palmer (Mezzo soprano)
    - Webern
      - 5 Pieces For Orchestra (Nos. 3–5)
    - Berg
      - Violin Concerto (Conclusion) Gidon Kremer (violin)
    - Debussy
      - Jeux (Conclusion)
    - Messiaen
      - Et Expecto Resurrectionem Mortuorum (4th Movement – Opening)
    - Takemitsu
      - Dream/Window (Conclusion)
    - Ives
      - Decoration Day (Conclusion)
    - Carter
      - A Celebration Of 100x150 Notes (Complete)
    - Bernstein
      - Symphonic Dances From West Side Story (Excerpt)
    - Henze
      - Symphony No. 8 (2nd Movement – Conclusion)
    - Gubaidulina
      - Zeitgestalten (3rd Movement)
    - Turnage
      - Drowned Out (Excerpt)
    - Knussen
      - Flourish With Fireworks (Complete)
- As of 2015 Warners have released a box set of the complete recordings by Rattle with the CBSO comprising 52 CDs.

=== With Philharmonia Orchestra ===
- Bartók, Béla
  - Violin Concerto 2, Iona Brown (violin), Philharmonic Orchestra Decca
- Holst, Gustav
  - Planets Suite EMI
- Janáček, Leos
  - The Cunning Little Vixen EMI
  - Sinfonietta EMI
  - Taras Bulba EMI
- Davies, Peter Maxwell
  - Symphony 1 Decca
- Milhaud, Darius
  - La Creation du Monde EMI
- Shostakovich, Dimitri
  - Symphony No. 10
- Sibelius, Jean
  - Night Ride & Sunrise
  - Symphony No. 5
- Stravinsky, Igor
  - Ebony Concerto EMI

=== With Vienna Philharmonic Orchestra ===
- Beethoven, Ludwig van
  - Complete Symphonies Vienna Philharmonic Orchestra (VPO)EMI
  - Piano Concertos 1 to 5 Brendel (piano) (VPO) Phillips
  - Symphony 5 (VPO) EMI (Different recording to complete symphony set)
- Brahms, Johannes
  - Violin Concerto Chung (violin) (VPO) EMI
- Mahler, Gustav
  - Symphony No. 7 (CD 9 of Mahler Feest box set, recorded live at the Royal Concertgebouw May 11, 1995)
- Schumann, Robert
  - Piano Concerto Brendel (piano) (VPO) Decca
- Strauss, Richard
  - Metamorphosen (VPO) EMI

=== With other orchestras ===
- Bernstein, Leonard
  - Prelude Fugue and Riffs (London Sinfonia) EMI
- Falla, Manuel de
  - Psyche (London Sinfonietta) Decca
  - El Retablo de Maese Pedro (London Sinfonietta) Decca
  - Concerto for Clavichord, Flute, Clarinet, Oboe, Violin, Violin Cello.. (London Sinfonietta) Decca
- Gershwin, George
  - Porgy & Bess London Philharmonic Orchestra (LPO) EMI
- Mahler, Gustav
  - Symphony 10 (Bournemouth SO) EMI
  - Das Lied von der Erde (Magdalena Kožená, Stuart Skelton, Symphonieorchester des Bayerischen Rundfunks) BR Klassik
- Mozart, Wolfgang Amadeus
  - Cosi Fan Tutti Orchestra of the Age of Enlightenment (OAE) EMI
  - Operatic Arias: (OAE) Magdalena Kožená (mezzo-soprano) Archiv/DGG
    - Le nozze di Figaro
    - At last Comes The Moment-Come Do Not Delay
    - At Last Comes The Moment-Come Hurry My Beloved
    - I No Longer Know What I Am
    - You Ladies, You Know What Love Is
    - Cosi Fan Tutti
    - You Look For Fidelity
    - He's Left Me-In Pity's Name
    - Love Is A Little Thief
    - La Clemenza Di Tito
    - No Longer Shall Hymen Descend
    - Idomeneo
    - When Will My Bitter Misfortunes Be Ended?
    - I Go, But Whither Ye Gods
    - A Great Soul & Noble Heart
    - I Forget You?-Do Not Fear O Best Beloved
- Prokofiev, Sergei
  - Piano Concerto No. 1 (Gavrilov Piano) (LSO) EMI/Phillips
- Rachmaninov, Sergei
  - Symphony 2 Los Angeles Philharmonic orchestra (LAPO) EMI
- Ravel, Maurice
  - Concerto for the Left Hand Gavrilov (piano) London Symphony Orchestra (LSO) EMI
  - 3 Poems of Stephane Mallarme from LP/CD Felicity Palmer sings Ravel F. Palmer (soprano) (Nash Ensemble) Decca
- Schoenberg, Arnold
  - Pierrot Lunaire (Nash Ensemble) Jane Manning (soprano) Chandos*
- Schumann, Robert
  - 'Das Paradies und die Peri (Sally Matthews, Mark Padmore, Kate Royal, Bernarda Fink, Andrew Staples, Florian Boesch, Simon Halsey, London Symphony Orchestra) LSO Live*
- Strauss, Richard
  - Metamorphosen (1945) (Kremerata Baltica) ECM
- Stravinsky, Igor
  - Pulcinella (Northern Sinfonia) EMI
  - Suites 1 & 2 (Northern Sinfonia) EMI
  - Rite of Spring (National Youth Orchestra) ASV
  - Symphony of Wind Instruments (Nash Ensemble) Chandos
  - 3 Japanese Lyrics (Nash Ensemble) Chandos
- Vangelis
  - Chariots of Fire (arr Goodall) (LSO with Rowan Atkinson) UMC
- Wagner, Richard
  - Das Rheingold (Michael Volle, Christian Van Horn, Benjamin Bruns, Burkhard Ulrich, Elisabeth Kulman, Annette Dasch, Janina Baechle, Symphonieorchester des Bayerischen Rundfunks) BR Klassik
- Webern, Anton
  - Concierto Op. 24 (Nash Ensemble) Chandos
- Various Composers
- The Jazz Album:a Tribute To The Jazz Age(a-g) (London Sinfonietta featuring Harvey and the Wallbangers) EMI
- a)Creamer & Layton
  - After You've Gone
- b) Kahn, Erdman, Meyers & Schoebel
  - Nobody's Sweetheart
- c)Harris & Young;;
  - Sweet Sue
- d)Bernard & Black
  - Dardanella
- e)Donaldson & Whiting
  - My Blue Heaven
- f)Donaldson & Kahn
  - Makin Whoopee
- g)McPhail & Michels
  - San

=== Other appearances ===
- Round Midnight – Rattle narrates/raps The flower is a key (Sergio Cardénas) 12 cellists of the BPO EMI
- Songs for Alexander – By yon castle wa Jocky said to Jenny ca the yowes in your garden fine an gay (Rattle) Conductor John Lubbock Orchestra of St John's Whiteline

== Box sets ==
=== The Simon Rattle Edition ===
Composer	Works	Soloists and ensembles	Discs
American Music	Adams Harmonielehrer; Chairman Dances; Tromba Lontana; Short Ride In A Fast Machine excerpts from the music of Ives, Carter, Gershwin, Bernstein; Bernstein Wonderful Town; Prelude, fugue & Riffs; Ellington The Duke Ellington Album; Gershwin Porgy & Bess;Rhapsody in Blue; Songbook; Piano Concerto in F Creamer & LaytonAfter You've Gone; Kahn, Erdman, Meyers & Schoebel Nobody's Sweetheart; Harris & Young Sweet Sue	Peter Donahoe (piano) Thomas Hampson, Michael Collins (clarinet); Willard White, Kim Criswell, Audra McDonald City of Birmingham Symphony Orchestra; London Sinfonietta, LPO, London Voices; Glyndebourne Chorus, BCMG, Harvey & The Wallbangers	7
Béla Bartók	Miraculous Mandarin; Concerto For Orchestra; Piano Concertos 1-3;Violin Concerto 2; Rhapsodies 1 & 2 Concerto For 2 Pianos, Percussion & Orchestra; Sonata For 2 Pianos & Percussion; Bluebeard's Castle: Lake Of Tears; Music For Strings, Percussion & Celeste (excerpt)	Kyung Wha Chung (violin), Peter Donohoe (piano); Katia & Marielle Labeque (pianos); Sylvio Gualdo, Jean Pierre Drouet (Percussion); City of Birmingham Symphony Orchestra	4
Ludwig van Beethoven	Symphonies 1–9; Symphony No. 5 (2000 recording); Fidelio; Piano Concertos Nos. 1 & 2 Piano Concerto No. 1 (Glenn Gould Cadenza)	Vienna Philharmonic, City of Birmingham Symphony Orchestra; Berliner Philharmoniker, Arnold Schoenberg Choir; Lars Vogt (piano) Thomas Hampson, Thomas Quastoff (Basses); Barbara Bonney (soprano)	9
British Music	Arnold Guitar Concerto Ades Asyla; Elgar Enigma Variations; Grania & Diarmid; Falstaff; Violin Concerto; Dream Of Gerontius; Grainger In A Nutshell;Lincs Posy;Warriors; Country Gardens;Train Music; Pagodes (Debussy arr Grainger); Les Valley Des Cloches (Ravel arr Grainger); Holst The Planets; Kmussen Flourish With Fireworks; Mathews Pluto The Reniewer; Maw Odyssey; Turnage Three Screaming Popes; Drowned Out; Kai;Momentum;Ceres; Vaughan Williams Lark Ascending;Songs Of Travel; On Wenlock Edge; Walton Symphony No. 1; Belshazzar's Feast; Cello Con.	Nigel Kennedy, Lyn Harrell, Julian Bream, Thomas Allen, Thomas Hampson, John Shirley Quirke, Janet Baker, John Mitchison, Robert Tear City of Birmingham Symphony Orchestra & Chorus; Berliner Philharmoniker, Rundfunkchor Berlin, Cleveland Orchestra Chorus Birmingham Contemporary Music Group	11
Benjamin Britten	American Overture Ballad Of Heroes Op. 14 1–3; Canadian Overture; Diversions for Piano & Orchestra (Left hand) 1–11; Occasional Overture; Praise We Great Men; Quatre Chansons Franaises; Scottish Ballad Op. 26; Sinfonia De Requiem; Suite On English Folk Tunes; A Time There Was... The Building of The House; Overture; War Requiem; Young Apollo; Russian Funeral; Young Persons Guide to the Orchestra; Nocturne; Les Illuminations; Serenade;For Tenor, Horn & Strings	Ian Bostridge/Robert Tear (tenors); Thomas Allen (Baritone)Willard White (bass) Jill Gomez/ Elizabeth Soderstrom (sopranos); Peter Donahoe/Philip Fowke (pianos); City of Birmingham Symphony Orchestra; Berliner Philharmoniker	5
Claude Debussy Maurice Ravel	Musique pour Le Roi Lear (Orch. Roger-Ducasse); Jeux; Images; Iberia; Estampe No. 1; Prélude à l'après-midi d'un faune; La Mer; Le Boite A Joujoux (Orch. Caplet); Three Preludes (Orch. Matthews); Fanfare from L'Eventail de Jeanne; Shéhérazade; Miroirs Nos. 4 & 5; Ma Mère l'Oye; La Valse; Daphnis et Chloé; Boléro; Piano Concerto, "For the Left Hand" (Gavrilov); Piano Concerto, "For the Left Hand" (Ousset); Piano Concerto in G Le Jardin féerique	City of Birmingham Symphony Orchestra; Berliner Philharmoniker; City of Birmingham Symphony Orchestra; Andrei Gavrilov, London Symphony Orchestra; Cécile Ousset, City of Birmingham Symphony Orchestra; Berliner Philharmoniker	5
Gustav Mahler	Symphonies Nos. 1–4, 6–8; Das Lied von der Erde; Das Klagend Lied; Des Knaben Wunderhorn; Symphonies Nos. 5 & 10 (Cooke); Symphony No. 9	City of Birmingham Symphony Orchestra; Berliner Philharmoniker; Wiener Philharmoniker	14
Russian Music	Mussorgsky Pictures at an Exhibition (Orch. Ravel) Borodin Symphony No. 2/Polovtsian Dances; Rachmaninov Symphony No. 2/Vocalise/Piano Concerton No. 2 Rhapsody On A Theme By Paganini/Symphonic Dances; Shostakovich Symphonies Nos. 1, 4, 10, 14; Prokofiev Symphony No. 5/Scythian Suite/Piano Concerto No. 1 Gubaidulina Zeitesstalten (excerpt)	Karita Mattila, Thomas Quastoff, Andre Gavrilov (pf)Cecile Oussett (pf) LSO/CBSO/Berlin PO/Phil O/Los Angeles PO	8
Second Viennese School	Schoenberg Gurreleider/Chamber Symphony No. 1/Ewartung/Variations for Orchestra; 5 Orchestral Pieces Op. 16/A Survivor From Warsaw (Brahms arr. Schoenberg) Piano Quartet No. 1 Webern 5 Orchestral Pieces Op. 10 (Nos. 3–5); 6 Orchestral Pieces Op. 6 Berg Lulu Suite/Violin Concerto (conclusion)	Gidon Kremer (violin) Arleen Auger, Thomas Quastoff, Karita Mattila CBSO, BCMG, Berlin PO, Rundfunkchor Berlin	5
Jean Sibelius	Symphonies Nos. 1–7; Kuoleme; The Oceanides; Violin Concerto in D minor Night Ride and Sunrise	City of Birmingham Symphony Orchestra; Nigel Kennedy, City of Birmingham Symphony Orchestra; Philharmonia Orchestra	5
Igor Stravinsky	The Firebird; Scherzo a la Russe (for jazz band); Scherzo a la Russe (for orchestra) 4 Studies; Apollo; Rite Of Spring; Petrushka; Symphony of Wind Instruments; Symphony in 3 Movements; Pulcinella; Suites 1 & 2; Ebony Concerto; Ragtime; Agon (excerpts)	City of Birmingham Symphony Orchestra; London Sinfonietta; Berlin Philharmonika; Northern Sinfonia; Peter Donahoe (piano)	4
Karol Szymanowski	Symphonies 3 & 4; Violin Concertos 1 & 2 King Roger; Litany To The Virgin Mary; Orchestral Songs; Stabat Mater; Harnasie	City of Birmingham Symphony Orchestra & Chorus; Thomas Zehetmair, Thomas Hampson, Phillip Langridge; Elzbieta Smytka	4

== DVDs ==
- Bach:St Matthew Passion
  - Directed by Peter Sellars
  - Magdalena Kožená, Christian Gerhaher, Thomas Quasthoff and Mark Padmore/Rundfunkchor Berlin
    - Recording from 11 Apr 2010
- Bonus: Peter Sellars and Simon Halsey in conversation.
- The recording of the concert was originally produced for the Digital Concert Hall, the Berliner Philharmoniker’s video platform on the Internet, and is now released on the Berliner Philharmoniker’s own label. Both the DVD and the Blu-ray editions contain a wealth of bonus material, including extensive booklets with introductory texts, biographies and many colour photos. The audiovisual extras also include an extensive interview with Peter Sellars and Simon Halsey, director of the Rundfunkchor Berlin.
- Trip To Asia
  - Documentary about the Berlin Philharmonic on tour (2009)
- Gershwin:Porgy and Bess
  - The 1993 BBC/Primetime Television production shown on PBS, adapted from the 1989 Glyndebourne staging, directed by Trevor Nunn
- Leaving Home
- From the channel 4 series 7DVD box set.
  - Vol 1 – Colour
  - Vol 2 – The American Way
  - Vol 3 – After The Wake
  - Vol 4 – Dancing On A Volcano
  - Vol 5 – Rythmn
  - Vol 6 – Three Doorways Through A Dark Landscape
  - Vol 7 – Threads
- Cologne Music Triennale
- Messiaen
  - Éclairs sur l'au dela
- Henze
  - A Tempest
- Holt
  - Sunrise, Yellow Noise Soloist Lisa Milne CBSO
- Mahler/Ades(Inaugural Concert with Berlin Philharmoniker) EMI
- Mahler
  - Symphony 5
- Ades
  - Asyla
- Rattle conducts Carmina Burana
- Orff:
  - Carmina Burana
- Beethoven:
  - Leonore Overture No. 3, Op. 72b
- Handel:
  - Messiah: Hallelujah Chorus arr. Goossens
- Sally Matthews (soprano), Lawrence Brownlee (tenor), Christian Gerhaher (baritone)
- Recorded 31 December 2004 at the Philharmonie Berlin.
- Falla: Noches en los jardines de Espana
- Albéniz:
  - Navarra
- Debussy:
  - Préludes – Book 2: No. 3, La Puerta del Vino
  - Estampe No. 2 – La soirée dans Grenada
- Falla:
  - Noches en los jardines de Espana
  - Homenaje a Debussy
  - Fantasía Bética
- Granados
  - Goyescas: Quejas ó La Maja y el Ruiseñor
- Ravel
  - Gaspard de la Nuit
  - Valses nobles et sentimentales
- plus:
- Alexander Scriabin
  - Nocturne
  - Berliner Philharmoniker, Sir Simon Rattle.
  - Joaquín Achúcarro (piano)
  - recorded in Berlin, at Berliner Philharmonie, September 7, 2010 Blu-ray & DVD
- EUROPA KONZERT 2011 from Madrid
- Joaquín Rodrigo
  - Concierto de Aranjuez (Cañizares flamenco guitarist)
- Emmanuel Chabrier
  - España
- Sergey Rachmaninov
  - Second Symphony

(Recorded live at Teatro Real, Madrid, 1 May 2011 DVD & Blu-ray)

- Sophia – Biography of a Violin Concerto
  - A Jan Schmidt-Garre Film
  - with Sofia Gubaidulina, Anne-Sophie Mutter & Gidon Kremer
  - Berlin Philharmonic, Sir Simon Rattle
- Waldebuhne in Berlin 1995 American Night
- Bernstein
  - candide ovt
  - Prelude, fugue riffs
- Gershwin
  - Rhapsody in Blue
  - Highlights from Porgy & Bess
  - Someone to watch over me
  - I got rhythm
- Lincke
  - Berliner Luft
- European Concert
- Brahms
  - Piano Concerto No. 1
  - Piano Quartet No. 1 (Orch. Schoenberg), Barenboim (piano) BPO
- Henze Memoirs of an outsider: portrait and concert
  - Excerpts with Rattle & other conductors contribution by Rattle and the CBSO
- The Rite of Spring: A silent film to the music of Stravinsky
- A film by Oliver Hermann features the music played by the Berlin phil conducted by Rattle.
- Bernstein
  - Wonderful Town BPO
- Wagner – Die Walküre
  - Sir Simon Rattle / Berlin Philharmonic Orchestra (Willard White / Eva-Maria Westbroek / Eva Johansson / Robert Gambill) [DVD & Blu-ray] 2 discs [2006]
- Story of the Berlin Philharmonic
  - contributions from Haitink/Rattle/Norrington/Abbado etc. BPO
- William Walton – At Haunted End Day
  - A centenary celebration of the life and work of British composer William Walton with a video release of a 'South Bank Show' special in 1981. Includes interview footage with William Walton and performances featuring Simon Rattle and Yehudi Menuhin.
- Maw, Nicholas
  - Sophie's Choice
  - Angelika Kirchschlager, Gordon Gietz, Rod Gilfry, Dale Duesing; Orchestra of the Royal Opera House/Simon Rattle; Royal Opera
  - Chorus/Terry Edwards; dir. Trevor Nunn (London, 2002)
  - Running Time: 223 mins (2 discs)
  - Label:Opus Arte
- Gala Concert 2007BPO released 2009) DVD & Blu-ray
- Mussorgsky
  - Pictures At An Exhibition
  - Khoavanschina Prelude
- Borodin
  - Symphony No. 2
  - Prince Igor:Polovtsian dances
- The Berliner Philharmoniker's European Concert, 1 May 2008 in Moscow's Tchaikovsky Conservatory.
- Stravinsky
  - Symphony in Three Movements
- Bruch
  - Concerto for Violin No. 1, Op. 26 Featured soloist Vadim Repin (violin)
- Beethoven
  - Symphony No. 7 in A major, Op. 92
- Berlin Waldbuhne 2009. Russian Rhythmsconductor Sir Simon Rattle, the Berliner Philharmoniker
- Tchaikovsky
  - The Nutcracker, Op. 71
  - Overture
  - The Christmas Tree
  - March
  - Pas de deux (Intrada)
- Rachmaninoff
  - Piano Concerto No. 3 in D minor, Op. 30 Yefim Bronfman (piano)
- Stravinsky
  - Le Sacre du printemps
- Lincke
  - Berliner Luft
- From a live concert recorded in 1993 with the Berlin Philharmonic. Released 2009. DVD
- Rameau
  - Les Boreades
- Berlioz
  - La Symphonie Fantastique

Live from Kabelwork Berlin Berlin Philharmoniker conducted by Sir Simon Rattle. Released 2010.

- Brahms
  - Symphony No. 4
  - Double Concerto Truls Mork (Cello)
- Wagner
  - Prelude to Parsifal
- 5 Operas From Glyndebourne
- with designs by Maurice Sendak. 3 DVD set. NVC/Warner Classics. Released 2010.
- Ravel
  - L'enfant et les sortilèges Cynthia Buchan. London Philharmonic, Simon Rattle
