= Alén Diviš =

Czech illustrator and painter (1900–1956)

- Solitude
- Born: 26 April 1900; Blato u Poděbrady, Bohemia, Austrian Empire
- Died: 15 November 1956 (aged 56); Prague, Czechoslovakia
- Known for: Painting

Alén Diviš (26 April 1900 – 15 November 1956) was a Czech painter known for his melancholic art. Having spent much of his life abroad, often working in solitude, he remained rather unknown during his life but has had a postmortem revival in the art world.

== Early life and career ==
Diviš was born in Blato u Poděbrady but in 1911, his family moved to Prague. It was there that Diviš first received painting lessons, briefly attending the College of Applied Arts. In his early 20s, Diviš became intensely focused on art, particularly with the cubist movement. In the summer of 1926, he moved to Paris to devote himself fully to his art. There he attended lectures by František Kupka and explored cubism, expressionism, and classicism. He made new friends in the French artistic community and maintained friendships with other Czechs there, such as composer Bohuslav Martinů. He began to travel further abroad, making trips to Spain, South Africa and the Netherlands. The first exhibition of his work took place in 1932 at Van Leer gallery.

== Imprisonment ==
In 1939, in reaction to the German occupation of Czechoslovakia, Diviš became increasingly political and, with other expatriates, formed the House of Czechoslovak Culture. Upon France's entry into the Second World War, Diviš and other members of the organization were arrested and charged with espionage. The reason for the arrests is unclear; perhaps their "sympathies for communism" caused suspicion, or it may have been their uncommonly celebratory reaction to the outbreak of war (which they hoped would lead to the liberation of Czechoslovakia). Whatever the reason, Diviš would spend the next six months in La Santé Prison, one of France's toughest. The sombre mood and the inscriptions and graffiti on the cell walls would inspire his later artistic vision. The charges of espionage were dropped, but Diviš would spend another year and a half in concentration and internment camps in France, Morocco, and Martinique before his eventual release.

== New York ==
In the early 1940s, Diviš finally found asylum in New York where he continued his work until after the war. His art focused primarily on his time in prison, and used images of cell wall graffiti, dreams and dark hallucinations that came with isolation – a style which would later be termed Art Brut or Outsider Art. He worked on parallel sets of painting, and also landscapes of South Africa, where he had travelled before the war. While in the United States, Diviš established links with the local Czech community and was reunited with his friend Martinů. Although his work gained some attention in New York, he was unable to arrange an exhibition of his work.

== Return to Czechoslovakia ==
In 1947, after the end of the Second War and the liberation of Czechoslovakia, Diviš returned to his native country, more than two decades after he had first left for Paris. Upon his return, he achieved a brief period of success. His written memoirs of Santé were published in a weekly paper, and in February 1948, his recent work was exhibited in Prague. The same month, however, brought the Communist coup d'état which would marginalize artists of his type out of work. He spent the rest of the decade producing illustrations for Karel Jaromír Erben's mid-19th century collection of ballads "Kytice", but only "Svatební košile" (Wedding Shirt) was published (in 1952). He also produced a series of illustrations for short stories by Edgar Allan Poe.

In the 1950s, under the harsh conditions of communism in Czechoslovakia, Diviš gave up seeking exposure for his work and focused on spiritual images, such as Christ's crucifixion and bible stories, unlikely to be published By the time of his death, he and his art were almost entirely forgotten. Only his friends, such as sculptor Hedvika Zaorálková, remembered him and preserved his work, which was rediscovered in the 1980s.
