= Miletín =

- Town
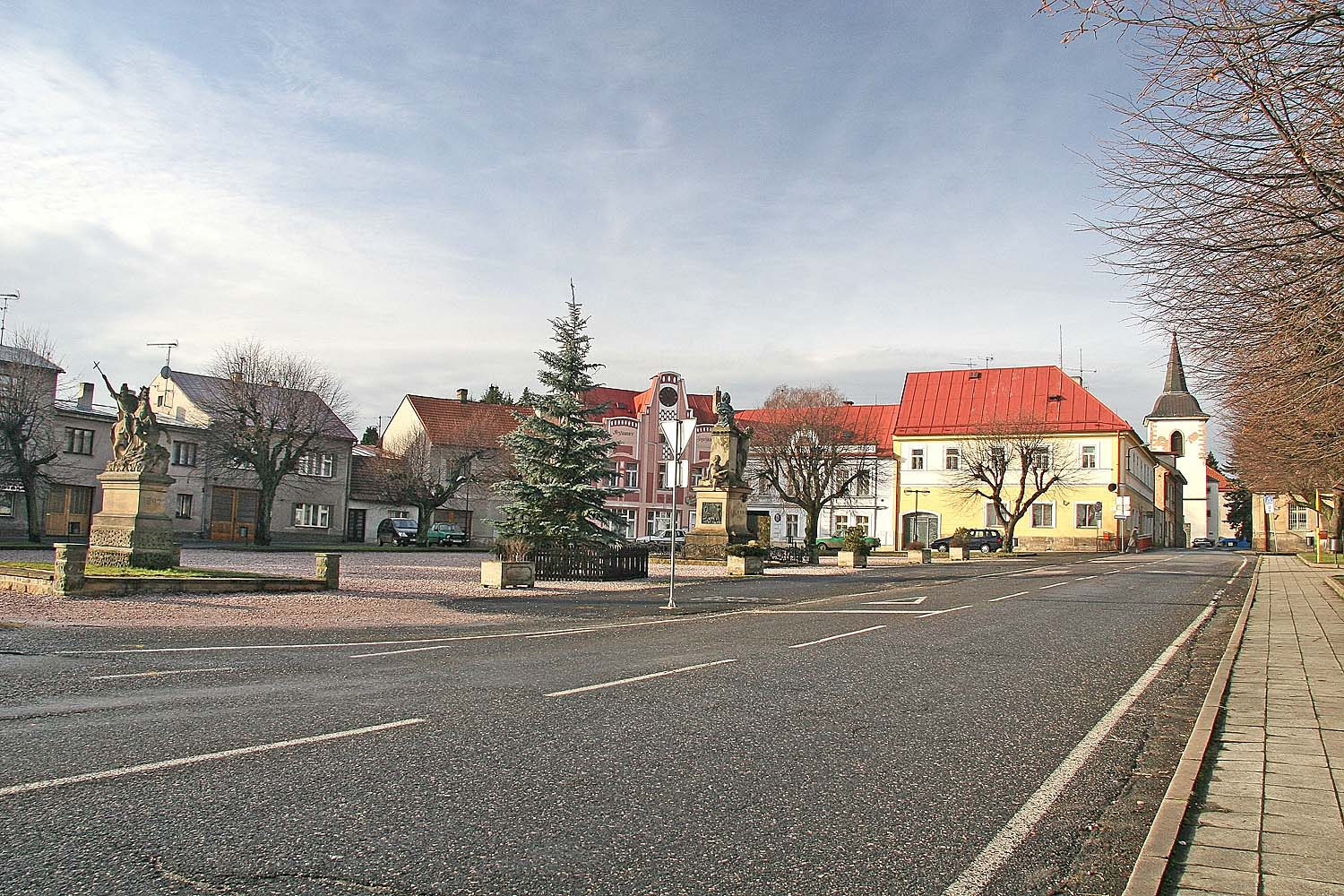
- K. J. Erbena Square

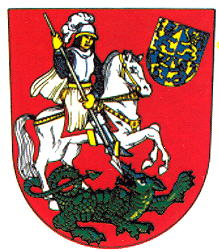
- Flag Coat of arms

- Location in the Czech Republic
- Coordinates: 50°24′14″N 15°40′56″E
- Country: Czech Republic
- Region: Hradec Králové
- District: Jičín
- First mentioned: 1124

Government
  - Mayor: Miroslav Nosek

Area
  - Total: 8.93 km^{2} (3.45 sq mi)
- Elevation: 334 m (1,096 ft)

Population (2026-01-01)
  - Total: 951
  - Density: 106/km^{2} (276/sq mi)
- Time zone: UTC+1 (CET)
  - Summer (DST): UTC+2 (CEST)
- Postal code: 507 71
- Website: www.miletin.cz

Miletín (Czech pronunciation: [ˈmɪlɛciːn]) is a town in Jičín District in the Hradec Králové Region of the Czech Republic. It has about 1,000 inhabitants.

== Etymology ==
The name is derived from the personal name Milata, meaning "Milata's (court)".

== Geography ==
Miletín is located about 23 kilometres (14 mi) east of Jičín and 23 km (14 mi) northwest of Hradec Králové. It lies mostly in the Jičín Uplands, only the northern part of the municipal territory extends into the Giant Mountains Foothills. The highest point is at 458 m (1,503 ft) above sea level. The Bystřice River flows through the town.

== History ==
The first written mention of Miletín is from 1124. From 1241 to 1410, it was property of the Teutonic Order, then the owners often changed. Among the most notable owners were the Waldstein family. In 1560, Miletín was promoted to a town. In 1846, the almost entire town burned down and had to be rebuilt.

== Demographics ==
Historical population

Year	Pop.	±%
1869	1,873	—
1880	1,779	−5.0%
1890	1,629	−8.4%
1900	1,607	−1.4%
1910	1,739	+8.2%

Year	Pop.	±%
1921	1,526	−12.2%
1930	1,523	−0.2%
1950	1,218	−20.0%
1961	1,231	+1.1%
1970	1,155	−6.2%

Year	Pop.	±%
1980	1,019	−11.8%
1991	944	−7.4%
2001	907	−3.9%
2011	915	+0.9%
2021	902	−1.4%

Source: Censuses

== Transport ==
There are no railways or major roads passing through the municipal territory.

== Sights ==
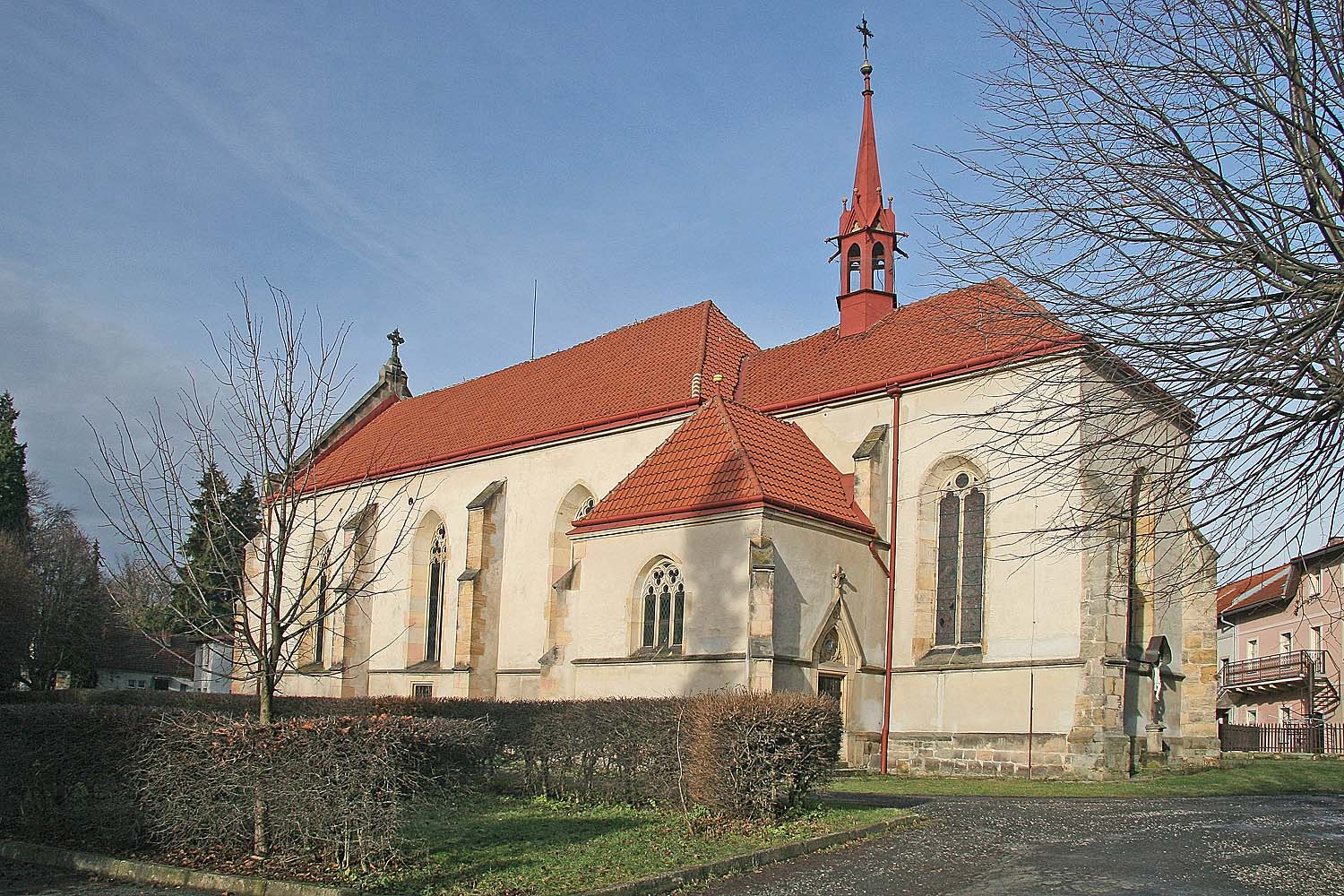
Church of the Annunciation of the Virgin Mary

Among the main landmarks of the town is the Church of the Annunciation of the Virgin Mary. It was built in the Gothic style in the 13th century using material from a Teutonic Order commandery. In 1899, after the church was damaged by the 1846 fire, it was rebuilt in the neo-Gothic style. Next to the church is a separate bell tower.

The Miletín Castle was built in the early Baroque style in 1693, on the site of an old medieval castle. It was rebuilt and a fire in 1699. In the 19th century, it was completely reconstructed. Today it houses the Museum of Czech Amateur Theatre. The castle is surrounded by an English park, founded in 1881.

In the middle of the town square are a large monument of the writer Karel Jaromír Erben (who is the most famous local native) dating from 1892, and a sculptural group of St. George from 1901.

== Notable people ==
- Diviš Bořek of Miletínek (?–1438), Hussite military leader
- Karel Jaromír Erben (1811–1870), folklorist and writer

== Gallery ==
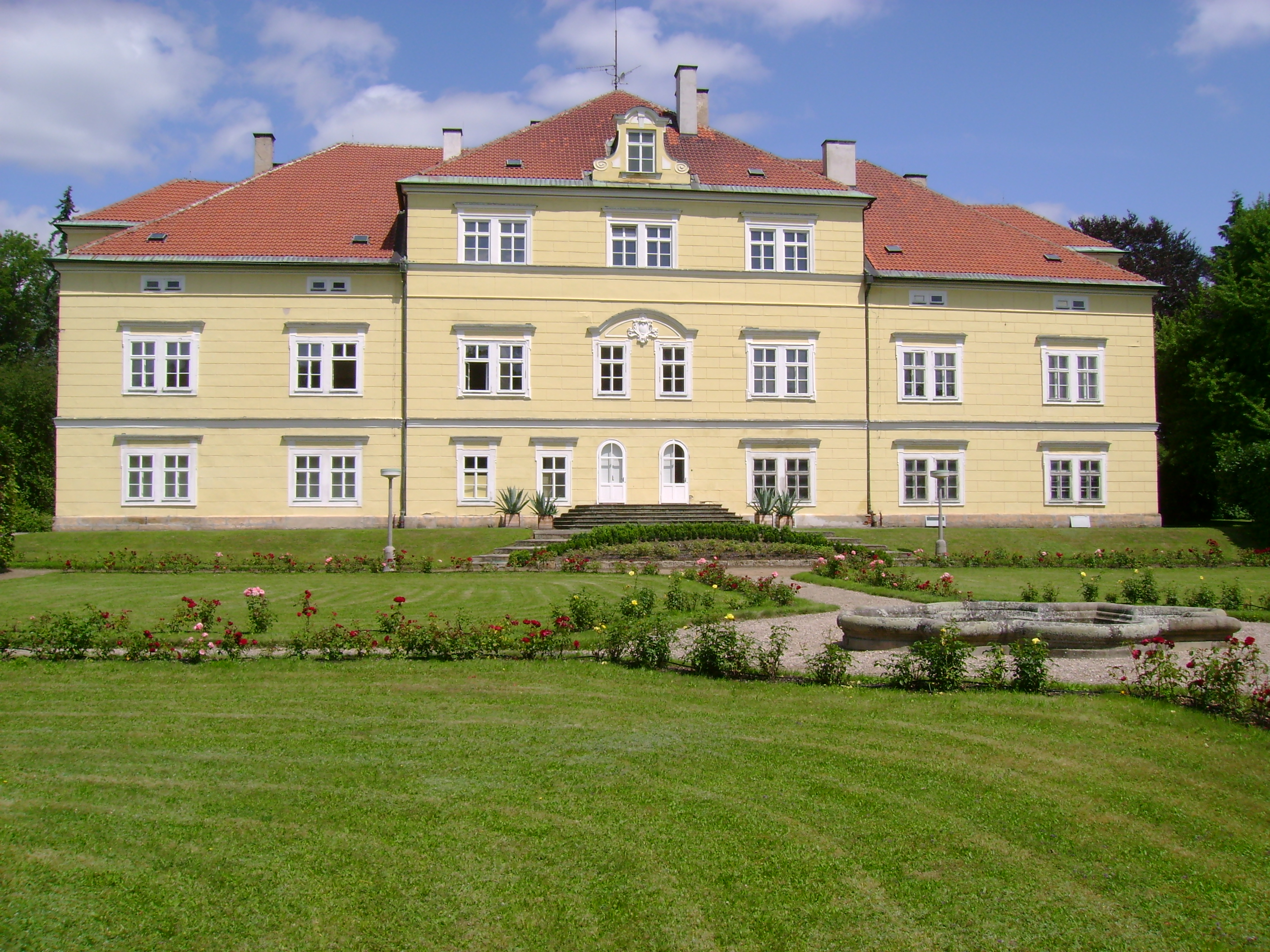
Miletín Castle

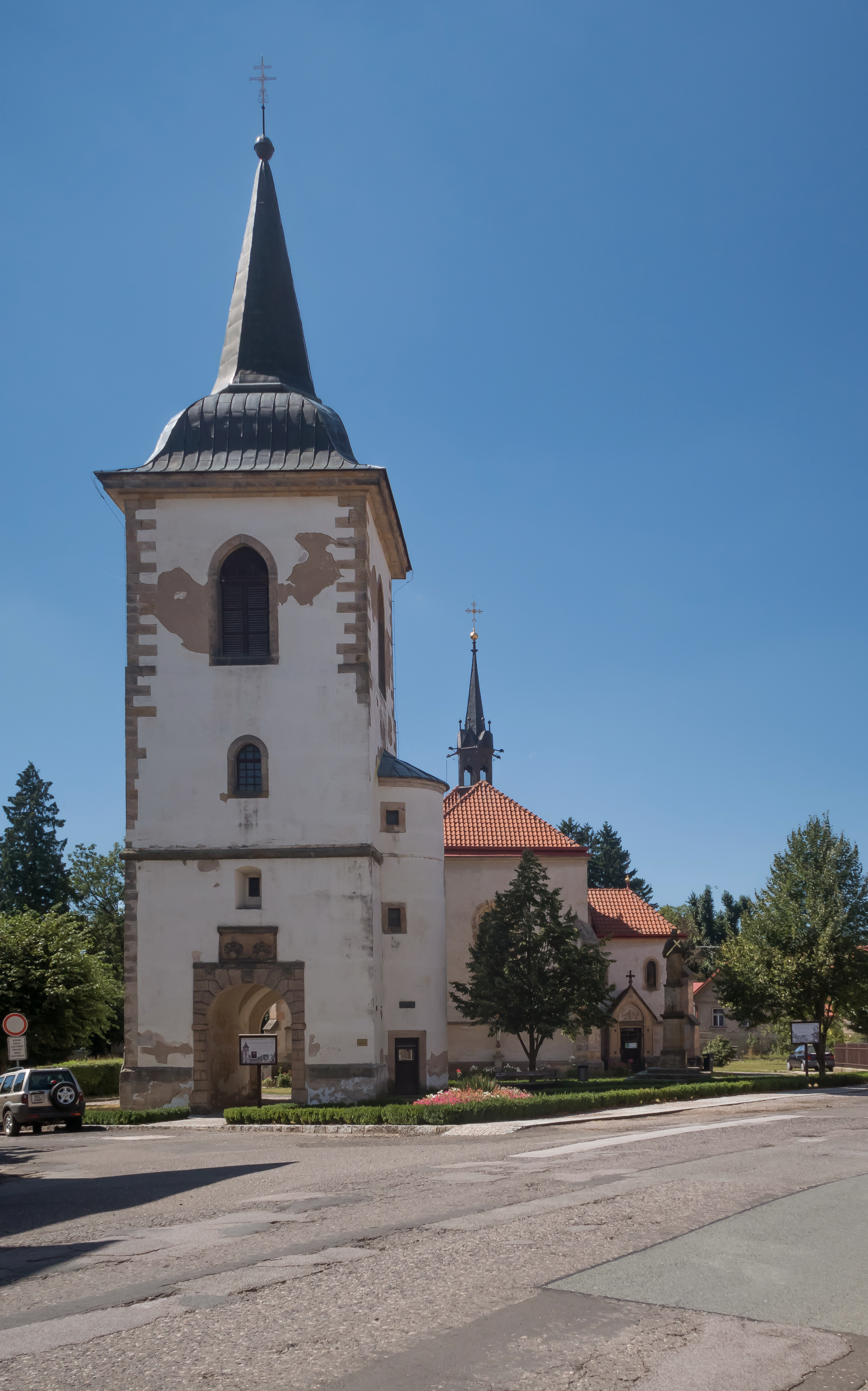
Bell tower

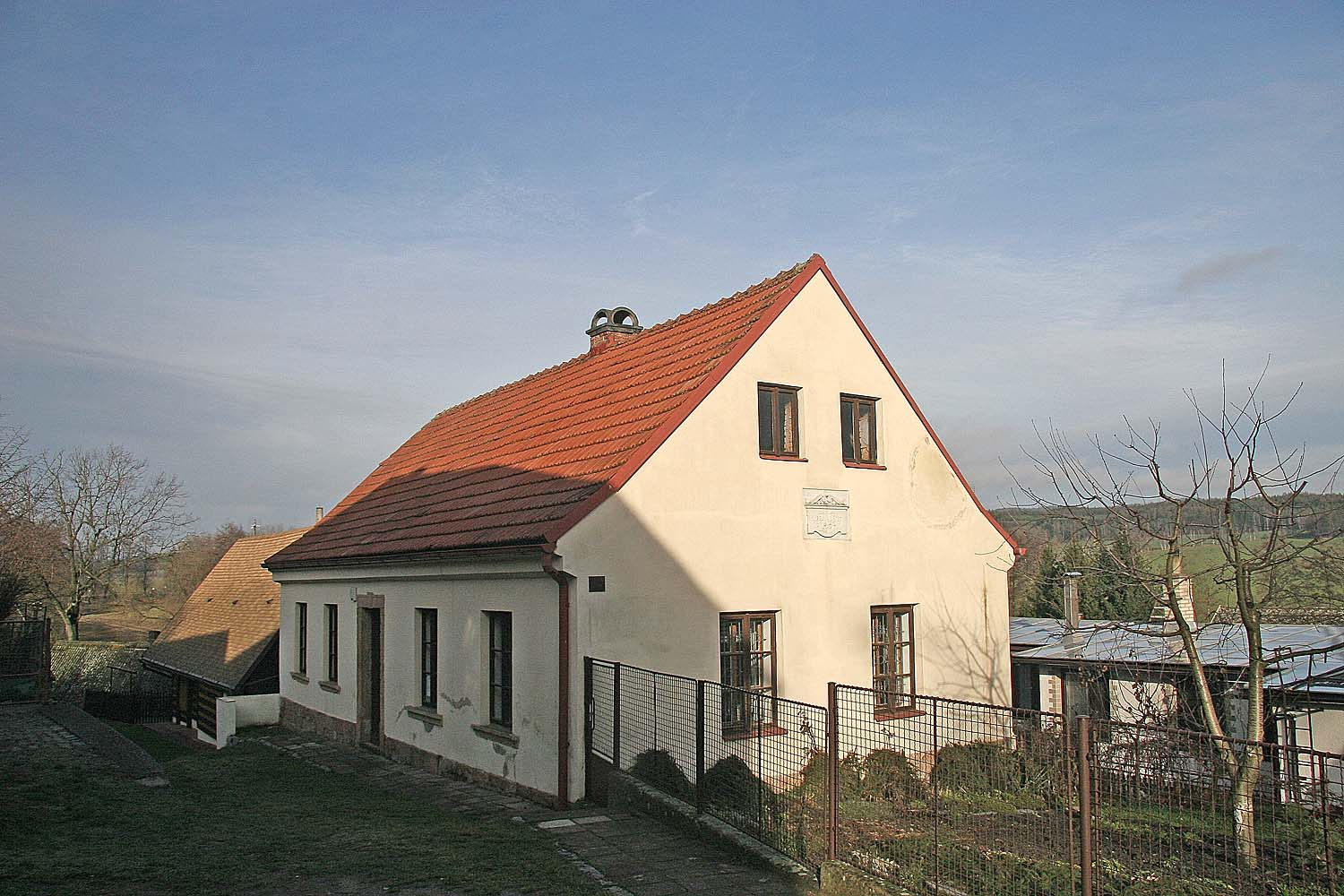
Birthplace of Karel Jaromír Erben
