= Stefan Schweigert =

German bassoonist (born 1962)

- Born: June 15, 1962 (age 64); Kaiserslautern, Germany
- Genres: Classical
- Occupations: Musician, professor
- Instrument: Bassoon
- Member of: Berlin Philharmonic

Stefan Schweigert is a German bassoonist. He has been one of the principal bassoonists of the Berlin Philharmonic Orchestra since 1985.

== Career ==
He began studying the bassoon with Alfred Rinderspacher, later studying at the Hochschule für Musik, Theater und Medien Hannover under Klaus Thunemann.

In 1985, he was appointed principal bassoon of the Berliner Philharmoniker and is a member of the orchestra's chamber ensemble.

He was a professor at the Hochschule für Musik Freiburg from 2004 to 2006, taught for the Berliner Philharmoniker's Karajan Academy since 1987, and has taught masterclasses.

He served as jury member for the International Conductors Competition, held by the Siemens Arts Program and the Karajan Academy.
