= The Noon Witch =

Symphonic poem by Antonín Dvořák

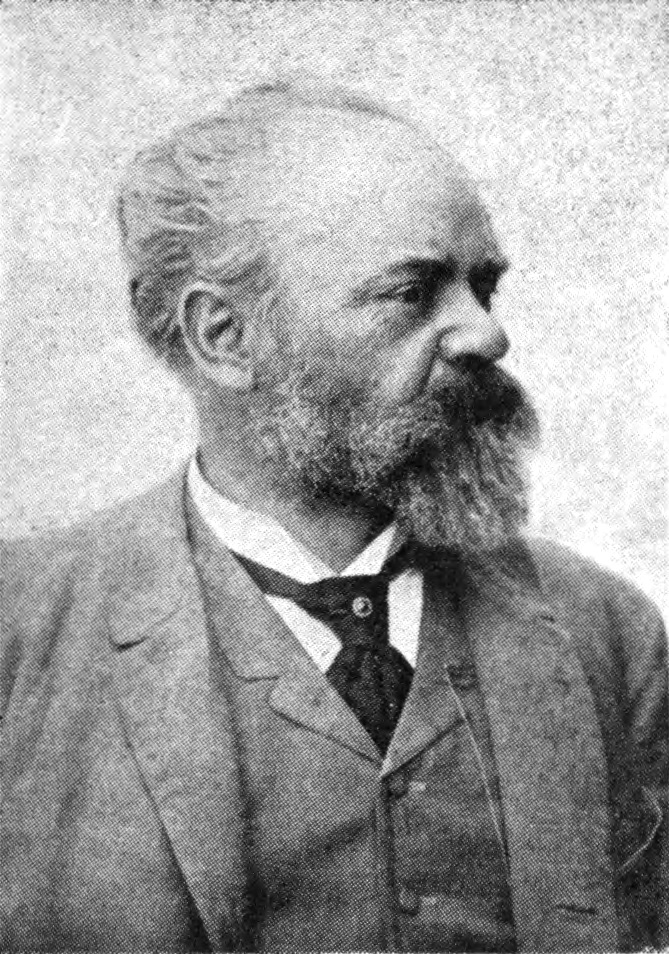
Antonín Dvořák in 1901

The Noon Witch (or The Noonday Witch; Czech: Polednice), Op. 108, B. 196, is a symphonic poem written in 1896 by Antonín Dvořák which was inspired by the Karel Jaromír Erben poem Polednice from the collection Kytice. Polednice is based on the noon demon "Lady Midday" of Slavic mythology. It is one of a set of late orchestral works inspired by national themes which were written after his return to his native Bohemia from the United States.

== Synopsis ==
A mother warns her son that if he does not behave she will summon the Noon Witch to take him away. He does not behave, and the witch arrives at the stroke of noon. The witch, described as a horrible creature, demands the child. The mother, terrified that the witch has actually come, grabs her son, and the witch begins chasing them. Finally the mother faints, grasping her child. Later that day, the father arrives home, and finds his wife passed out with the dead body of their son in her arms. The mother had accidentally smothered their son while protecting him from the witch. The story ends with the father's lament over the terrible event.

== Composition ==
The piece is scored for piccolo, two flutes, two oboes, two clarinets in A, bass clarinet in A, two bassoons, four horns (in F and E), two trumpets in C, three trombones, tuba, timpani, crash cymbals, bass drum, triangle, tubular bells (in C & A), and strings.

Dvořák's music follows the story closely and the orchestration is often used to illustrate characters and events: the oboe and bass clarinet are used to depict the misbehaving child and the witch respectively, whilst twelve strokes of a bell signal the coming of noon. During the witch's chase, the music alternates between two different time signatures as a further dramatic device.

A semi-public performance was given at the Prague Conservatory on 3 June 1896 under Antonín Bennewitz. Its first full public première was on 21 November 1896, in London, under the baton of Henry Wood. The piece lasts about 13 minutes.
