= The Golden Spinning Wheel (Dvořák) =

Symphonic poem by Dvořák

- Symphonic poem by Antonín Dvořák
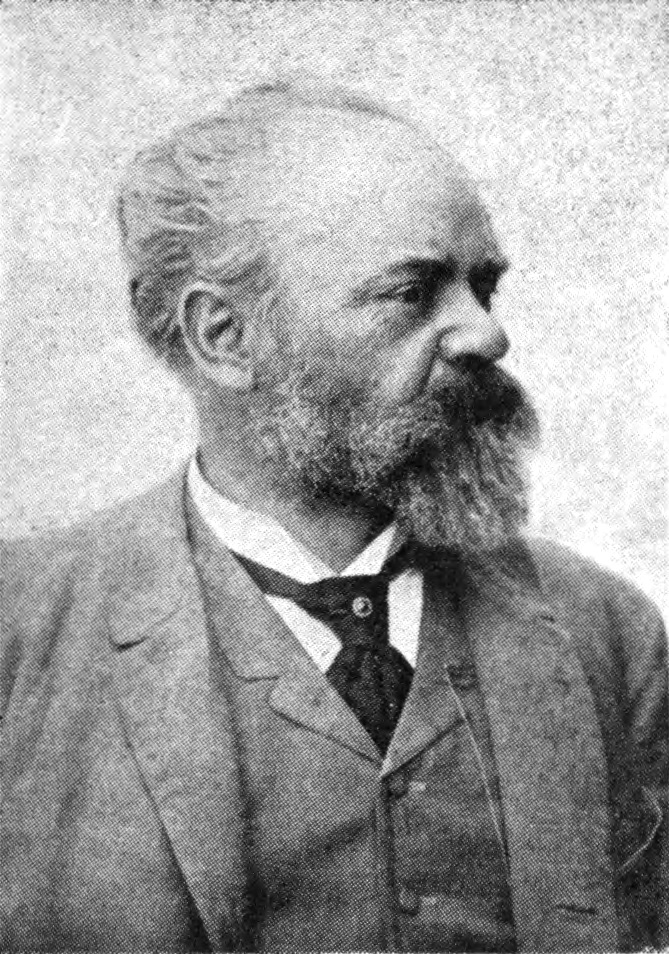
- Antonín Dvořák in 1901
- Native name: Zlatý kolovrat
- Catalogue: B 197
- Opus: 109
- Based on: Poem from Kytice, folk ballads by Karel Jaromír Erben
- Composed: 1896
- Performed: 26 October 1896

The Golden Spinning Wheel (Czech: Zlatý kolovrat), Op. 109, B. 197, is a symphonic poem for orchestra by Antonín Dvořák, composed from January to April 1896. The work is inspired by the poem of the same name found in Kytice, a collection of folk ballads by Karel Jaromír Erben.

A semi-public performance was given at the Prague Conservatory on 3 June 1896 conducted by Antonín Bennewitz. Its first fully public premiere was in London on 26 October 1896, under the baton of Hans Richter.

Dvořák's son-in-law, composer Josef Suk, made a shortened version of the piece. His cuts are taken in Talich's recording and some of them in Chalabala's (where 110 bars are cut after bar 212, and 51 bars cut after 694). The piece is now usually performed complete.

A typical performance lasts approximately 27 minutes.

== Instrumentation ==
It is scored for piccolo, 2 flutes, 2 oboes, cor anglais, 2 clarinets, 2 bassoons, contrabassoon, 4 horns, 2 trumpets, 3 trombones, tuba, timpani, bass drum, cymbals, triangle, harp, and strings.

== Story ==
While out riding in the countryside, a king happens upon a beautiful village girl, Dornička, and falls in love with her. He asks her step-mother to bring her to his castle. The step-mother and Dornička's identically looking step-sister set off towards the king's castle with Dornička. On the way, they murder her, hack off her feet and hands, and cut out her eyes. They bury the body but keep the amputated parts, "lest someone fix them back". The step-sister then poses as Dornička and marries the king, after which he is called away to battle.

Meanwhile, in the midst of the forest, a hermit skilled in magical arts finds Dornička's remains and decides to bring her back to life. He sends a page to the castle to persuade the step-sister to part with "two feet" in return for a golden spinning wheel, "two hands" for a golden distaff, and "two eyes" for a golden spindle. The body complete again, the hermit brings Dornička back to life.

The king returns from battle and bids his wife to spin for him on her new wheel. As she obliges, the magical spinning wheel sings a song betraying the two women's treacherous plot and relaying all the gruesome details of Dornička's murder. The king goes off into the forest to find his true betrothed. The two murderesses are thrown to the wolves, their bodies mutilated in the same way they had mutilated Dornička's. Having fulfilled its task, the golden spinning wheel magically disappears, never to be seen or heard again.

Wikisource has an English translation of the ballad that inspired Dvořák.

== Selected discography ==
- Thomas Beecham conducting the Royal Philharmonic Orchestra; recorded 1947; Dutton (2000); Past Classics (2008)
- Václav Talich conducting the Czech Philharmonic Orchestra; recorded 1949; original release 1951; Supraphon 3827 (2006)
- Václav Neumann conducting the Prague Symphony Orchestra; Supraphon LPV 370 (1960)
- Zdeněk Chalabala conducting the Czech Philharmonic Orchestra; recorded 1961; Supraphon 3056 (1996)
- István Kertész conducting the London Symphony Orchestra; Decca 417596-2 (1970)
- Rafael Kubelík conducting the Bavarian Radio Symphony Orchestra; recorded 1975; Deutsche Grammophon 435074-2 (1992)
- Václav Neumann conducting the Czech Philharmonic Orchestra; recorded 1977; Supraphon SU 0199-2022 (1978)
- Neeme Järvi conducting the Royal Scottish National Orchestra; Chandos 8501 (1987)
- Vernon Handley conducting the Malmö Symphony Orchestra; Big Ben (1989)
- Eliahu Inbal conducting the Philharmonia Orchestra; Teldec 9031-72305-2 (1992)
- Jiří Bělohlávek conducting the Czech Philharmonic Orchestra; Chandos 9048 (1992)
- Stephen Gunzenhauser conducting the Polish National Radio Symphony Orchestra; Naxos 550598 (1993)
- Zdeněk Mácal conducting the Milwaukee Symphony Orchestra; Koss 1026 (1998)
- Nikolaus Harnoncourt conducting the Royal Concertgebouw Orchestra; Teldec 87630 (2003)
- Charles Mackerras conducting the Czech Philharmonic Orchestra; Supraphon SU 3771-2; Supraphon 4012 (2004)
- Theodore Kuchar conducting the Janáček Philharmonic Orchestra, Brilliant Classics 92297 (2004)
- Simon Rattle conducting the Berlin Philharmonic; EMI Classics 58019 (2005)
- Yakov Kreizberg conducting the Netherlands Philharmonic Orchestra; PentaTone PTC5186082 (2009)
