= The Water Goblin =

Symphonic poem by Antonín Dvořák

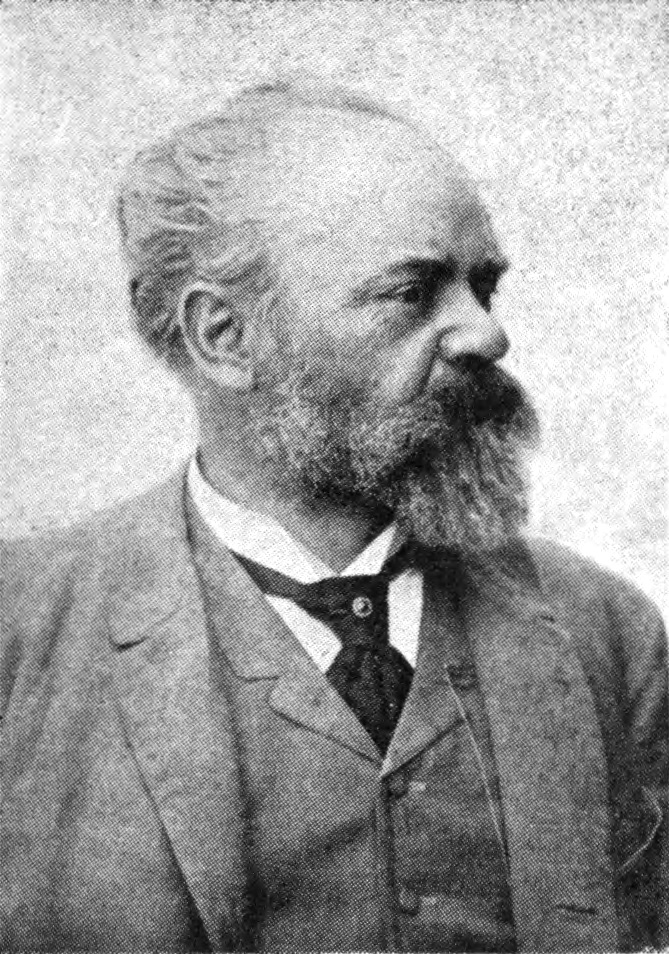
Antonín Dvořák in 1901

The Water Goblin (Czech: Vodník; initially published by N. Simrock with the English title The Water-Fay) is a symphonic poem, Op. 107 (B. 195), written by Antonín Dvořák in 1896.

The source of inspiration for The Water Goblin was a poem found in a collection published by Karel Jaromír Erben under the title Kytice. Four of the six symphonic poems that Dvořák composed were inspired by works of poetry found in that collection.

== Poem ==
Vodník tells a story in four parts of a mischievous water goblin who traps drowning souls in upturned teacups.

1. A water goblin is sitting on a poplar by the lake, singing to the moon and sewing a green coat and red boots for his wedding soon to come.
2. A mother tells her daughter of a dream she had about clothing her daughter in white robes swirling like foaming water and with pearls of tears hiding deep distress around her neck. She feels this dream was a presentiment and warns her daughter not to go to the lake. Despite the mother's warnings, the daughter is drawn to the lake as if possessed and leaves for the lake to do her laundry. The moment she hands down her first garment into the water, the bridge on which she was sitting collapses. As the water engulfs her she is abducted by the malevolent water goblin who lives there.
3. He takes her to his underwater castle and marries her with black crayfish for the groomsmen and fishes for her bridesmaids. After the birth of their first child, the abducted wife sings it a lullaby, which enrages the water goblin. She tries to calm him down and pleads to be allowed ashore to visit her mother once. He gives in on three conditions: She is not to embrace a single soul, not even her mother; she has to leave the baby behind as a hostage; and she will return by the bells of the evening vespers.
4. The reunion of mother and daughter is very sad but full of love. When evening falls the distraught mother keeps her daughter and forbids her to go even when the bells are ringing. The water goblin becomes angry, forsakes his lair in the lake and thumps on the door ordering the girl to go with him because his dinner has to be made. When the mother tells him to go away and eat whatever he has for dinner in his lair, he knocks again, saying his bed needs to be made. Again the mother tells him to leave them alone, after which the goblin says their child is hungry and crying. To this plea the mother tells him to bring the child to them. In a furious rage the goblin returns to the lake and through the shrieking storm screams that pierce the soul are heard. The storm ends with a loud crash that stirs up the mother and her daughter. When opening the door the mother finds a tiny head without a body and a tiny body without a head lying in their blood on the doorstep of her hut.

== Instrumentation ==
The piece is scored for piccolo, two flutes, two oboes, English horn, two clarinets, bass clarinet, two bassoons, four horns, two trumpets, three trombones (alto, tenor, and bass), tuba, timpani, bass drum, cymbals, triangle, tamtam, and strings.

== Composition ==
Dvořák's symphonic piece, which is written in the form of a rondo, follows Erben's written verses remarkably closely; in many places the text fits literally to Dvořák's music. This may well be a result of the fact that Dvořák derived his themes from putting Erben's words to music. This way Dvořák produced seven themes, mostly four bars long for this symphonic poem.

First the water goblin is introduced with a four bar theme starting three repeated notes. These three repeats prove to be vital for the whole composition: Most other themes start with three repeats, the timpani gives a three beat rhythm to the section where the girl wants to go to the lake, the church bells ring three times each at eight o'clock, the water goblin knocks three times on the door.

Second the daughter is introduced with a lovely innocent theme, where the triangle gives her a sparkling twinkle in her eyes. However nice this theme may sound the basis is the same three repeat that formed the basis for the goblin theme. The great difference is in the way they are played: the goblin is in a staccato form presented, where all three notes are short and distinctive of sound, and the girl has a legato played theme, where the three notes are played long, and almost glide over in each other.

The third theme introduces the mother with a suspense theme in B minor which makes the mood even more sad. Again her theme starts with three notes, though the rhythm of the notes is turned around. The suspense is formed by the chromaticism in the secondary theme. Later on Dvořák uses these two themes the other way around, as if the secondary theme becomes the primary, and primary the secondary.

The next section Dvořák changes from the minor to B major to indicate the persistent state of mind of the daughter when she heads off to the lake. In this section an important role has been given to the timpani, who play a solo, even though it is to be played less loud than the rest of the orchestra. They again play the three note repeats, but Dvořák makes a variation on it as well. He changes from three 8th notes to five 16th notes and back and forth and so on. He might have wanted to show the spell the daughter is under, but for sure it makes the coming apocalypse more vivid than if he had only used the original 3 beats. This section ends with a ritardando (slow down), so the listener is prepared for a sudden fast and short swirl in the violins when the bridge cracks.

The next section starts with a sudden E–C–G chord, as the girl hits the water. Dvořák changes key back to B minor for the water goblin theme, and he speeds up the tempo to a lively allegro vivo, which depicts the swirling waters engulfing the girl, for which Dvořák uses as well the Russian device of a descending whole tone scale and the diabolic delight of the water goblin.

The Water Goblin is scored for piccolo, 2 flutes, 2 oboes, cor anglais, 3 clarinets, 2 bassoons, 4 horns, 2 trumpets, 3 trombones, tuba (with optional 2nd tuba part), timpani, bass drum, cymbals, triangle, tam-tam, tubular bells, and strings.

The work had its full public premiere in London by the Queen’s Hall Orchestra, conducted by Henry Wood on 14 November 1896. It had received a semi-public performance on 1 June 1896 at the Prague Conservatory under Antonín Bennewitz.

== Letter to Hirschfeld ==
For the Austrian première in Vienna by the Vienna Philharmonic under Hans Richter on 22 November 1896, Dr. Robert Hirschfeld was asked to write the program notes. For this occasion Dvořák composed a letter stating his intentions and musical solutions for the translation of Erbens poem into music.

- Allegro vivace: The water goblin (flutes) alone.
- Andante sostenuto: The girl (clarinet) and her mother (violins), who tells the girl of a bad dream and warns her not to go near the lake.
- Allegro vivo: The girl ignores the warning (violins and oboes) and falls into the lake, and into the hands of the water goblin.
- Andante mesto come prima: The misery of the underwater world.
- Un poco più lento e molto tranquillo: the girl sings a lullaby for her baby (flute and oboe).
- Andante: The water goblin tells her to stop singing in a fury and they have a quarrel, which ends that the girl is permitted to go visit her mother, but has to be back before the bells of the vespers.
- Lento assai: The girl goes home to her mother (cellos and trombones), where they have a sad reunion.
- Allegro vivace: The storm on the lake, the church bells are heard after which knocking on the door and eventually a loud bang when the goblin throws the dead child against the door.
- Andante sostenuto: croaking frogs (piccolo and flutes), the mother's moaning about that Friday, which was an unlucky day (cor anglais and bass clarinet), the mother's terrible distress (oboes, cellos and basses). The water goblin's mysterious disappearance into the depth of the lake.
