= Kytice =

Cycle of ballads by Karel Jaromír Erben

Kytice z pověstí národních (A Bouquet of Folk Legends), also known by the short title Kytice (Czech for bouquet), is a collection of ballads by the Czech author Karel Jaromír Erben. The collection was first published in 1853 and originally consisted of 12 poems. Lilie was added to the second edition in 1861.

== Poems ==
1. Kytice
2. Poklad (Treasure)
3. Svatební košile (The Wedding Shirt)
4. Polednice (Lady midday)
5. Zlatý kolovrat (The Golden Spinning-Wheel)
6. Štědrý den (Christmas Eve)
7. Holoubek (Little Dove)
8. Záhořovo lože (Záhoř's Bed)
9. Vodník (The Water-Goblin)
10. Vrba (Willow)
11. Lilie (Lily)
12. Dceřina kletba (Daughter's Curse)
13. Věštkyně (Seeress)

== Translations ==
There are two full translations into English in print, Marcela Sulak (2012), A Bouquet of Czech Folktales, Prague, Twisted Spoon Press, and Susan Reynolds (2012), Kytice, London, Jantar Publishing.

Marcela Sulak's translation has been used for subtitling performances of Dvořák's adaptations in Prague and the film version at the Warsaw Film Festival. The edition is illustrated with artwork by Alén Diviš.

Susan Reynolds' translations were years in the making; she had read some of her translations at a symposium at the Antonin Dvořák Museum in Prague in 2004, which were lauded as "brilliant".

Svatební košile was translated under the title "Spectre's Bride" by Josef Štýbr.

== Adaptations ==
The Kytice collection has inspired several adaptations for various media:

Films

- Kytice, a 2000 Czech drama film directed by F. A. Brabec depicting 7 of the poems: Kytice, Vodník, Svatební košile, Polednice, Zlatý kolovrat, Dceřina kletba, Štědrý den
- Svatební košile, a 1978 Czech animated short directed by Josef Kábrt
- Svatební košile, a 1925 Czech film directed by and starring Theodor Pištěk

Music

- Svatební košile (The Spectre's Bride), Ballad for soprano, tenor, bass, chorus and orchestra, Op. 69, B. 135 (1884) by Antonín Dvořák
- Svatební košile (The Spectre's Bride), Ballad for soprano, tenor, bass, mixed chorus and orchestra, H. 214 I A (1932) by Bohuslav Martinů
- Polednice (The Noon Witch, or The Noonday Witch), Symphonic Poem for orchestra, Op. 108, B. 196 (1896) by Antonín Dvořák
- Zlatý kolovrat (The Golden Spinning Wheel), Symphonic Poem for orchestra, Op. 109, B. 197 (1896) by Antonín Dvořák
- Štědrý den, Melodrama for narrator and piano or orchestra, Op. 9, H. 198 (1874, 1899) by Zdeněk Fibich
- Holoubek (The Wild Dove), Symphonic Poem for orchestra, Op. 110, B. 198 (1896) by Antonín Dvořák
- Vodník (The Water Goblin), Symphonic Poem for orchestra, Op. 107, B. 195 (1896) by Antonín Dvořák
- Vodník, Melodrama for narrator and orchestra, Op. 15, H. 267 (1883) by Zdeněk Fibich
- Lilie, Melodrama by Otakar Ostrčil
- Lilie, Melodrama for reciter and piano 4-hands, Op. 23 by Eugen Miroslav Rutte
- Kytice, A Tribute to K. J. Erben (2007) by Libor Tinka

Opera

- Vodník, Opera in 4 acts (1937) by Boleslav Vomáčka; libretto by Adolf Wenig

Theatre

- Kytice, a 1972 loose musical theatre adaptation by Jiří Suchý and Ferdinand Havlík (music), one of the most popular pieces the Semafor theatre
