= The Wild Dove =

Symphonic poem by Antonín Dvořák

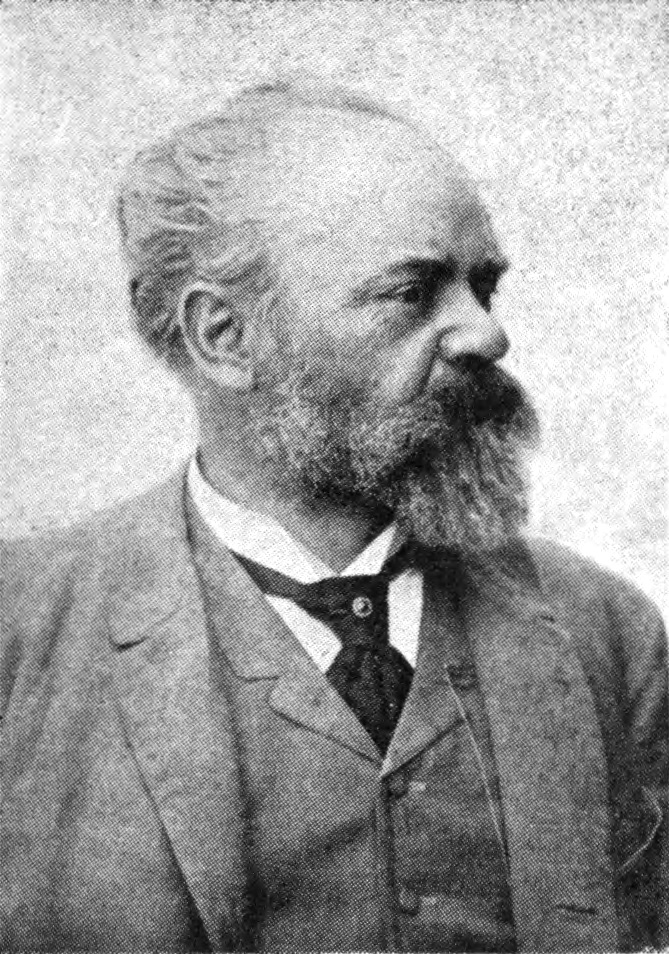
Antonín Dvořák in 1901

The Wild Dove (also known as The Wood Dove; Czech: Holoubek), Op. 110, B. 198 (1896), is the fourth orchestral poem composed by the Czech composer, Antonín Dvořák. Composed in October and November 1896, with a revision in January 1897, the premiere was given on 20 March 1898 in Brno under the baton of Leoš Janáček.

The story is taken from the poem of the same name from Kytice, a collection of ballads by Karel Jaromír Erben. The four musical scenes describe the story of a woman who poisoned her husband and married another man shortly afterwards. A dove then sits on the grave of her dead husband and sings a sad song day after day. The wife feels guilty and commits suicide at the end by jumping and drowning in a river.

== Synopsis ==
A young woman poisons her husband and feigns utter grief at his funeral. Her deception, however, cannot last long. She falls in love with a young man and, within a month, they are married in flamboyant style. One day a wild dove alights on the grave of the dead man and its piteous cooing constantly reminds the woman of her guilt. Finally, unable to bear the weight of her conscience, the murderess takes her own life.

== Performance history ==
The Wild Dove had its first performance on 20 March 1898 in Brno with the Czech Orchestra conducted by Leoš Janáček. Gustav Mahler conducted the second performance in Vienna on 3 December 1899, and its Berlin premiere was on 2 March 1900, with Oskar Nedbal conducting. The earliest recordings date from 1950 (Fritz Lehmann conducting the RIAS Symphony Orchestra Berlin on Urania), and 1951 (Václav Talich conducting the Czech Philharmonic Orchestra on Supraphon).
