= Karel Jaromír Erben =

Czech poet and folklorist (1811–1870)

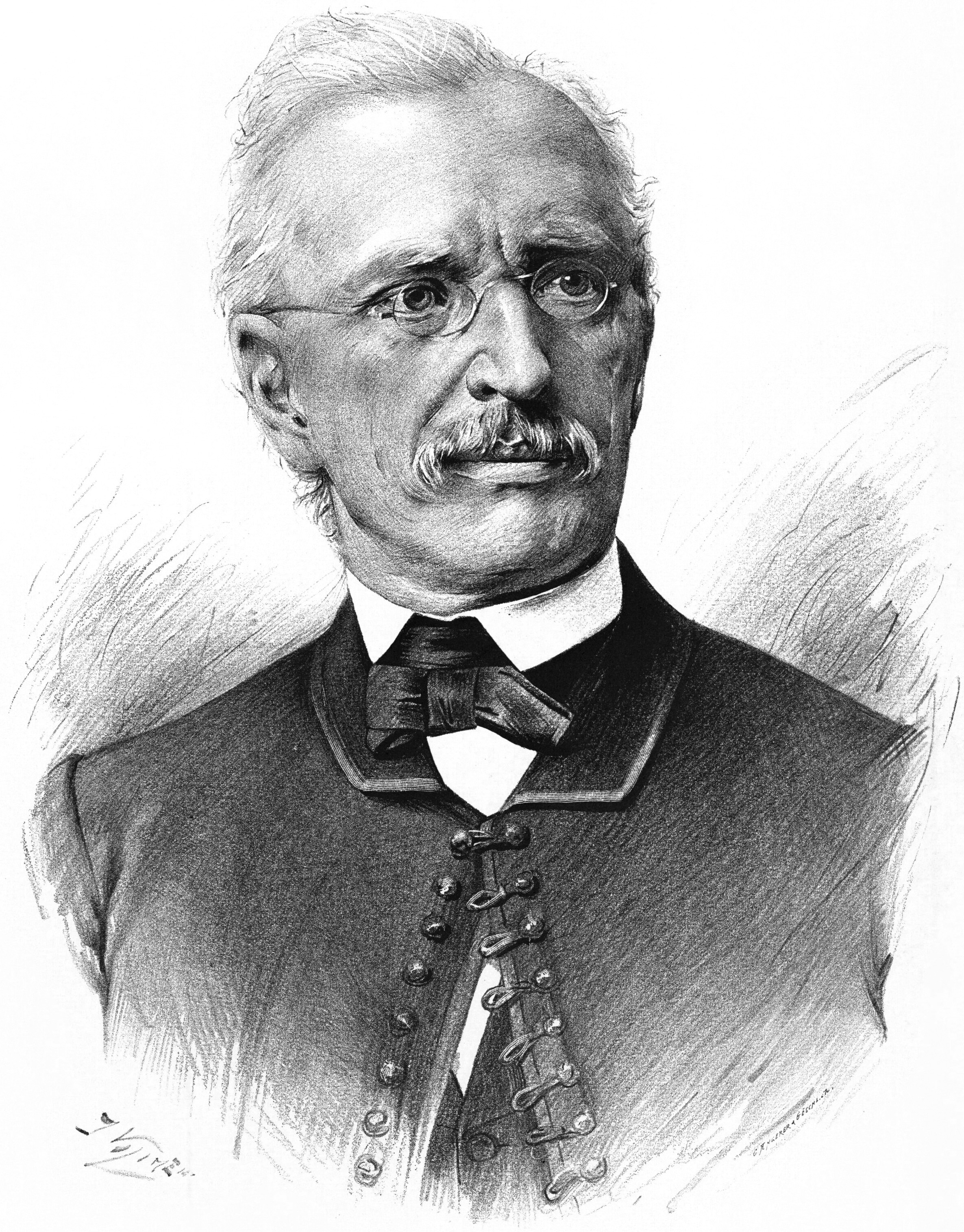
- Born: 7 November 1811; Miletín, Bohemia, Austrian Empire
- Died: 21 November 1870 (aged 59); Prague, Bohemia, Austria-Hungary
- Resting place: Olšany Cemetery
- Occupations: Folklorist; poet; archivist
- Spouse: Barbora Mečířová
- Writing career
- Notable work: Kytice
- Literary movement: Romanticism

Karel Jaromír Erben (Czech pronunciation: [ˈkarɛl ˈjaromiːr ˈɛrbɛn]; 7 November 1811 – 21 November 1870) was a Czech folklorist. He is best known for his collection Kytice, which contains poems based on traditional and folkloric themes. He also wrote Písně národní v Čechách ("Folk Songs of Bohemia") which contains 500 songs and Prostonárodní české písně a říkadla ("Czech Folk Songs and Nursery Rhymes"), a five-part book that brings together most of Czech folklore.

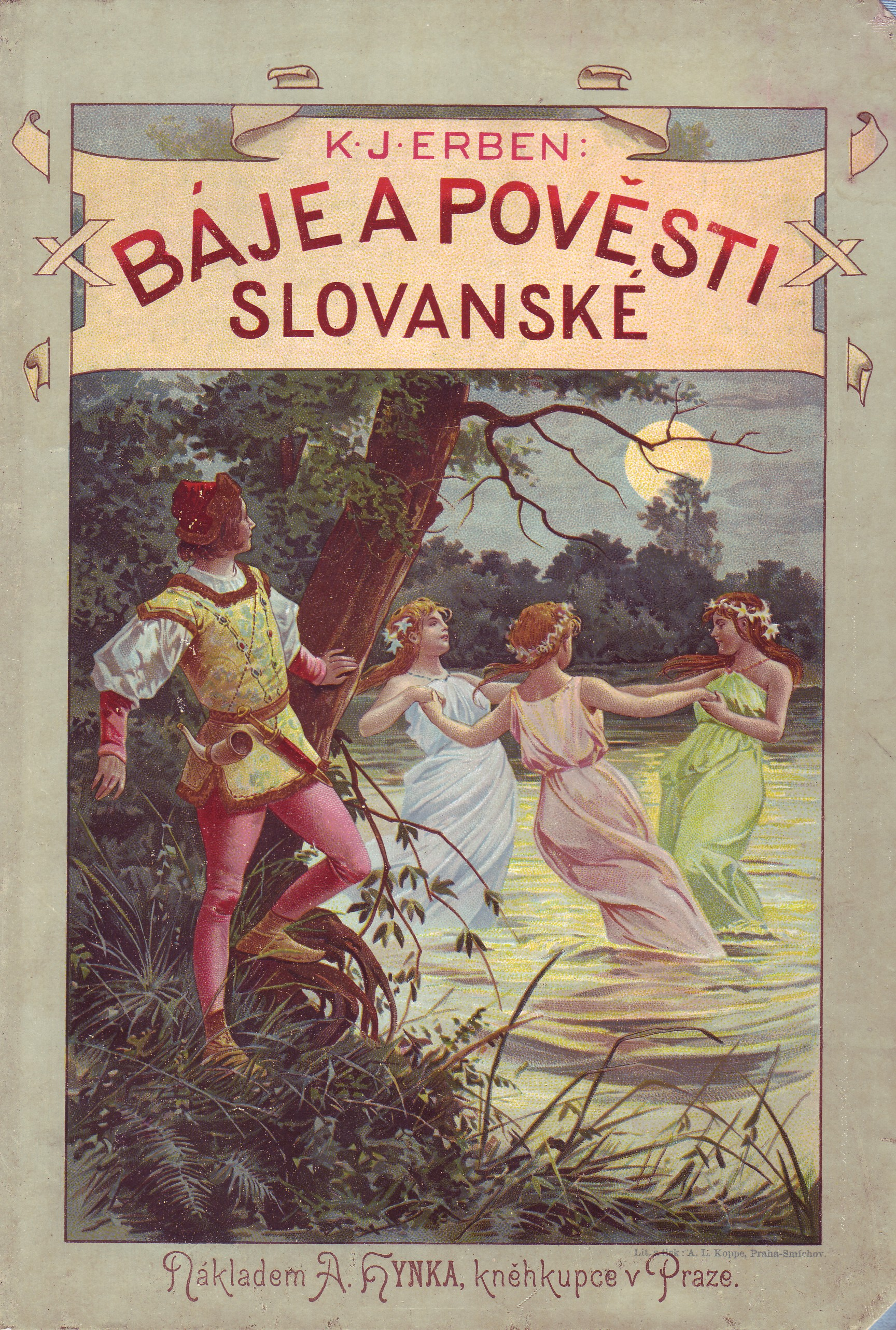
Báje a pověsti slovanské ("Slavic Tales and Legends"), 1902 publication. Cover drawing by Věnceslav Černý.

== Biography ==
He was born on 7 November 1811 in Miletín near Jičín. He went to college in Hradec Králové. Then, in 1831, he went to Prague where he studied philosophy and later law. He started working in the National Museum with František Palacký in 1843. He became editor of a Prague's newspaper in 1848. Two years later, in 1850, he became archives' secretary of the National Museum. He died on 21 November 1870 of tuberculosis.

He was member of the Czech National Revival, and politically he was also a sympathizer of Illyrian movement and Russian Slavophilia for entrenched populations of Slavs in other parts of the world.

As practitioner of his ideals, he published Sto prostonárodních pohádek a pověstí slovanských v nářečích původních ("One Hundred Slavic Folk Tales and Legends in Original Dialects"), also known by its subtitle Čitanka slovanská ("Slavic Reader"), that was influenced by the Grimms' collection of fairy tales. It included such pieces as tale No. 2, Dlouhý, Široký a Bystrozraký ("Long, Broad and Sharpsight", translated into English by Albert Henry Wratislaw). The entire volume was translated by W. W. Strickland, and eventually published as Panslavonic Folk-lore in 1930.

He is also considered an important poet of the Czech literary Romanticism in the mid-19th century, with his collection of a dozen literary ballads entitled Kytice z pověstí národních ("A Bouquet of Folk Legends", 1853).

== Selected works ==
- Písně národní v Čechách (Folk Songs of Bohemia) (1842–1845); contains 500 songs
- Kytice z pověstí národních (A Bouquet of Folk Legends) (1853, expanded edition 1861) (English edition, 2012)
- Sto prostonárodních pohádek a pověstí slovanských v nářečích původních: čitanka slovanská s vysvětlením slov (One Hundred Slavic Folk Tales and Legends in Original Dialects: a Slavic Reader with Vocabulary, 1865)
- Vybrané báje a pověsti národní jiných větví slovanských (Selection of Folk Tales and Legends from Other Slavic Branches) (1869)
- Prostonárodní české písně a říkadla (Czech Folk Songs and Nursery Rhymes) (1864); 5-part collection of Czech folklore
- České pohádky (Czech Fairy Tales)
