= Pierre Monteux discography =

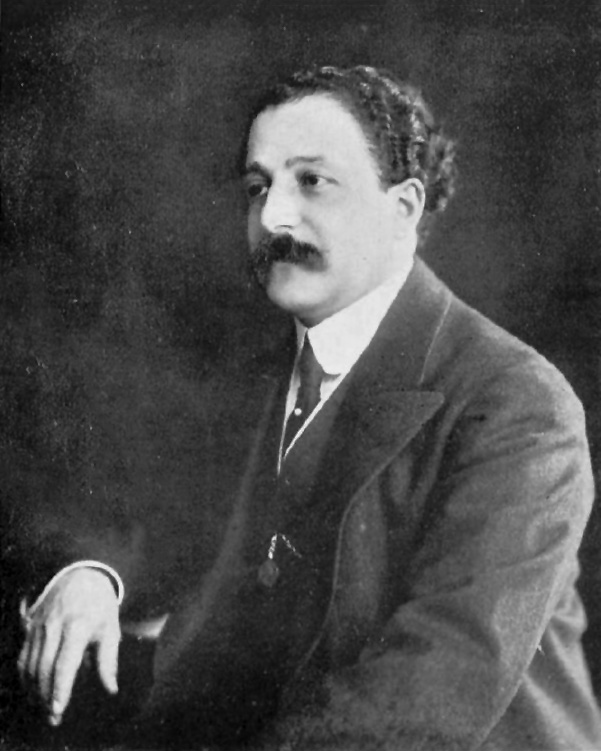
Monteux circa 1912

The conductor Pierre Monteux made a large number of recordings throughout his career. His first recording was as a violist in "Plus blanche que la blanche hermine" from Les Huguenots by Meyerbeer in 1903 for Pathé with the tenor Albert Vaguet. His first recording as a conductor was the first of his five recordings of Stravinsky's The Rite of Spring. His last studio recordings were with the London Symphony Orchestra in works by Ravel at Wembley Town Hall at the end of February 1964. He recorded works by more than fifty composers. However, he disliked recording, saying of studio sessions,

You may give an excellently played, genuinely felt performance of a movement, but because the engineer is not satisfied because there is some rustling at one point, so you do it again and this time something else goes wrong. By the time you get a "perfect" take of the recording the players are bored, the conductor is bored, and the performance is lifeless and boring. … I detest all my own records.

In Monteux's lifetime it was rare for record companies to issue recordings of live concerts, although he would much have preferred it. He said, "if one could record in one take in normal concert-hall conditions". Some live performances of Monteux conducting the San Francisco Symphony and Boston Symphony orchestras survive alongside his studio recordings, and many have been issued on compact disc.

Many of Monteux's recordings have remained in the catalogues for decades, notably his RCA Victor recordings with the Boston Symphony and Chicago Symphony orchestras; Decca recordings with the Vienna Philharmonic; and Decca and Philips recordings with the LSO.

Monteux's recordings include:

Franco Alfano

- “Dieu de grâce” from Résurrection (Dorothy Warenskjold, The Standard Symphony Orchestra (San Francisco), Music & Arts - MACD1192, 13 CDs)

Hendrik Andriessen

- Concerto for Organ (Hendrik Andriessen, Royal Concertgebouw Orchestra - Live 1950)

Johann Sebastian Bach

- Concerto for two violins, BWV 1043 (Yehudi Menuhin, Georges Enesco (Orchestre Symphonique de Paris - 1932)
- Suite No. 2 in B minor (Claude Monteux, London Symphony Orchestra - 1963)
- Christmas Oratorio, BWV248 : Sinfonia (San Francisco SO, 1949)

Ludwig van Beethoven

- Symphony No. 1 (Vienna Philharmonic Orchestra - 1960)
- Symphony No. 2 (San Francisco Symphony Orchestra - 1949, Orchestre National de l'ORTF - Live 1956, North German Radio Symphony Orchestra - 1960, London Symphony Orchestra - 1960)
- Symphony No. 3 (Vienna Philharmonic Orchestra - 1957, Royal Philharmonic Orchestra - 1960, Concertgebouw Orchestra - 1962)
- Symphony No. 4 (San Francisco Symphony Orchestra - 1952, London Symphony Orchestra - 1959, North German Radio Symphony Orchestra - 1960, Israel Philharmonic - Live 1964)
- Symphony No. 5 (The Standard Symphony Orchestra (San Francisco) - Live 1950, Boston Symphony Orchestra - Live 1959, London Symphony Orchestra - 1961)
- Symphony No. 6 'Pastoral' (Vienna Philharmonic Orchestra - 1958, Boston Symphony Orchestra - Live 1959, BBC Northern Symphony Orchestra - Live 1963)
- Symphony No. 7 (NBC Symphony Orchestra - Live 1953; Orchestre National de l'ORTF - Live 1955; London Symphony Orchestra - 1961)
- Symphony No. 8 (San Francisco Symphony Orchestra - 1950, Orchestre National de l'ORTF - Live 1955, Vienna Philharmonic Orchestra - 1959; Chicago Symphony Orchestra - 1961 video)
- Symphony No. 9 'Choral' (Maria Stader, Hélène Bouvier, Libero de Luca, Josef Greindl, Orchestre National de l'ORTF - Live 1958; Elisabeth Söderström, Regina Resnik, Jon Vickers, David Ward, London Symphony Orchestra, Bach Choir - 1962)
- Overture: The Creatures of Prometheus (North German Radio Symphony Orchestra - 1964)
- The Creatures of Prometheus, Op. 43 - suite (Boston Symphony Orchestra - Live 1958)
- The Creatures of Prometheus, Op. 43: Air de Ballet (The Standard Symphony Orchestra (San Francisco) - Live 1944)
- Overture: The Ruins of Athens (San Francisco Symphony Orchestra - 1949)
- Overture: King Stephen (London Symphony Orchestra - 1960)
- Overture: Leonore No. 3 (The Standard Symphony Orchestra (San Francisco) - Live 1952; London Symphony Orchestra - 1959; Berlin Philharmonic Orchestra - Live 1960)
- Overture: Egmont, Op. 84 (The Standard Symphony Orchestra (San Francisco) - Live 1951; London Symphony Orchestra - 1961)
- Overture: Consecration of the House, Op. 124 (The Standard Symphony Orchestra (San Francisco) - Live 1949; Concertgebouw Orchestra - Live 1950)
- Overture: Fidelio, Op. 72c (The Standard Symphony Orchestra (San Francisco) - Live 1944; Boston Symphony Orchestra - Live 1959; London Symphony Orchestra - 1960)
- Piano Concerto No. 5 in E-flat major ‘Emperor’ (Rudolf Serkin, New York Philharmonic - Live 1959)
- Violin Concerto in D major, Op. 61 (Berl Senofsky - violin, Boston Symphony Orchestra - Live 1958)
- Grosse Fuge in B-flat major, Op. 133, orch. Weingartner (Boston Symphony Orchestra - Live 1958)

Hector Berlioz

- Symphonie fantastique (Orchestre symphonique de Paris - 1930; San Francisco Symphony Orchestra - 1945 and 1950; Vienna Philharmonic Orchestra - 1958; North German Radio Symphony Orchestra - 1964)
- Roméo et Juliette (Regina Resnik, André Turp, David Ward, London Symphony Orchestra and Chorus - 1962)
- Roméo et Juliette, Part III (André Vessières, London Symphony Orchestra, BBC Choral Society and Chorus - Live 1961)
- Roméo et Juliette, Op. 17 (excerpts) (The Standard Symphony Orchestra (San Francisco) - Live 1944)
- Overture: Le Carnaval romain, Op. 9, (The Standard Symphony Orchestra (San Francisco) - Live 1946; Chicago Symphony Orchestra - 1961 video)
- Overture: Le Corsaire, Op. 21 (The Standard Symphony Orchestra (San Francisco) - Live 1952)
- Overture: Les Troyens, Prelude (Orchestre symphonique de Paris - 1930; The Standard Symphony Orchestra (San Francisco) - Live 1945; San Francisco Symphony Orchestra - 1945)
- L'Enfance du Christ, Op. 25 – excerpts (The Standard Symphony Orchestra (San Francisco) - Live 1947)
- La Damnation de Faust, Op. 24 (complete) (Régine Crespin, André Turp, Michel Roux, London Symphony Orchestra and Chorus - 1962)
- La Damnation de Faust, Op. 24 (three excerpts) (The Standard Symphony Orchestra (San Francisco) - Live 1944)
- La Damnation de Faust, Op. 24 (Rakoczy March) (San Francisco Symphony Orchestra - 1951; London Symphony Orchestra - 1961)
- Overture: Benvenuto Cellini (Orchestre Symphonique de Paris - 1930; Concertgebouw Orchestra - Live 1939; San Francisco SO - 1945 and 1952)

Alexander Borodin

- Prince Igor: Polovtsian Dances (The Standard Symphony Orchestra (San Francisco) - 1951; North German Radio Symphony Orchestra - 1964)

Johannes Brahms

- Symphony No. 1 in C minor (Concertgebouw Orchestra - Live 1963)
- Symphony No. 2 in D major (San Francisco Symphony Orchestra - 1945 and 1951; Vienna Philharmonic Orchestra - 1959; London Symphony Orchestra - 1962)
- Symphony No. 3 in F major (Boston Symphony Orchestra - Live 1956; Concertgebouw Orchestra - Live 1960; BBC Northern Symphony Orchestra - Live 1962)
- Piano Concerto No. 1 (Leon Fleisher, Boston Symphony Orchestra - Live 1958; Julius Katchen, London Symphony Orchestra - 1959)
- Variations on the St Anthony Chorale (London Symphony Orchestra - 1958)
- Violin Concerto in D major, Op. 77 (Nathan Milstein, Concertgebouw Orchestra - Live 1950; Zino Francescatti, Royal Philharmonic Orchestra - Live 1955; Henryk Szeryng (London Symphony Orchestra - 1958; Leonid Kogan, Boston Symphony Orchestra - Live 1958, Isaac Stern, Boston Symphony Orchestra - Live 1959)
- Double Concerto for Violin, Cello, and Orchestra in A minor, Op. 102 (Zino Francescatti Violin, Pierre Fournier, Cello, Royal Philharmonic Orchestra - Live 1955)
- Tragic overture (The Standard Symphony Orchestra (San Francisco) - Live 1949; Boston Symphony Orchestra, Live 1959; Boston Symphony Orchestra - 1959 video; Concertgebouw Orchestra - Live 1962; London Symphony Orchestra - 1962)
- Academic Festival Overture (Boston Symphony Orchestra - Live 1958; London Symphony Orchestra - 1962)
- Alto Rhapsody (Marian Anderson, San Francisco Symphony Orchestra and Municipal Chorus, 1945)
- Schicksalslied, Op. 54 (Stanford University Choir, San Francisco Orchestra, 1949)
- Chorale Preludes (11), Op. 122 arr. V Thomson (Boston Symphony Orchestra - Live 1959)
- Waltzes (16), Op. 39, five extracts (arr. Alfred Hertz) (The Standard Symphony Orchestra (San Francisco) - Live 1949)

Max Bruch

- Violin Concerto No. 1 (Yehudi Menuhin, San Francisco Symphony Orchestra - 1945)

Emmanuel Chabrier

- Fête Polonaise from Le roi malgré lui (Orchestre Symphonique de Paris - 1930; San Francisco Symphony - 1947; London Symphony Orchestra - Live 1961)

George Chadwick

- Symphonic Sketches: Jubilee (The Standard Symphony Orchestra (San Francisco) - Live 1943)

Ernest Chausson

- Poème de l'amour et de la mer, Op. 19 (Gladys Swarthout, RCA Victor Symphony Orchestra - 1952)
- Poème för violin and orchestra, Op. 25 (Jascha Heifetz, San Francisco Orchestra - 1945)
- Symphony in B-flat, Op. 20 (San Francisco Symphony Orchestra - 1950; BBC Symphony Orchestra - Live 1956)

Luigi Cherubini

- Overture Anacréon (Royal Philharmonic Orchestra - Live 1960)

Piero Coppola

- Interlude dramatique (Orchestre Symphonique de Paris - 1930)

François Couperin, arr. Darius Milhaud

- Excerpts from La Sultane (Orchestre National de l'ORTF - Live 1958)

Claude Debussy

- La mer (Concertgebouw Orchestra - Live 1939; Boston Symphony Orchestra - 1954)
- Prélude à l'après-midi d'un faune (Concergebouw - Live 1950; Boston Symphony Orchestra - Live 1959; London Symphony Orchestra - 1961)
- Images (San Francisco Symphony - 1951; BBC Symphony Orchestra - Live 1956; Orchestre National de l’ORTF - Live 1956; London Symphony Orchestra - 1963)
- Jeux (Orchestre National de l’ORTF - Live 1955)
- Three Nocturnes (Boston Symphony Orchestra - 1955; Boston Symphony Orchestra - Live 1958)
- Nocturnes Nos. 1-2 (London Symphony Orchestra - 1961)
- Le martyre de Saint Sébastien - fragments symphoniques (Roger Lord, London Symphony Orchestra - 1963)
- Le martyre de Saint Sébastien - fragments symphoniques, two movements (Boston Symphony Orchestra - Live 1958)

Léo Delibes

- Coppélia, Suite (Boston Symphony Orchestra - 1953)
- Sylvia, Suite (Boston Symphony Orchestra - 1953)

Paul Dukas

- The Sorcerer's Apprentice (The Standard Symphony Orchestra (San Francisco) - Live 1952; London Symphony Orchestra - 1961 video)

Antonín Dvořák

- Symphony No 7 (London Symphony Orchestra - 1959)

Edward Elgar

- Enigma Variations (Concertgebouw Orchestra - Live 1950; London Symphony Orchestra - 1958 and 1962; Orchestre National de l’ORTF - Live 1958)

Manuel de Falla

- The Three-Cornered Hat – suite (The Standard Symphony Orchestra (San Francisco) - Live 1946; London Symphony Orchestra - Live 1961)

César Franck

- Symphonic Variations for Piano and Orchestra (Robert Casadesus, Boston Symphony Orchestra - Live 1956)
- Symphony in D minor (San Francisco Symphony Orchestra - 1941 and 1950; The Standard Symphony Orchestra (San Francisco) - Live 1946; Orchestre National de l’ORTF - Live 1958; Chicago Symphony Orchestra - 1961)
- Pièce héroïque pour orgue, orch O’Connell (San Francisco Symphony Orchestra - 1941)
- Prélude, Chorale et Fugue, M21 (arr. Gabriel Pierné) (The Standard Symphony Orchestra (San Francisco) - Live 1944)
- Rédemption - Symphonic Interlude (The Standard Symphony Orchestra (San Francisco) - Live 1952)
- Psyché Suite (extracts) (The Standard Symphony Orchestra (San Francisco) - Live 1944)
- Les Éolides M43 (Concertgebouw Orchestra - Live 1939)

Alexander Glazunov

- Scènes de ballet, Op. 52 (The Standard Symphony Orchestra (San Francisco) - Live 1943)

Mikhail Glinka:

- Ruslan and Lyudmila Overture (Boston Symphony Orchestra - Live 1958)

Christoph Willibald Gluck

- Orfeo ed Euridice (Risë Stevens, Lisa Della Casa and Roberta Peters, Orchestra del Teatro dell'Opera di Roma - 1957)
- Orfeo ed Euridice: Dance of the Blessed Spirits (Claude Monteux, London Symphony Orchestra - 1963)
- Iphigénie en Aulide Overture (The Standard Symphony Orchestra (San Francisco) - Live 1945)

Charles Gounod

- Faust Ballet music (San Francisco Symphony Orchestra - 1947)

André Grétry

- Céphale et Procris – Suite (The Standard Symphony Orchestra (San Francisco) - Live 1947)

Louis Gruenberg

- Violin Concerto, Op. 47 (1944) (Jascha Heifetz, San Francisco Symphony Orchestra - 1945)

Joseph Haydn

- Symphony No. 88 in G major (The Standard Symphony Orchestra (San Francisco) - Live 1945)
- Symphony No. 94 in G major (Boston Symphony Orchestra - Live Moscow 1956; Vienna Philharmonic Orchestra - 1959)
- Symphony No. 101 in D major (Vienna Philharmonic Orchestra - 1959)
- Symphony No. 104 in D major (Royal Philharmonic Orchestra - Live 1960)

Paul Hindemith

- Symphony: Mathis der Maler (Danish State Radio Symphony Orchestra - Live 1962)
- Nobilissima Visione (Orchestre National de l’ORTF - Live 1958; Boston Symphony Orchestra - Live 1958; Boston Symphony Orchestra - 1959 video)

Johann Nepomuk Hummel

- Trumpet concerto in E major (Armando Ghitalla, Boston Chamber Ensemble - 1963)

Jacques Ibert

- Escales (San Francisco Symphony Orchestra - 1946)

Vincent d'Indy

- Fervaal, Op. 40 (1896) : Prélude (San Francisco Orchestra - 1945)
- Istar, Variations symphoniques, Op. 42 (1896) (San Francisco Symphony Orchestra - 1945)
- Symphony No. 2, Op. 57 (San Francisco Symphony Orchestra - 1942)
- Symphonie sur un thème montagnard français, Op. 25 (Maxim Schapiro, San Francisco Symphony Orchestra - 1941; Nicole Henriot-Schweitzer, Boston Symphony Orchestra - Live 1959; Valerie Tryon, BBC Symphony Orchestra - Live 1961)

Aram Khachaturian

- Violin Concerto in D minor, (Leonid Kogan, Boston Symphony Orchestra - 1958)

Édouard Lalo

- Le Roi d'Ys (1888) - Overture (San Francisco Symphony Orchestra - 1942)
- Symphonie Espagnole, Op. 21 (Yehudi Menuhin, San Francisco Symphony Orchestra - 1945)

Franz Liszt

- Les Préludes (The Standard Symphony Orchestra (San Francisco) - Live 1950; Boston Symphony Orchestra - 1952)
- Hungarian Rhapsody No. 2 in C-sharp minor, S. 244 (The Standard Symphony Orchestra (San Francisco) - Live 1949)

Gustav Mahler

- Kindertotenlieder (Marian Anderson, San Francisco Symphony Orchestra - 1950)

Jules Massenet

- Manon (Victoria de los Ángeles, Henri Legay, Michel Dens, Orchestre et Chœurs de l'Opéra-Comique, Paris) (1955)
- Phèdre: Overture (The Standard Symphony Orchestra (San Francisco) - Live 1950)

Felix Mendelssohn

- Symphony No. 4 in A major, Op. 90 'Italian' (The Standard Symphony Orchestra (San Francisco) - 1947; Boston Symphony Orchestra - Live 1959)
- Piano Concerto No. 1 in G minor, Op. 25 (Rudolf Serkin - piano, Boston Symphony Orchestra - Live 1959)
- A Midsummer Night's Dream : Overture, Scherzo, Nocturne and Wedding March (Vienna Philharmonic Orchestra - 1957)
- Hebrides Overture, Op. 26 (The Standard Symphony Orchestra (San Francisco) - Live 1949)
- Ruy Blas Overture, Op. 95 (San Francisco Symphony Orchestra - 1947; The Standard Symphony Orchestra (San Francisco) - Live 1949)

Olivier Messiaen

- L'Ascension (San Francisco Symphony Orchestra - 1948; The Standard Symphony Orchestra (San Francisco) - Live 1948)

Darius Milhaud

- Les Euménides: Prelude to Act 3 (Boston Symphony Orchestra - Live 1958)
- Suite symphonique - 2 'Protée', Op. 57 (San Francisco Symphony Orchestra - 1945)

Wolfgang Amadeus Mozart

- Flute Concerto in D major, K. 314 (Claude Monteux, London Symphony Orchestra - 1963)
- Piano Concerto No. 12 in A, K. 414 (William Kapell, The Standard Symphony Orchestra (San Francisco) - Live 1950; Lili Kraus, Boston Symphony Orchestra - 1953)
- Piano Concerto No. 18 in B-flat, K. 456 (Lili Kraus, Boston Symphony Orchestra - 1953)
- Piano Concerto No 24 in C, K. 491 (Robert Casadesus, Orchestre National de l’ORTF - Live 1958)
- Violin Concerto No. 5 in A, K. 219 (Annie Jodry, Orchestre National de l’ORTF - Live 1955)
- Violin Concerto in D major ("Adelaide"), K. Anh. 294a (spurious, Henri Casadesus) (Yehudi Menuhin, Orchestre Symphonique de Paris - 1934)
- Overture: Don Giovanni, K. 527 (The Standard Symphony Orchestra (San Francisco) - Live 1950)
- Overture: Die Zauberflöte, K. 620 (The Standard Symphony Orchestra (San Francisco) - Live 1952)
- Overture: Die Entführung aus dem Serail, K. 384 (The Standard Symphony Orchestra (San Francisco) - Live 1945)
- Symphony No. 35 in D major, K. 385 'Haffner' (The Standard Symphony Orchestra (San Francisco) - Live 1946; North German Radio Symphony Orchestra - 1964)
- Symphony No. 39 in E-flat major, K. 543 (North German Radio Symphony Orchestra - 1964)
- Symphony No. 41 in C major, K. 551 'Jupiter' (The Standard Symphony Orchestra (San Francisco) - Live 1947)

Modest Mussorgsky

- Night on the Bare Mountain (North German Radio Symphony Orchestra - 1964)

Otto Nicolai

- Die lustigen Weiber von Windsor, overture (The Standard Symphony Orchestra (San Francisco) - Live 1950)

Niccolò Paganini

- Violin Concerto No. 1 in D major, Op. 6 (Yehudi Menuhin, Paris Symphony Orchestra - 1934)

Willem Pijper

- Symphony No. 3 (BBC Symphony Orchestra - 1961)

Sergei Prokofiev

- Symphony No. 1, Op. 25 (Orchestre National de l’ORTF - Live 1958)

Maurice Ravel

- Boléro (London Symphony Orchestra - 1964)
- Daphnis et Chloé – complete ballet (Concertgebouw - Live 1955; Royal Opera House Chorus, London Symphony Orchestra - 1959)
- Daphnis et Chloé, Suite No. 2 (San Francisco Symphony - 1946; Royal Philharmonic Orchestra - Live 1960; Israel Philharmonic - Live 1964)
- Ma mère l'oye – complete ballet (London Symphony Orchestra - 1964)
- Pavane pour une infante défunte (London Symphony Orchestra - 1961)
- Rapsodie espagnole (London Symphony Orchestra - 1961; BBC Northern Symphony Orchestra - Live 1963)
- Sarabande de Claude Debussy, orch. Ravel (San Francisco Symphony Orchestra - 1946)
- Shéhérazade (Germaine Moysan, Orchestre National de l’ORTF - Live 1952; Victoria de Los Angeles, Concertgebouw Orchestra - Live 1963)
- Le Tombeau de Couperin (BBC Symphony Orchestra - 1961)
- Miroirs (1905, 1918) - Alborada del gracioso (San Francisco Symphony Orchestra - 1947)
- La valse (Orchestre symphonique de Paris - 1930; San Francisco Symphony Orchestra - 1941; Boston Symphony Orchestra- Live 1958; London Symphony Orchestra - 1964)
- Valses nobles et sentimentales (San Francisco Symphony Orchestra - 1946)

Ottorino Respighi

- Fountains of Rome (The Standard Symphony Orchestra (San Francisco) - Live 1946)
- Pines of Rome (Orchestre National de l’ORTF - Live 1956)
- Passacaglia in do minore di Giovanni Sebastiano Bach (San Francisco Symphony Orchestra - 1949; Boston Symphony Orchestra - Live 1959)
- Ancient Airs and Dances, Suite No. 1, P. 109 (Nos 2, 3, 4) (Stockholm Philharmonic - Live 1961)

Nikolai Rimsky-Korsakov

- Scheherazade (Naoum Blinder, San Francisco Symphony Orchestra - 1942; Hugh Maguire, London Symphony Orchestra - 1957)
- Symphony No. 2 'Antar' Op. 9 (San Francisco Symphony Orchestra - 1946)
- Introduction and Wedding Parade from Le Coq d'Or (San Francisco Symphony Orchestra - 1945; Orchestre National de l’ORTF - 1958; Boston Symphony Orchestra - Live 1959)
- Christmas Eve Suite (The Standard Symphony Orchestra (San Francisco) - Live 1943)
- Russian Easter Festival Overture, Op. 36 (cut) (The Standard Symphony Orchestra (San Francisco) - Live 1952)
- Capriccio espagnol, Op. 34 (The Standard Symphony Orchestra (San Francisco) - Live 1952; North German Radio Symphony Orchestra - 1964)
- Sadko, Op. 5 (San Francisco Symphony Orchestra - 1945)
- March from Act 1 of Tsar Saltan (San Francisco Symphony Orchestra - 1945)

Gioachino Rossini

- L'Italiana in Algeri Overture (The Standard Symphony Orchestra (San Francisco) - Live 1952; BBC Northern Symphony Orchestra - Live 1962)
- Guillaume Tell Overture (The Standard Symphony Orchestra (San Francisco) - Live 1952)

Claude Rouget de Lisle

- La Marseillaise (London Symphony Orchestra - Studio rehearsal 1962)

Camille Saint-Saëns

- Havanaise (Leonid Kogan, Boston Symphony Orchestra - 1958)
- Concerto for Piano No. 4 in C minor, Op. 44 (Robert Casadesus, Royal Concertgebouw Orchestra - Live 1939)
- Violin Concerto No. 3 in B minor, Op. 61 (Michel Schwalbé, Berlin Philharmonic Orchestra - Live 1960)

Franz Schubert

- Symphony No. 8 in B minor, D. 759 'Unfinished' (Concertgebouw Orchestra - Live 1963)
- Symphony No. 9 in C major, D. 944, 'Great' (Boston Symphony Orchestra - Live Moscow 1956)
- Rosamunde: Overture, Ballet Music No. 2 and Entr'acte (Vienna Philharmonic Orchestra - 1957)
- Fantasie in C major, D760 'Wanderer' (Lili Kraus, The Standard Symphony Orchestra (San Francisco) - Live 1951)

Robert Schumann

- Symphony No. 4 in D minor, Op. 120 (The Standard Symphony Orchestra (San Francisco) - Live 1952; San Francisco Symphony Orchestra - 1952; BBC Symphony Orchestra - Live 1961)
- Manfred Overture, Op. 115 (Boston Symphony Orchestra - Live 1959)
- Introduction & Allegro appassionato in G major, Op. 92 (Rudolf Serkin, Boston Symphony Orchestra - Live 1959)

Alexander Scriabin

- Symphony No. 4 'Le Poème de l'extase', Op. 54 (San Francisco Symphony Orchestra - 1947; Boston Symphony Orchestra - 1952)

Jean Sibelius

- Symphony No. 2 (London Symphony Orchestra - 1958)
- Valse Triste, Op. 44, No. 1 (The Standard Symphony Orchestra (San Francisco) - Live 1949)
- Pohjola's Daughter, Op. 49 (The Standard Symphony Orchestra (San Francisco) - Live 1948)
- Violin Concerto (Jan Dahmen, Concertgebouw Orchestra - Live 1950)

John Philip Sousa

- The Stars and Stripes Forever (The Standard Symphony Orchestra (San Francisco) - Live 1948)

Richard Strauss

- Till Eulenspiegels lustige Streiche, Op. 28 (The Standard Symphony Orchestra (San Francisco) - Live 1952; Berlin Philharmonic Orchestra - Live 1960)
- Ein Heldenleben Op. 40, TrV. 190 (San Francisco Symphony Orchestra - 1947)
- Death and Transfiguration, Op. 24 (The Standard Symphony Orchestra (San Francisco) - Live 1952, Orchestre National de l’ORTF - Live 1956, Boston Symphony Orchestra - Live 1958, San Francisco Symphony Orchestra - 1960)
- Don Juan (The Standard Symphony Orchestra (San Francisco) - Live 1950; Boston Symphony Orchestra - Live 1959; BBC Northern Symphony Orchestra - Live 19630)
- Don Quixote, Op. 35 (Samuel Mayes - cello, Joseph de Pasquale - viola, Boston Symphony Orchestra - Live 1959)
- Der Rosenkavalier – Suite (The Standard Symphony Orchestra (San Francisco) - Live 1951)

Igor Stravinsky

- The Firebird, 1919 suite (Paris Conservatoire Orchestra - 1956)
- Petrushka - 1911 version (Orchestre National de l’ORTF - Live 1958/55; Julius Katchen, Paris Conservatoire Orchestra - 1956; Boston Symphony Orchestra - Live 1958; Boston Symphony Orchestra - 1959; Boston Symphony Orchestra - 1959 video; Berlin Philharmonic Orchestra - Live 1960)
- The Rite of Spring (Orchestre symphonique de Paris - 1929; San Francisco Symphony Orchestra - 1945; Boston Symphony Orchestra 1951; Orchestre National de l’ORTF - Live 1955; Paris Conservatoire Orchestra - 1956; London Symphony Orchestra - Live 1963)
- Symphony of Psalms (BBC Symphony Orchestra & Chorus - Live 1961)

Pyotr Ilyich Tchaikovsky

- Romeo & Juliet - Fantasy Overture (The Standard Symphony Orchestra (San Francisco) - Live 1950; London Symphony Orchestra - Live 1963; North German Radio Symphony Orchestra - 1964)
- Symphony No. 4 (Boston Symphony Orchestra - Live 1958; Boston Symphony Orchestra - Live 1959)
- Symphony No. 5 (Boston Symphony Orchestra - 1958; North German Radio Symphony Orchestra; Orchestre National de l’ORTF - Live 1958; Boston Symphony Orchestra - Live 1959; London Symphony Orchestra - Live 1963)
- Symphony No. 6 (Boston Symphony Orchestra - 1955)
- Sleeping Beauty, excerpts (London Symphony Orchestra - 1957)
- Swan Lake, excerpts (London Symphony Orchestra - 1962)
- Piano Concerto No. 1, Op. 23 (John Ogdon, London Symphony Orchestra - Live 1963)
- Variations on a Rococo Theme, Op. 35 (1877) (Erling Blöndal Bengtsson, Danish RSO - Live 1962)

Ambroise Thomas

- Overture to Mignon (The Standard Symphony Orchestra (San Francisco) - Live 1949)

Ralph Vaughan Williams

- A London Symphony (London Symphony Orchestra - Live 1962
- Fantasia on a Theme by Thomas Tallis (Boston Symphony Orchestra - Live 1963

Giuseppe Verdi

- La traviata (Rosanna Carteri, Cesare Valletti, Leonard Warren; Chorus and Orchestra del Teatro dell'Opera di Roma - 1956)

Richard Wagner

- Siegfried Idyll (San Francisco Symphony Orchestra - 1960; Royal Philharmonic Orchestra - 1960; Concertgebouw Orchestra - Live 1963)
- Der fliegende Holländer: Overture (The Standard Symphony Orchestra (San Francisco) - Live 1951; Orchestre National de l’ORTF - Live 1955; Boston Symphony Orchestra - Live 1958; North German Radio Symphony Orchestra - 1964)
- Der fliegende Holländer: "Johohoe! Traft ihr das Schiff im Meere an" ('Senta's Ballad') (Margaret Harshaw – soprano, Boston Symphony Orchestra - Live 1958)
- Tristan und Isolde: Prelude & Liebestod (The Standard Symphony Orchestra (San Francisco) - Live 1952; Boston Symphony Orchestra - Live 1959; Concertgebouw Orchestra - Live 1963; North German Radio Symphony Orchestra - 1964)
- Lohengrin: Prelude to Act 1 (Boston Symphony Orchestra - Live 1958)
- Lohengrin: "Einsam in trüben Tagen" (Margaret Harshaw – soprano, Boston Symphony Orchestra - Live 1958)
- Rienzi: Overture (The Standard Symphony Orchestra (San Francisco) - Live 1950; Boston Symphony Orchestra - Live 1958)
- Die Walküre: Ride of the Valkyries (Boston Symphony Orchestra - Live 1958)
- Die Walküre: 'Wotan's Farewell & Magic Fire Music' (The Standard Symphony Orchestra (San Francisco) - Live 1947)
- Siegfried: Waldweben (The Standard Symphony Orchestra (San Francisco) - Live 1947; Boston Symphony Orchestra - Live 1958)
- Götterdämmerung: Siegfried's Rhine Journey (The Standard Symphony Orchestra (San Francisco) - Live 1951; Concertgebouw Orchestra - Live 1963)
- Götterdämmerung: Funeral March and Immolation Scene (Birgit Nilsson, Concertgebouw Orchestra - Live 1963)
- Tannhäuser - Overture and Venusberg music (North German Radio Symphony Orchestra - 1964)
- Tannhäuser: Overture (The Standard Symphony Orchestra (San Francisco) - Live 1951; Concertgebouw Orchestra - Live 1963)
- Tannhäuser: "Dich, teure Halle" (Margaret Harshaw – soprano, Boston Symphony Orchestra - Live 1958)
- Die Meistersinger von Nürnberg: Overture, Dance of the Apprentices, Entry of the Masters (The Standard Symphony Orchestra (San Francisco) - Live 1950)
- Die Meistersinger von Nürnberg: Prelude to Act III (Chicago Symphony Orchestra - 1961 CD and video)
- Parsifal: Prelude to Act 1 (The Standard Symphony Orchestra (San Francisco) - Live 1950; Boston Symphony Orchestra - Live 1958)
- Parsifal: "Ich sah das Kind an seiner Mutter Brust" (Margaret Harshaw – soprano, Boston Symphony Orchestra - Live 1958)
- Parsifal: Good Friday music (The Standard Symphony Orchestra (San Francisco) - Live 1950)

William Walton

- Façade - Ballet Suite (Polka, Tango Pasodoble, Tarantella-Sevillana) (The Standard Symphony Orchestra (San Francisco) - Live 1950)

Carl Maria von Weber

- Euryanthe Overture (The Standard Symphony Orchestra (San Francisco) - Live 1950)
- Jubel Overture (London Symphony Orchestra; BBC Northern Symphony Orchestra - Live 1963)
- Konzertstück for Piano and Orchestra in F minor, Op. 79 (Lili Kraus, Concertgebouw Orchestra - Live 1939)
