= List of symphonic poems =

This is a list of some notable composers who wrote symphonic poems.

== Hugo Alfvén ==
- En skärgardssägen, Op. 20 (1903)

== Frederic Austin ==
- Isabella or the Pot of Basil (1909, after the poem by John Keats)

== Edgar Bainton ==
- Pompilia (1903)
- Paracelsus, Op. 8 (1904, after the poem by Robert Browning)
- Thalassa (1933, reworked into his Symphony No. 2 in D minor between 1939–40)

== Mily Balakirev ==
- Russia Second Overture on Russian Themes (1863–64, revised 1884)
- In Bohemia Overture on Czech Themes (1867, revised 1905)
- Tamara (1867–82)

== Béla Bartók ==
- Kossuth (1903)

== Arnold Bax ==
- Cathaleen-ni-Hoolihan (1905)
- Into the Twilight (1908)
- In the Faëry Hills (1909)
- Rosc-catha (1910)
- Christmas Eve (1912, r. 1921)
- Nympholept (1912, orch. 1915, r. 1935)
- The Garden of Fand (1913, orch. 1916)
- Spring Fire (1913)
- In Memoriam (1916)
- November Woods (1917)
- Tintagel (1917, orch. 1919)
- Summer Music (1917, orch. 1921, r. 1932)
- The Happy Forest (1922)
- The Tale the Pine Trees Knew (1931)
- Northern Ballad No. 1 (1927)
- Northern Ballad No. 2 (1934)
- Prelude for a Solemn Occasion (Northern Ballad No. 3) (1927, orch. 1933)
- A Legend (1944)

== Paul Ben-Haim ==
- Pan for soprano and orchestra, Op. 13 (1931)
- Yizkor (Evocation) for violin and orchestra (1942)

== Natanael Berg ==
- Traumgewalten (1910)
- Varde ljus! (1914)

== Hector Berlioz ==
- Chasse royale et orage from the Opera Les Troyens (1856–58)

== Franz Berwald ==
- Slaget vid Leipzig (The Battle of Leipzig, 1828)
- Elfenspiel (Play of the Elves, 1841)
- Ernste und heitere Grillen (Serious and Merry Whims, 1842)
- Erinnerung an die norwegischen Alpen (Reminiscence of the Norwegian Mountains, 1842)
- Bayaderen-Fest (Festival of the Bayadères, 1842)
- Wettlauf (Racing, 1842)

== Adolphe Biarent ==
- Trenmor (1905, after a legend from Ossian)

== Arthur H. Bird ==
- Eine Karneval-Szene, Op. 5 (A Carnival Scene, 1886)

== Ernest Bloch ==
- Vivre-aimer (1900)
- Hiver-printemps (1904–05)
- Voice in the Wilderness (1936)

== Mel Bonis ==
- Salomé, Op. 100 (1909, unpublished)
- Ophélie, Op. 165 (published in 2018)
- Le Rêve de Cléopâtre, Op. 180 (The dream of Cleopatra, published in 2018)

== Hjalmar Borgstrøm ==
- Hamlet, Op. 13 (1903)
- Jesus i Gethsemane, Op. 14 (Jesus in Gethsemane, 1904)
- John Gabriel Borkman, Op. 15 (1905)
- Die Nacht der Toten, Op. 16 (The Night of the Dead, 1905)
- Tanken, Op. 26 (The Idea, 1917)

== Alexander Borodin ==
- In the Steppes of Central Asia (actually 'Musical Picture'; 1880)

== Sergei Bortkiewicz ==
- Othello, Op. 19 (1914)

== Rutland Boughton ==
- A Summer Night (1899, rev 1903)
- Imperial Elegy: Into the Everlasting (1901)
- Troilus and Cressida (Thou and I) (1902)
- Love in Spring (1906)
- Midnight for Chorus & Orchestra (1907)

== Lili Boulanger ==
- D'un matin de printemps (A spring morning, 1918)
- D'un soir triste (A sad evening, 1918)

== York Bowen ==
- The Lament of Tasso, Op.5 (1902)
- Symphonic Fantasia, Op.16 (1905)

== Henry Brant ==
- Curriculum ll: Spatial Tone Poem

== Havergal Brian ==
- Hero and Leander Op. 8 (1904–06, lost)
- Humorous Legend on Three Blind Mice (1908–09, withdrawn)
- In Memoriam (1910)
- Doctor Merryheart Comedy Overture No. 1 (1911-2)
- The Battle Song (sketched between 1930 and 1931, completed by John Pickard in 1997)
- Elegy (1954)

== Frank Bridge ==
- Mid of the Night (1903)
- Isabella (1907, after John Keats)
- Summer (1914–15)
- Enter Spring (1926–27)

== Hans Bronsart von Schellendorff ==
- Manfred (c.1901)

== Alfred Bruneau ==
- La belle au bois dormant (The sleeping beauty, 1894)

== Ferrucio Busoni ==
- Symphonisches Tongedicht, Op. 31a (1893)

== Alfredo Casella ==
- Pagine di Guerra for four-hand piano (1915, revised and orchestrated in 1918)
- A Notte Alta, Op. 30 for solo piano (1917, arranged for piano and orchestra in 1921)

== George Whitefield Chadwick ==
- Symphonic Sketches (1895-1904)
- Cleopatra (1904)
- Aphrodite Symphonic Fantasy (1910–11)
- Tam o' Shanter, Symphonic Ballad (1914–15)
- Angel of Death (1917–18)

== Ernest Chausson ==
- Viviane (1882, rev 1887)

== Frederic Cliffe ==
- Cloud and Sunshine (1890)

== James Cohn ==
- A Song of the Waters, Op. 53 (1976)

== Claude Debussy ==
- Prélude à l'après-midi d'un faune (Prelude to the Afternoon of a Faun, 1891–94)
- La Mer (The Sea, 1903–05, rev 1908)

== Frederick Delius ==
- Hiawatha (1887-8, completed by Robert Threlfall)
- Three Small Tone-poems, VI/7 (1890)
1. Summer Evening
2. Winter Night (or, Sleigh Ride)
3. Spring Morning
- Paa Vidderne (On the Mountains), VI/10 (1890–92)
- Over the Hills and Far Away, VI/11 (1895–97); fantasy overture for orchestra
- Paris: The Song of a Great City, VI/14 (1899-1900); nocturne for orchestra
- Two Pieces for Small Orchestra, VI/19 (1911–12)
1. On Hearing the First Cuckoo in Spring
2. Summer Night on the River
- Eventyr (Once Upon a Time), VI/23 (1917)
- A Song of Summer, VI/26 (1929–30)

== Felix Draeseke ==
- Julius Caesar (1860, rev 1865)
- Frithjof (1865)
- Der Thunersee (1903)

== Paul Dukas ==
- L'apprenti sorcier (The Sorcerer's Apprentice), symphonic scherzo after Goethe (1896–97)
- Le fil de parque (c.1908, projected or destroyed)

== Henri Duparc ==
- Aux étoiles (only extant movement from the Poème nocturne, 1874)
- Lénore (1875)

== Antonín Dvořák ==
- Rhapsody in A minor, Op. 14 (1874)
- Vodník (The Water Goblin), Op. 107 (1896)
- Polednice (The Noon Witch), Op. 108 (1896)
- Zlatý kolovrat (The Golden Spinning Wheel), Op. 109 (1896)
- Holoubek (The Wild Dove), Op. 110 (1896; r. 1897)
- Píseň bohatýrská (A Hero's Song), Op. 111 (1897)

== George Dyson ==
- Siena (1907, lost)

== Edward Elgar ==
- Cockaigne (In London Town) (1900–01)
- In the South (Alassio) (1903–04)
- Falstaff Symphonic Study in C minor, Op. 68 (1913)

== Ben Emberley ==
- Elagabalus, Op.19 (2026)

== George Enescu ==
- Isis (unfinished, 1923; completed by Pascal Bentoiu)
- Vox maris, Op. 31 (1929–54)

== Óscar Esplá ==
- El sueño de Eros (The dream of Eros, 1912)
- Don Quijote velando las armas (Don Quixote guarding the weapons, 1924)

== Harry Farjeon ==
- Mowgli (1907)
- Summer Vision (1913, lost)
- Pannychis (1942)

== Lorenzo Ferrero ==
- La Nueva España, a set of six symphonic poems (1992–99)

== Zdeněk Fibich ==
- Othello, Op. 6 (1873)
- Spring, Op 13 (1881)
- Záboj, Slavoj a Luděk, Op. 37 (1873)
- The Tempest, Op. 46 (1880)
- Toman and the Wood Nymph, Op. 49 (1874–75)

== Josef Bohuslav Foerster ==
- Mé Mládí, Op. 44 (My Youth, 1900)
- Jaro a touha, Op. 93 (Springtime and Desire, 1912)

== César Franck ==
- Ce qu'on entend sur la montagne, symphonic poem after Victor Hugo, (1846)
- Rédemption, for soprano, chorus and orchestra, M. 52 (1872, r. 1874)
- Les Éolides, M. 43 (1875–76)
- Le Chasseur maudit (The Accursed Huntsman), M. 44 (1881–82)
- Les Djinns, for piano and orchestra, M. 45 (1884)
- Psyché, for orchestra and chorus, M. 47 (1886–88)

== Arthur Friedheim ==
- Transitions (unknown date)

== Edward German ==
- Hamlet (1897)
- The Willow Song (a.k.a. "Othello", 1922)

== George Gershwin ==
- An American in Paris (1928, actually 'Tone Poem')
- Cuban Overture (1932, conceived as a symphonic poem)

== Ruth Gipps ==
- Knight in Armour, Op. 8 (1942)
- Death on a Pale Horse, Op. 25 (1943)

== Alexander Glazunov ==
- Stenka Razin, Op. 13 (1885)

== Reinhold Glière ==
- The Sirens, Op. 33 (1908)
- The Zaporozhy Cossacks, Op. 64 (1921)
- The Bequest, Op. 73 (1941)

== Karl Goldmark ==
- Zrínyi, Op. 47 (1903)

== Geoffrey Gordon ==
- Shock Diamonds (1968)

== Eugene Aynsley Goossens ==
- Perseus, Op. 3 (1912)
- The Eternal Rhythm, Op. 5 (1913)

== Percy Grainger ==
- Train Music (1901–57)

== Čestmír Gregor ==
- Čekání (Waiting, 1942)
- Děti Daidalovy (Daedalus' Children, 1961)

== Ferde Grofé ==
- Knute Rockne (1931)
- Rip Van Winkle (1932-1954, reworked into "Hudson River Suite")
- Trylon and Perisphere (1939, later renamed as "Black Gold")
- Atlantic Crossing (1965)

== Ernest Guiraud ==
- Chasse fantastique (1887)

== Henry Kimball Hadley ==
- Salome, Op. 55 (1905)
- Lucifer, Op. 66 (1914)
- Othello, Op. 96 (1919)
- The Ocean, Op. 99 (1921)

== Howard Hanson ==
- Before the Dawn (1920)
- Exaltation, Op. 20 (1920)
- North and West (1923)
- Lux aeterna, Op. 24 (1923–26)
- Pan and the Priest, Op. 26 (1926)

== Karl Amadeus Hartmann ==
- Miserae (1933–34, previously titled Symphony No. 1)

== Hamilton Harty ==
- With the Wild Geese (1910)
- The Children of Lir (1938)

== Alfred Hill ==
- The Lost Hunter (1945)

== Joseph Holbrooke ==
- The Raven, Op. 25 (1899-1900, rev 1903)
- Ode to Victory. Op. 29 (1901, destroyed)
- The Viking, Op. 32 (1901, rev 1912)
- Ulalume, Op. 35 (1903)
- The Birds of Rhiannon, Op. 87 (c.1922)

== Lee Holdridge ==
- Scenes of Summer (1973)

== Augusta Holmès ==
- Hymne à Apollon (Hymn to Apollo, 1872)
- Les Argonautes (The Argonauts, 1880)
- Irlande (Ireland, 1882)
- Andromède (Andromeda, 1883)
- Pologne (Poland, 1883)
- La Nuit et l'Amour ("Night and love" interlude from the ode "Ludus pro Patria", 1888)

== Gustav Holst ==
- Indra, Op 13 (1903)
- Egdon Heath, Op. 47 (1927)

== Arthur Honegger ==
- Pastorale d'été (1920)
- Pacific 231 Symphonic Movement No. 1 (1924)
- Rugby Symphonic Movement No. 2 (1928)
- Radio-panoramique (1935)

== Alan Hovhaness ==
- Copernicus, Op. 338 (1960)
- Komachi 7 miniature tone poems for piano, Op. 240 (1971)

== Airat Ichmouratov ==
- David of Sassoun, symphonic poem after Armenian epos, Op. 11 (2006)
- The Letter from an Unknown Woman, for Strings, Op. 56 (2017)

== Vincent d'Indy ==
- La Divine Comédie (The Divine Comedy after Dante, 1871)
- Poème des montagnes for piano, Op. 15 (Poem of the Mountains, 1881)
- Istar, Op. 42 (1896)

== John Ireland ==
- The Forgotten Rite (1913)
- Mai-Dun (1921)

== Mikhail Ippolitov-Ivanov ==
- On the Volga, Op. 50 (1910)

== Jānis Ivanovs ==
- Varavīksne (Rainbow, 1939)
- Lāčplēsis (Lacplesis, 1957)
- Poema Luttuoso for string orchestra (1966)
- Novella Brevis (1982)

== Charles Ives ==
- Central Park in the Dark (1906, rev 1936)
- The Unanswered Question (1908, rev 1930–35)
- The General Slocum (Sketched 1909–10, three completions made, most notably the one by D.G. Porter)

== Zhu Jian'er ==
- Ode to the Motherland, Op. 13 (1959)
- Wonders of Naxi, Op. 25 (1984)
- Mountain Soul, Op. 39 (1995)
- A Hundred Years of Vicissitudes, Op. 41 (1996)

== Dmitry Kabalevsky ==
- Spring, Op. 65 (1960)
- The Eternal Flame in Bryansk, Op. 85 (1968?)

== Manolis Kalomiris ==
- Minas, the Rebel Corsair of the Aegean (1940)
- The Death of the Valiant Woman (1943, rev 1944–45)

== Artur Kapp ==
- Saatus (Fate, 1925)

== Sigfrid Karg-Elert ==
- Prinz Karneval (1908)

== Mieczysław Karłowicz ==
- Returning Waves, Op. 9 (1904)
- Eternal Songs, Op. 10 (1906)
- Lithuanian Rhapsody, Op. 11 (1906)
- Stanisław i Anna Oświecimowie, Op. 12 (1906)
- A Sorrowful Tale, Op. 13 (1907–08)
- An Episode during Masquerade, Op. 14 (1908–09)

== Hugo Kaun ==
- Vineta, Op. 16 (1886)
- Im Urwald, Op.43 (1901, based on Longfellow's Song of Hiawatha)
- Sir John Falstaff, Op. 60 (1904)

== Paul von Klenau ==
- Paolo und Francesca (1913)
- Jahrmarkt bei London (1922)

== Lev Knipper ==
- On the Mountain Pass (1940)
- Tales about the New Land (1958–60)
- Letters to a Girl Friend (1961)

== Victor Kolar ==
- Hiawatha (circa 1908)
- A Fairy Tale (circa 1913)

== Erich Wolfgang Korngold ==
- Tomorrow for mezzo-soprano, women's choir and orchestra, Op. 31 (1944, from the movie The Constant Nymph)

== László Lajtha ==
- In Memoriam, Op. 35 (1941)

== Artur Lemba ==
- Symphonic Poem (1957, dedicated to the 40 anniversary of the October Revolution)

== Franz Liszt ==
- Liszt's symphonic poems:
  - Ce qu'on entend sur la montagne (1848-9) (after Victor Hugo)
  - Tasso: lamento e trionfo (1849) (after Byron)
  - Les Préludes, after Lamartine (1848, rev. before 1854)
  - Orpheus (1853-4)
  - Prometheus (1850)
  - Mazeppa (1851)
  - Festklänge (1853)
  - Héroïde funèbre (1849–50)
  - Hungaria (1854)
  - Hamlet (1858)
  - Hunnenschlacht (1857)
  - Die Ideale (1857) (after Schiller)
  - Von der Wiege bis zum Grabe (1881-2)

== William Lloyd Webber ==
- Aurora (1948)

== Sergei Lyapunov ==
- Zelazowa Wola, Op. 37 (1909)
- Hashish, Op. 53 (1914)

== Borys Lyatoshynsky ==
- Возз’єднання, Op. 49 (Reunification, 1949–50)
- Grazyna, Op 58 (1955)
- На берегах Вислы, Op. 59 (On the Banks of the Vistula, 1958)
- Lyric poem "To the Memory of Gliere", Op. 66 (1964)

== Edward MacDowell ==
- Hamlet and Ophelia, Op. 22 (1884)
- Lancelot and Elaine, Op.25 (1886)
- Lamia, Op. 29 (1888)
- Die Sarazenen & Die schöne Aldâ, Op.30 (1886–90)

== Leevi Madetoja ==
- Kullervo, Op. 15 (1913)
- Sammon ryöstö (The Abduction of The Sampo), for baritone and male choir, Op. 24 (1915); text from the Kalevala
- Aslak Smaukka, for baritone and male choir, Op. 37 (1917)
- Väinämöisen kylvö (Väinämöinen Sows the Wilderness), for soprano (or tenor), Op. 46 (1919–20); text from the Kalevala

== Frederik Magle ==
- Cantabile suite (2004–09)

== Miguel Marqués ==
- La Cova del Drach (The Cave of Drach, 1904)
- En la Alhambra (In Alhambra, circa 1905)
- La Vida (Life, 1906)
- Oceánica (Oceanic, unknown date)

== Bohuslav Martinů ==
- Angel of Death H 17 (1910)
- Vanishing Midnight Cycle of symphonic poems H 131 (1922)

== John Blackwood McEwen ==
- Comala (1889)

== Erkki Melartin ==
- Siikajoki, Op. 28 (1903–04)
- Traumgesicht, Op. 70 (1910)
- Patria, Op. 72 (1911)

== Aarre Merikanto ==
- Lemminkäinen (1916)
- Pan (1924)
- Notturno (1928)
- The Abduction of Kyllikki (1936)

== Olivier Messiaen ==
- Jesus (1928, lost)

== Richard Mohaupt ==
- Town Piper Music (Stadtpfeifermusik, 1941)

== Douglas Moore ==
- Moby Dick (1928)
- In Memoriam (1943)

== Vano Muradeli ==
- The Path of Victory (1950)

== Modest Mussorgsky ==
- Night on the Bare Mountain (1867, reworked into multiple versions)
- Pictures at an Exhibition (1874, orchestrated by Maurice Ravel in 1922)

== Nikolai Myaskovsky ==
- Silence, after the fable by Edgar Allan Poe, Op. 9 (1909–10)
- Alastor, After the poem by Shelley, Op. 14 (1912)

== Carl Nielsen ==
- Saga-Drøm (Saga Dream), Op. 39 (1908)
- Pan og Syrinx (Pan and Syrinx), Op. 49 (1918)
- En Fantasirejse til Færøerne (An Imaginary Trip to the Faroe Islands, 1927)

== Ludolf Nielsen ==
- Regnar Lodbrog, Op. 2 (1900–01)
- Sommernatsstemning! (1903, lost, only an arrangement for 4-hand-piano remains)
- In Memoriam (1904)
- Babelstaarnet, Op.35 (Tower of Babel, 1912–14)
- Hjortholm (1923)

== Zygmunt Noskowski ==
- Step, Op. 66 (The Steppe, 1895)

== Vítězslav Novák ==
- V Tatrách, Op. 26 (In the Tatra mountains, 1902)
- O večné touze, Op. 33 (Eternal Longing, 1903–05), after Hans Christian Andersen
- Toman a lesní panna, Op. 40 (Toman and the Wood Nymph, 1906–07)
- Pan for solo piano, Op. 43 (1910)
- De Profundis, Op. 67 (1941)

== Feliks Nowowiejski ==
- Three Symphonic Poems, Op. 17
  - 1. Beatrice (1903)
  - 2. Nina and Pergolesi (1905)
  - 3. The Death of Helena (1915)

== Ole Olsen ==
- Asgaardsreien, Op. 10 (1878, rev before 1910)
- Alfedans, Op. 14 (ca.1880)

== Otakar Ostrčil ==
- Pohádka o Šemíku, Op. 3 (Tale of Šemík, 1899)
- Léto, Op. 23 (Summer, 1927)

== John Knowles Paine ==
- The Tempest, Op. 31 (ca.1876, after Shakespeare)
- Poseidon and Amphitrite, Op. 44 (ca.1888)
- Lincoln (ca.1904-06, incomplete)

== Hubert Parry ==
- From Death to Life (1914, retitled as "Symphonic Poem in 2 connected movements")

== Florence Price ==
- Ethiopia's Shadow in America (1929–32)
- Songs of the Oak (1943)

== Henri Rabaud ==
- Procession nocturne, Op. 6 (after Nicolas Lenau, 1899)

== Sergei Rachmaninoff ==
- Manfred (1890-01, lost)
- Prince Rostislav (1891)
- The Rock, Op. 7 (1893)
- Isle of the Dead, Op. 29 (1908)

== Joachim Raff ==
- Volker for violin and piano, Op. 203 (1876)

== Osmo Tapio Räihälä ==
- Ardbeg (2003)
- Barlinnie Nine (2005)
- Rautasade (Iron Rain) (2008)

== Ture Rangström ==
- Dithyramb (1909, revised by Kurt Atterberg in 1948)
- Ett Midsommarstycke (A Midsummer Piece, 1910)
- En Höstsång (An Autumn Song, 1911)
- Havet Sjunger (Song of the Sea, 1913)

== Max Reger ==
- Vier Tondichtungen nach A. Böcklin (Four Tone Poems after Arnold Böcklin) for orchestra, Op. 128 (1913)

== Cemal Reşit Rey ==
- Bebek Efsanesi, symphonic poem for orchestra
- Karagöz
- Denizciler Marşı Başlayış
- Çağrılış
- Fatih
- Türkiye (1971)
- Ellinci Yıla Giriş

== Ottorino Respighi ==
- Fontane di Roma (Fountains of Rome), P 106 (1916); part I of Respighi's Roman Trilogy
- Ballata delle gnomidi (Ballad of the Gnomes), P 124 (1919)
- Pini di Roma (Pines of Rome), P 141 (1924); part II of Respighi's Roman Trilogy
- Feste Romane (Roman Festivals), P 157 (1928); part III of Respighi's Roman Trilogy

== Silvestre Revueltas ==
- Cuauhnáhuac (1931, rev 1931–32)
- Esquinas (1931, rev 1933)
- Janitzio (1933, rev 1936)
- Sensemayá (1937, rev 1938)

== Josef Gabriel Rheinberger ==
- Wallenstein, Op. 10 (1866–68, also his Symphony No. 1)

== Nikolai Rimsky-Korsakov ==
- Sadko Musical picture, Op.5 (1867, rev 1869 and 1892)
- Antar Op. 9 (1868, rev 1875 and 1891)
- Scheherazade Symphonic Suite, Op. 35 (1888)
- Flight of the Bumblebee Orchestral interlude from the opera The Tale of Tsar Saltan (1899-1900)
- Night on Mount Triglav from the opera Mlada (1899-1901)

== Albert Roussel ==
- La Menace, Op. 9 (1908)
- Evocations, Op. 15 (1910–11)
- Elpénor, Op. 59 (1937)

== Anton Rubinstein ==
- Faust, Op. 68 (1864)
- Ivan the Terrible, Op. 79 (1869)
- Don Quixote, Op. 87 (1870)

== Joseph Ryelandt ==
- La Noche Oscura, Op. 25 (The Dark Night, 1899)
- Idylle mystique, Op. 30 (1900–01)
- Gethsemani, Op 42 (1908)

== Camille Saint-Saëns ==
- Spartacus (1863)
- Le Rouet d'Omphale, Op. 31 (1869)
- Phaéton, Op. 39 (1873)
- Danse macabre, Op. 40 (1874)
- La Jeunesse d'Hercule, Op. 50 (1877)
- La Muse et le Poète, Op. 132 (1910)

== Vadim Salmanov ==
- Forest (1948)

== Giacinto Scelsi ==
- Rotative for three pianos, winds and percussion (1929)

== Philipp Scharwenka ==
- Herbstfeier, Op. 44

== Ernest Schelling ==
- Légende Symphonique (1907)
- Morocco (1927)

== Arnold Schoenberg ==
- Frühlings Tod (Fragment, 1898)
- Verklärte Nacht, Op.4 (1899)
- Pelleas und Melisande, Op.5 (1902–03)

== Georg Schumann ==
- Im Ringen um ein Ideal, Op. 66 (1916)

== Cyril Scott ==
- Disaster at Sea (1933, rev 1935 as "Neptune")

== Alexander Scriabin ==
- The Poem of Ecstasy, Op. 54 (1905–08); often listed as Symphony No. 4
- Prometheus: The Poem of Fire, Op. 60 (1910); often listed as Symphony No. 5

== Johanna Senfter ==
- Tonstück, Op. 102
- Folge von heiteren stücke, Op. 130

== Dmitri Shostakovich ==
- From Karl Marx to Our Own Days for solo voices, chorus and orchestra (1932)
- The Execution of Stepan Razin, Op. 119 (1964)
- October, Op. 131 (1967)

== Jean Sibelius ==
One of the most prolific (and significant) contributors to the genre; compositions marked with an asterisk were inspired by Finnish mythology:

- Kullervo, Op. 7 (1891–1892, withdrawn 1893) * [considered variously as a choral symphony and as a cycle of five tone poems]
- En saga, Op. 9 (1892, revised 1902)
- Spring Song, Op. 16 (1894, revised 1895)
- The Wood Nymph (The Wood Nymph), Op. 15 (1894–1895)
- Lemminkäinen Suite (also known as Four Legends from the Kalevala), Op. 22 * [a cycle of four tone poems]
1. Lemminkäinen and the Maidens of the Island (1895, revised 1897 and 1939) *
2. The Swan of Tuonela (1893-1895, revised 1897 and 1900) *
3. Lemminkäinen in Tuonela (1895, revised 1897 and 1939) *
4. Lemminkäinen's Return (1895, revised 1897 and 1900) *
- Finlandia, Op. 26 (1899, revised 1900); arranged from Press Celebrations Music, JS 137
- Pohjola's Daughter, Op. 49 (1906) *
- Nightride and Sunrise, Op. 55 (1909)
- The Dryad, Op. 45/1 (1910)
- Luonnotar, for soprano and orchestra, Op. 70 (1913); text from the Kalevala *
- The Bard, Op. 64 (1913, revised 1913)
- The Oceanides, Op. 73 (1913–1914, revised 1914)
- Tapiola, Op. 112 (1926) *

== Bedřich Smetana ==
- Richard III, Op. 11/JB 1:70 (1857–58)
- Valdštýnův tábor (Wallenstein's Camp), Op. 14/JB 1:72 (1858–59)
- Hakon Jarl, Op. 16/JB 1:79 (1860–61)
- Má vlast (My Homeland), JB 1:112 (1874–79); a cycle of six symphonic poems
1. Vyšehrad (The High Castle)
2. Vltava (The Moldau)
3. Šárka
4. Z českých luhů a hájů (From Bohemia's Woods and Fields)
5. Tábor
6. Blaník

== David Stanley Smith ==
- Darkness and Dawn, Op. 5 (1901)
- The Djinns (1911)
- The Golden Age, Op.40 (Cycle of five symphonic poems, 1916)
- Vision of Isaiah, Op. 58 (1927)
- Credo, Op. 85 (1941)
- Triumph and peace for solo organ, Op. 88 (1942)
- The Apostle, Op. 92 (1944)

== Charlotte Sohy ==
- Danse mystique, Op. 19 (Mystic dance, 1922)

== William Grant Still ==
- Darker America (1924)
- Africa (1924–30)
- Dismal Swamp (1933–36)
- Kaintuck (1935)
- Poem for Orchestra (1944)

== Richard Strauss ==
One of the most prolific (and important) contributors to the genre. He preferred the term "tone poem," rather than "symphonic poem."

- Aus Italien (From Italy), Op. 16 (1886)
- Don Juan, Op. 20 (1888)
- Macbeth, Op. 23 (1886–88)
- Tod und Verklärung (Death and Transfiguration), Op. 24 (1889)
- Till Eulenspiegels lustige Streiche (Till Eulenspiegel's Merry Pranks), Op. 28 (1894–95)
- Also sprach Zarathustra (Thus Spoke Zarathustra), Op. 30 (1896)
- Don Quixote, Op. 35 (1897)
- Ein Heldenleben (A Hero's Life), Op. 40 (1898)
- Symphonia Domestica, Op. 53 (1903)
- Eine Alpensinfonie (An Alpine Symphony), Op. 64 (1915)

== Igor Stravinsky ==
- Le chant du rossignol (Song of the Nightingale, 1917)

== George Templeton Strong ==
- Dance of the Dead, Op.11 (1878)
- Darkness, Op.13 (1879)
- Spring (ca.1879, lost)
- Undine, Op. 14 (1882–83)
- On the Ocean (1892, lost)
- The Night (four symphonic poems, 1913)
- To the Fields (1913, rev 1937)
- Le Roi Arthur (King Arthur, 1890–91, rev 1915-6)
- Une Vie d'Artiste (An Artist's life, 1919)
- The Voyage (The Journey, 1929)

== Josef Suk ==
- Praga, Op. 26 (1904)
- Pohádka Léta, Op. 29 (A Summer's Tale, 1908–09)
- Ripening, Op. 34 (1912–17)
- Cycle of Symphonic Poems from Czech History (1915–17)

== Heikki Suolahti ==
- Hades, Op. 10 (1932)

== Evgeny Svetlanov ==
- Daybreak in the Field (Symphonic Picture, 1949)
- Daugava (1952)
- Azov Mountain, Op.10
- The Red Guelder-Rose

== Sergei Taneyev ==
- Oresteia (labeled as an "overture", but really a symphonic poem based on themes from his opera of the same name)

== Karl Tausig ==
- Manfred, after Byron (c1862-63, lost)
- Der Triumph der Liebe (c1862-63, only 1 page survives)

== Pyotr Ilyich Tchaikovsky ==
- The Storm, Op. (posth.) 76 (1864)
- Fatum, Op. 77 (1868)
- Romeo and Juliet, overture-fantasy after Shakespeare, TH 42 (1869–70, r. 1880)
- Francesca da Rimini, symphonic fantasia after Dante, Op. 32 (1876)
- The Tempest, symphonic fantasia after Shakespeare, Op. 18 (1873)
- Marche slave, Op. 31 (1876)
- Hamlet, overture-fantasy, Op. 67a (1889)
- The Voyevoda, Op. (posth.) 78 (1891)

== Geirr Tveitt ==
- Nykken (1957)

== Galina Ustvolskaya ==
- The Dream of Stepan Razin (1949)
- The Hero's Exploit (1957, later renamed as "Poem No. 2")
- Lights in the Steppe (1958, later renamed as "Poem No. 1")
- Poem on Peace (1962)

== Edgard Varèse ==
- Apothéoses de l'océan (circa 1905, lost)
- Bourgogne (circa 1908, lost)
- Gargantua (lost)

== Louis Vierne ==
- Les djinns, Op. 35 for soprano and orchestra (1912)
- Psyché, Op. 33 for soprano and orchestra (1914)
- Éros, Op. 37 for soprano and orchestra (1916)

== Johan Wagenaar ==
- Saul en David, Op. 24 (1906)
- Elverhoï, Op. 48 (1940)

== Richard Wagner ==
- Siegfried Idyll (1869–70)

== Anton Webern ==
- Im Sommerwind (actually 'Idyll after B. Wille', 1904)

== Mieczysław Weinberg ==
- Symphonic Poem, Op. 6 (1941)
- Morning-Red, Op. 60 (1957)
- The Banners of Peace, Op. 143 (1986)

== Felix Weingartner ==
- König Lear, Op. 20 (King Lear, 1895)
- Das Gefilde der Seligen, Op. 21 (Fields of the Blessed, 1892)
- La Burla, Op. 78 (a.k.a The Tempest)
- Frühling, Op. 80

== Eric Whitacre ==
- Godzilla Eats Las Vegas (for winds, 1996)

== Charles-Marie Widor ==
- La Nuit de Walpurgis, Op. 60 (1887)

== Ralph Vaughan Williams ==
- In the Fen Country (1904, rev 1905 and 1907)

== Sergei Vasilenko ==
- Three Bloody Battles (1899-1900, after Tolstoy)
- The Garden of Death, Op. 12 (1907–08, based on Wilde's The Canterville Ghost
- Sappho, Op.14 (1909)
- Hyrcus Nocturnus, Op 15 (1908–09, Flight of the Witches)
- Au soleil, Op 17 (In the Rays of the Sun, 1910–11)

== José Vianna da Motta ==
- Inês de Castro ("Overture", 1886)
- Invocação dos Lusíadas, Op. 19 (1897)

== Adolf Wiklund ==
- Summer Night and Sunrise, Op. 19 (1918)

== Hugo Wolf ==
- Penthesilea (1883–85)

== Haydn Wood ==
- Mannin Veen: Dear Isle of Man (1933)

== Alexander von Zemlinsky ==
- Die Seejungfrau (The Little Mermaid), fantasy after Hans Christian Andersen (1902–03)

== Kōsaku Yamada ==
- The Dark Gate (1913, inspired by a poem by Rofu Miki)
- Flower of Mandala (1913, inspired by a poem by Kazo Saito)

== See also ==
- List of program music
