= Christopher Moore =

Christopher or Chris Moore may refer to:

== Arts and entertainment ==
=== Literature ===
- Christopher Moore (Canadian historian) (born 1950), Canadian author and journalist
- Christopher G. Moore, Canadian novelist
- Christopher Moore (author) (born 1957), American comic fantasy author

=== Music ===
- Christopher Moore (choir founder) (fl. 1950s), American founder of the Chicago Children's Choir
- Christopher Moore (DJ) (1941–2021), British/American disc jockey and radio broadcaster for Radio Carolina
- Chris Moore (producer/audio engineer) (born 1973), American record producer/audio engineer
- Christopher Moore (rapper) (a.k.a. Lil Twist, born 1993), American rap recording artist
- Christopher Moore (Australian musician), Australian viola player
- Chris Moore, an Irish musician who had a hit single in Ireland in 1993

=== Visual arts ===
- Christopher Moore (sculptor) (1790–1863), Irish-born sculptor
- Chris Moore (illustrator) (1947–2025), English science fiction illustrator
- Chris Moore (film producer), American film producer

== Sports ==
- Chris Moore (footballer, born 1980), Welsh footballer
- Chris Masters (a.k.a. Chris Moore, born 1983), American professional wrestler
- Chris Moore (footballer, born 1984), English footballer
- Chris Moore (American football) (born 1993), American football wide receiver

== Others ==
- Christopher Moore (preservationist) (1952–2022), American curator and historian
- Chris Moore (businessman) (fl. 2008–2011), English business executive, CEO of Domino's Pizza UK & IRL
- Christopher I. Moore, American neuroscientist at Brown University

== See also ==
- Christopher More (c. 1480–1549), English politician
