= Winds of Nagual =

1985 composition by Michael Colgrass

Winds of Nagual: A Musical Fable for Wind Ensemble on the Writings of Carlos Castaneda is a 1985 composition for wind ensemble by Canadian composer Michael Colgrass. It has become a standard of the wind ensemble/concert band repertoire. Based on the writings of Carlos Castaneda, the work consists of seven movements.

In 1985, the piece won the William D. Revelli Composition Contest and the Sudler International Composition Competition.

== Structure ==
There are seven movements:

1. The Desert: Don Juan Emerges from the Mountains
2. Don Genaro Appears
3. Carlos Stares at the River and Becomes a Bubble
4. The Gait of Power
5. Asking Twilight for Calmness and Power
6. Don Juan Clowns for Carlos
7. Last Conversation and Farewell

== Recordings ==
- Northwestern University Symphonic Wind Ensemble, Mallory Thompson (2002). Winds of Nagual (CD). Summit Records. 313.
- Ohio State University Wind Symphony, Russel C. Mikkelson (2007). Winds of Nagual (CD). Naxos. 8570244.

== See also ==
- List of concert band literature
- List of program music
- Program music
