= Africa (Still) =

1930 symphonic poem by William Grant Still

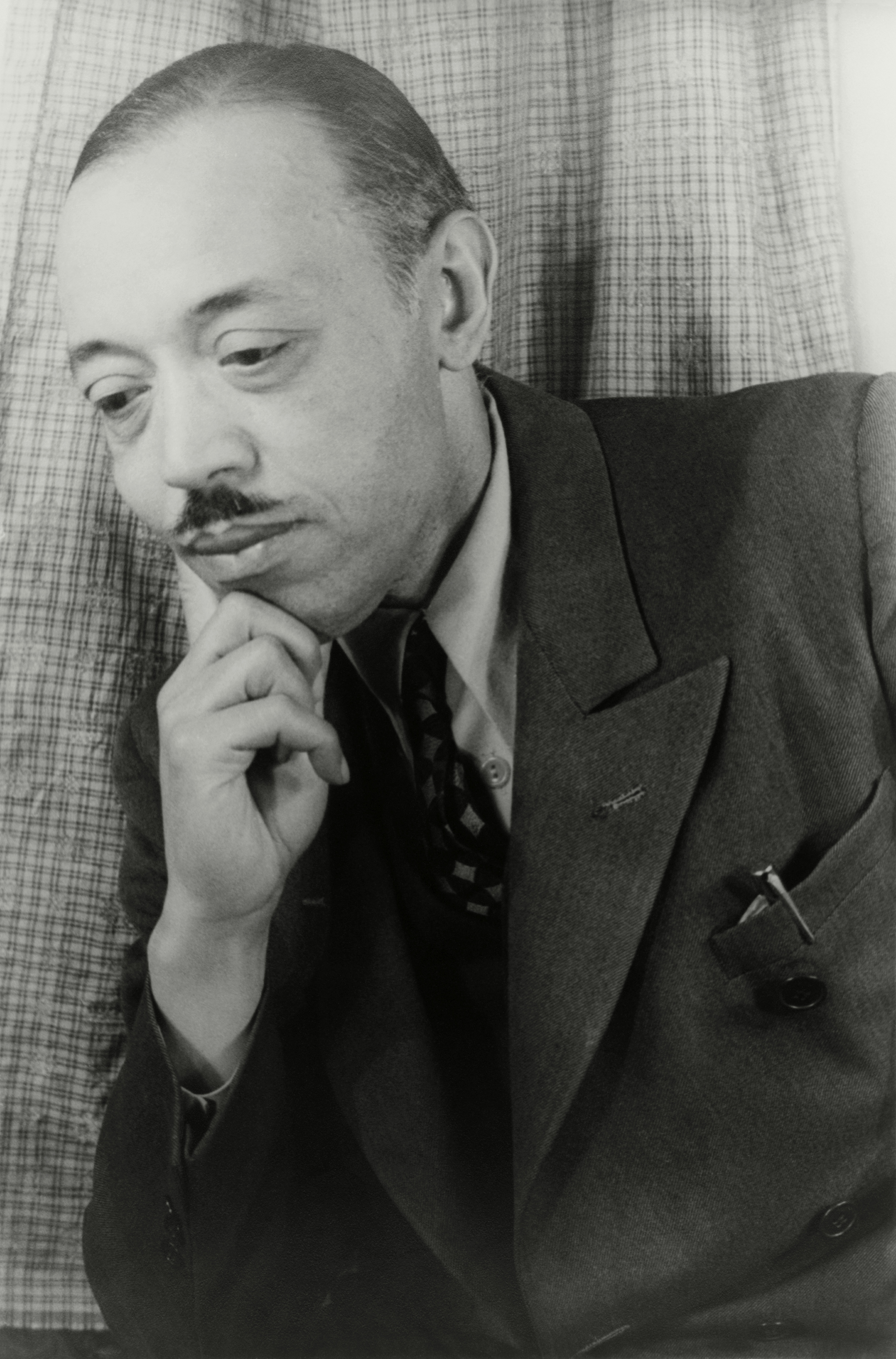
William Grant Still in 1949, photographed by Carl Van Vechten

Africa is a 1930 symphonic poem in three movements by American composer William Grant Still. The work, originally scored for chamber orchestra, was first performed in 1930 by French flautist Georges Barrère and, in a full orchestra version, by Howard Hanson on October 24, 1930, at the Eastman School of Music in Rochester, New York. The work is about twenty-eight minutes long.

== Overview ==
A description of the symphonic poem is as follows:

[The work is] designed as an American Negro's wholly fanciful concept of the cradle of his Race, formed on the folklore of generations. The three movements of Africa are titled: "Land of Peace," "Land of Romance," "Land of Superstition." ... In the first movement, two kinds of peace are portrayed, the first pastoral, the second spiritual. It is an active peace and quietude, not a lethargic slumber. "Land of Romance" is tinged with sadness, intensified by the orchestral treatment of the first part of the movement. It ends on a note of passionate longing. In the final movement, two forms of superstition appear: that of the pagan African and that of the followers of Mohammed. The music abounds in the suggestion of startling unspoken fears, lurking terrors. It subtly conveys the idea that the race has not yet shaken off primitive beliefs, despite the influence of civilization. The opening theme later proceeds into a rather Oriental motif, by which the composer intended to depict the arid Northern part of Africa. Africa places the listener instantly on the soil of the Dark Continent; it is not merely a picture of abstract beauty.

— Catherine Parson Smith, University of California Press

== Movements ==
The symphonic poem is in three movements as follows:

1. Land of Peace
2. Land of Romance
3. Land of Superstition

== Reviews ==
Reviewers, commenting on its premiere performance, noted that the composition was "not as inchoate or as desultory as his Darker America and Journal of a Wanderer," and, according to biographer Catherine Parson Smith, "[the work] quickly became one of his most highly praised compositions".

== See also ==
- List of jazz-influenced classical compositions
- List of symphonic poems
