= Harlem Air Shaft =

Composition by Duke Ellington and His Orchestra
- Released: August 1940
- Recorded: July 22, 1940
- Studio: Victor Studios, New York
- Genre: Jazz; big band
- Label: RCA Victor
- Songwriter: Duke Ellington

"Harlem Air Shaft" is a piece of music composed by American jazz composer and musician Duke Ellington, first recorded for RCA Victor and released in 1940. Featured in 38 recordings since, it was a popular piece in both Ellington's repertoire and among jazz trumpeters such as Clark Terry. It is generally considered programmatic by some composers and scholars, acting as a narration of everyday noises heard in 1930s New York City.

== Background ==
Ellington composed Harlem Air Shaft in 1940, during a time of relative creative freedom afforded by his contract with Victor. As Ellington noted in a 1944 interview published in The New Yorker, the composition was his attempt at capturing the essence of city life through music (though the exact inspiration for the piece and its working title has remained unclear). This is achieved through dramatic changes in key accompanied by colorful instrumentation. Professor Edward Green of the Manhattan School of Music describes Harlem Air Shaft as a piece of program music, or a series of musical "chapters" intended to create an experience similar to that of a book. Ellington recounted his inspiration in a 1944 interview published in The New Yorker:

So much goes on in a Harlem air shaft. You get the full essence of Harlem in an air shaft. You hear fights, you smell dinner, you hear people making love. You hear intimate gossip floating down. You hear the radio. An air shaft is one great big loudspeaker. You see your neighbor’s laundry. You hear the janitor’s dogs. The man upstairs’ aerial falls down and breaks your window. You smell coffee. A wonderful thing is that smell. An air shaft has got every contrast. One guy is cooking dried fish with rice and another guy’s got a great big turkey. Guy-with-fish’s wife is a terrific cooker but the guy’s wife with the turkey is doing a sad job. You hear people praying, fighting, snoring. Jitterbugs are jumping up and down always over you, never below you. That’s a funny thing about jitterbugs. They’re always over you. I tried to put all that in "Harlem Air Shaft."

== Structure ==
The introduction consists of 12 bars, divided into three four-bar segments marked by key changes. The following 32 bars structurally repeat these segments as three 8-bar choruses and one 4-bar refrain. Throughout the piece are subtle references to traditional African American tunes, such as a brief trombone part that resembles "I Love Bread and Butter" appearing during the introduction. Much of the improvisation is arpeggio-based, while the trumpet parts have a distinct blues-like style. The trumpet was played by Cootie Williams on the original July 1940 recording.

== The piece as a programmatic composition ==
The idea that the content of the music is programmatic, or entirely a product of the everyday 1940s New York City experience, is almost always associated with the piece. According to a 1940 interview with Ellington, it was inspired by everyday noises heard in New York City, specifically the namesake, air shaft, found between housing units. A program for Harlem Air Shaft, published by Richard O. Boyer in The New Yorker in 1944, was apparently provided by Ellington while the band was traveling. Yet, the narrative as provided by Ellington, while reflected in the title, is controversial; there is no evidence of a program written prior to the piece, and Ellington in later interviews appeared to embellish the details of the piece's narrative. Furthermore, there is a possibility that the piece was originally titled Once Over Lightly, a phrase written by Ellington on the original score.

== Critical reception ==
While Duke Ellington received nine Grammy Hall of Fame awards as well as twenty-four total Grammy nominations, Harlem Air Shaft never received any Grammy nominations or awards. While there was little said about this piece from critics at the time of its creation, many reviews can be found that have been published since Ellington's passing that praised his ability to perfectly encapsulate the natural sounds and atmosphere of early 1900s Harlem.

== See also ==
- List of program music
- List of 1930s jazz standards
- Ventilation shaft
- Duke Ellington discography
