= List of program music =

Program music is a term applied to any musical composition on the classical music tradition in which the piece is designed according to some preconceived narrative, or is designed to evoke a specific idea and atmosphere. This is distinct from the more traditional absolute music popular in the Baroque and Classical eras, in which the piece has no narrative program or ideas and is simply created for music's sake. Musical forms such as the symphonic poem, ballade, suite, overture and some compositions in freer forms are named as program music since they intended to bring out extra-musical elements like sights and incidents.

Opera, ballet, and Lieder could also trivially be considered program music since they are unintended to accompany vocal or stage performances. They will be excluded from this list except where they have been extensively popularised and played without the original vocals and/or stage performance.

The orchestral program music tradition is also continued in some pieces for jazz orchestras. For narrative or evocative popular music, please see Concept Album.

Any discussion of program music brings to mind Walt Disney's animated features Fantasia (1940) and Fantasia 2000 (1999), in which the Disney animators provided graphic visualisation of several famous pieces of program music. However, not all the pieces used in the films were particularly programmatic, and in most cases, the narratives illustrated by the animators were different from whatever programmatic narrative might have existed originally.

== List of program music by composer ==
=== Edmund Angerer ===
- Toy Symphony

=== Johann Sebastian Bach ===
- Capriccio for keyboard in B♭ "On the departure of a beloved brother" BWV 992
- St Matthew Passion BWV 244
- Many of Bach's cantatas contain elements that could be considered programmatic

=== P. D. Q. Bach ===
- 1712 Overture

=== Les Baxter ===
- Ritual of the Savage (1951)
- The Passions: featuring Bas Sheva (1954)

=== Ludwig van Beethoven ===
- Coriolan Overture, Op. 62 (1807); based on the story of Coriolanus
- Symphony No. 6, Pastoral, Op. 68 (1808); features titled movements, country dances, bird calls, and a storm.
- Leonore No. 3 Overture, Op. 72b (1806); one of a series of overtures composed for the opera Leonore, later renamed Fidelio. Leonore No. 3 is well known for portraying some of the major events of the plot in a condensed, purely orchestral form, most notably the distant trumpet fanfares of the finale. Next to the actual, finalized Fidelio overture, this is the most commonly performed version, and still sometimes replaces the Fidelio overture in some productions.
- Egmont Overture, Op. 84
- Wellington's Victory, Op. 91 is also known as the Battle Symphony and describes the battle between the French and British armies outside the Spanish town of Vitoria and the subsequent British victory. The work features rifles and cannons as instruments. It also makes use of Rule Britannia, which is used to describe the British, whereas the French side is announced by the French song Marlbrouk s'en va-t-en guerre.
- Piano Sonata in A flat Op. 26 (3rd movement subtitled "Death of a hero", 4th movement manifestly "Life goes on" in intent)
- Piano Sonata in D minor Op. 31 Nr. 2 ("Der Sturm", inspired by Shakespeare's The Tempest)
- Piano Sonata in E-flat major Op. 81a "Les Adieux"

=== Hector Berlioz ===
- Symphonie Fantastique, (1830)
- Harold in Italy, based on Childe Harold's Pilgrimage by Lord Byron, (1834)
- Romeo et Juliette, symphonie dramatique

=== Benjamin Britten ===
- Four Sea Interludes, (1945) — Britten extracted four of the six interludes from his opera Peter Grimes for performance as a stand-alone orchestral piece. "I. Dawn," "II. Sunday Morning" (describing a seaside community gathering to worship), "III. Moonlight," and "IV. Storm" were all meant to describe these scenes and images through Britten's music literally.

=== Anton Bruckner ===
- Symphony No. 4 in E-flat major, "Romantic" — The program, involving medieval castles and dawn and royal hunts, appears to have been an afterthought like it was with the other Symphonies, but the validity of it, in this case, is supported by the subtitle given to the work, the only one of Bruckner's Symphonies to have been given a subtitle by the composer himself.

=== Michael Colgrass ===
- Winds of Nagual

=== Aaron Copland ===
- Appalachian Spring
- Billy the Kid
- Lincoln Portrait
- Rodeo

=== Claude Debussy ===
Debussy wrote more or less entirely in the 'program' style; see List of compositions by Claude Debussy

=== Paul Dukas ===
- The Sorcerer's Apprentice

=== Antonín Dvořák ===
- Symphony No. 9, From the New World, which is associated with The Song of Hiawatha and describes the composer's impressions of America.
- The Water Goblin
- The Noon Witch
- A Hero's Song
- Four Overtures:
  - Hussite Overture
  - In Nature's Realm
  - Carnival
  - Othello

=== Edward Elgar ===
Many of Elgar's works are associated with favourite places, mostly in Herefordshire and Worcestershire where he lived, and his MSS are often noted as such

- Variations on an Original Theme (Enigma), Op. 36, a series of musical portraits of the composer's friends (and in one case their dog as well), and incidents associated with them. In addition a secret underlying "Enigma" theme runs through the whole work, which has never been definitely discovered
- Sea Pictures
- Overture Cockaigne (In London Town), Op. 40
- The Wand of Youth, Opp. 1a and 1b, two suites based on music he had written as a child
- Overture In the South (Alassio), Op. 50
- Falstaff, symphonic study, Op. 68
- The Severn Suite, Op. 85, for brass band
- Nursery Suite

=== Duke Ellington ===
- Harlem Air Shaft

=== Alexander Glazunov ===
Alexander Konstantinovich Glazunov was a prolific composer of symphonic poems, independent overtures and fantasias, who often drew his inspiration from history.

- To the Memory of a Hero, elegy for orchestra, Op. 8
- Stenka Razin, Op. 13
- The Forest, fantasy for orchestra, Op. 19
- Slavonian Feast, symphonic sketches, Op. 26A
- The Sea, fantasy for orchestra, Op. 28
- Oriental Rhapsody, Op. 29
- The Kremlin, symphonic picture in three parts, Op. 30
- The Spring, symphonic picture, Op. 34
- Carnaval, overture for large orchestra and organ, Op. 45
- From Dark into Light, fantasy for orchestra, Op. 53
- Solemn Overture, Op. 73
- From the Middle Ages, suite for orchestra, Op. 79
- The Song of Destiny, dramatic overture, Op. 84
- Russian Fantasy for balalaika-orchestra, Op. 86
- To the Memory of Gogol, symphonic prologue, Op. 87
- Finnish Fantasy for orchestra, Op. 88
- Finnish Sketches for orchestra, Op. 89
- Karelian Legend, Op. 99
- Poème épique, Op. posth.

=== George Gershwin ===
- An American in Paris
- Cuban Overture

=== Edvard Grieg ===
- Peer Gynt, originally a selection from incidental music and a song for the play Peer Gynt by Henrik Ibsen, but now is almost always played by itself.
- Lyric Pieces
- Wedding Day at Troldhaugen

=== Ferde Grofé ===
- Grand Canyon Suite, (1931). Named sections illustrate "Sunrise," "The Painted Desert," "On the Trail," "Sunset" and "Cloudburst." "On the Trail" is the familiar section with a mule's braying and hoofbeats. "Cloudburst," another musical storm, was described by Toscanini as "vivid and terrifying."

=== Robin Holloway ===
- Domination of Black op.23, for orchestra after a poem of Wallace Stevens
- Europa & the Bull op.121, for solo tuba and orchestra after Ovid
- Phaeton's Journey: Son of the Sun op.131, for solo trumpet and orchestra after Ovid

=== Alan Hovhaness ===
- Storm on Mount Wildcat
- Sosi – Forest of Prophetic Sounds
- Vision from High Rock
- Mysterious Mountain (Symphony No.2)
- Macedonian Mountain Dance
- Fantasy on Japanese Wood Prints
- And God Created Great Whales (orchestra with humpbacked whale songs)
- Vishnu Symphony (Symphony No.19)
- Majnun Symphony (Symphony No.24)
- Odysseus Symphony (Symphony No.25)
- Mount St. Helens Symphony (Symphony No.50)

=== Augusta Holmès ===
- Irlande
- Pologne

=== Charles Ives ===
- The Celestial Railroad
- Central Park in the Dark
- String Quartet No. 2 ("Discussions", "Arguments", and "The Call of the Mountains")
- A Symphony: New England Holidays
- Three Places in New England
- The Unanswered Question
- Yale-Princeton Football Game

=== Leoš Janáček ===
- Taras Bulba, rhapsody for orchestra based on the novella by Nikolai Gogol

=== Albert Ketèlbey ===
Most of the better-known compositions of Ketèlbey are strongly programmatic, including:

- In a Monastery Garden
- In a Persian Market
- In the Mystic Land of Egypt
- Bells across the Meadows
- With Honour Crowned

=== Franz Liszt ===
Liszt is considered the inventor of the symphonic poem and his programmatic orchestral works set the framework for several composers of the romantic era. He composed a total of thirteen symphonic poems as well as two programmatic symphonies, drawing his inspiration from a variety of literary, mythological, historical and artistic sources.

- Ce qu'on entend sur la montagne (What is heard on the mountain), after a poem by Victor Hugo
- Tasso, Lamento e Trionfo, based on stories by Byron and Goethe on the life of the poet Torquato Tasso
- Les Préludes, based on Lamartine
- Orpheus
- Prometheus
- Mazeppa, based on Hugo and Byron
- Festklänge (Festival Sounds)
- Héroïde funèbre
- From the Cradle to the Grave
- Hungaria
- Hamlet, based on the play by Shakespeare
- Hunnenschlacht (Battle of the Huns), based on a monumental fresco by painter Wilhelm von Kaulbach depicting the battle between Emperor Theoderic and Attila the Hun in 451
- Die Ideale based on a work by Friedrich von Schiller
- Faust Symphony, after the epic work by Goethe
- Dante Symphony, after Dante's Divine Comedy

=== Frederik Magle ===
- The Hope (2001), depicting the battle of Copenhagen

=== Gustav Mahler ===
Much of Mahler's early work was designed programmatically. However, he made serious efforts to downplay the programmatic reputation of many of these pieces later in his life, including removing some of the programmatic titles from his symphonies.

- Symphony No. 1, Titan, (1888)
- Symphony No. 2, Resurrection, (1894)
- Symphony No. 3, (1896)
- Das Lied von der Erde

=== Felix Mendelssohn ===
- Calm Sea and Prosperous Voyage
- The Hebrides

=== Olivier Messiaen ===
- La Nativite du Seigneur (The Nativity of Our Lord), strongly programmatic series of organ pieces
- Des Canyons au Etoiles ("From the Canyons to the Stars"), on the natural beauty of the United States
- Catalogue d'oiseaux ("Catalog of Birds")
- Oiseaux exotiques

=== Modest Mussorgsky ===
- Pictures at an Exhibition; movements represent a series of paintings and the promenade of a viewer around the gallery
- Night on Bald Mountain

=== Carl Nielsen ===
- Helios Overture, Op. 17

=== Maurice Ravel ===
- Daphnis et Chloé
- La Valse
- Jeux d'eau
- Miroirs suite
- Gaspard de la nuit
- Ma mère l'oye
- Pavane pour une infante défunte

=== Ottorino Respighi ===
- I pini di Roma ("The Pines of Rome"), 1923–1924
- Vetrate di Chiesa ("Church Windows"), 1926
- Gli Uccelli ("The Birds"), 1927
- Le fontane di Roma ("The Fountains of Rome"), 1915–1916
- Feste Romane ("Roman Festivals"), 1928

=== Terry Riley ===
- Chanting the Light of Foresight, with Rova Saxophone Quartet

=== Nikolai Rimsky-Korsakov ===
- Scheherazade, Op. 35, (1888). Symphonic suite after the “Thousand and One Nights”. Section titles such as "The Sea and Sinbad's Ship," "Festival in Baghdad."
- Antar - symphony No. 2, later published as a symphonic suite.
- Sadko, Op. 5 - described as a Musical Picture
- Night on Mt Triglav - extracted from the opera “Mlada”
- Skazka - “Fairy Tale” inspired by Pushkin.
- The Snow Maiden - suite from the opera “Snegurochka”
- Christmas Eve - suite from the opera
- The Invisible City of Kitezh - suite from the opera
- The Golden Cockerel - suite from the opera

Plus many other works inspired by myths and fairy tales

=== Gioachino Rossini ===
- William Tell Overture

=== Camille Saint-Saëns ===
- Phaéton, Op. 39
- Danse Macabre, Op. 40 (1874)
- The Carnival of the Animals, (1886)

=== Arnold Schoenberg ===
- Verklärte Nacht, Op. 4 ("Transfigured Night"), 1899 Romantic musical portrait of a moonlight forest walk, from Richard Dehmel's poem

=== Peter Seabourne ===
- Symphony of Roses, for orchestra after poems by W. B. Yeats and a painting by Jack Yeats
- Tu Sospiri?, for orchestra related to Nancy Storace and Mozart
- The Darkness of Ages, tone poem for orchestra inspired by a description of a well by Leos Janacek
- My River, septet based on a poem of Emily Dickinson

=== Jean Sibelius ===
Sibelius composed several tone poems throughout his career, often making use of stories and motifs from the Finnish national epic, the Kalevala. Early in his career he also wrote works on national and historical subjects.

- Finlandia
- Kullervo, Op. 7, symphonic poem based on the story of Kullervo in Finnish mythology
- En saga, Op. 9
- Karelia Suite, Op. 11
- Lemminkäinen Legends, Op. 22, four symphonic poems based on the story of Lemminkäinen in the Kalevala
- The Dryad, Op. 45 No. 1
- Pohjola's Daughter, Op. 49, tone poem based on a story from the Kalevala
- Nightride and Sunrise, Op. 55
- The Bard, Op. 64
- Luonnotar, Op. 70
- The Oceanides, Op.73
- Tapiola, Op. 112

=== Bedřich Smetana ===
- Má vlast, 1874–1879
- String Quartet No. 1, From my life

=== William Grant Still ===
- Symphony No. 1 "Afro-American"
- Symphony No. 2 in G minor, "Song of a New Race"

=== Richard Strauss ===
A major developer of the tone poem as a musical form, Strauss displayed outstanding skill at musical description. He claimed that he was capable of "describing a knife and fork" in music, and said that a sensitive listener to Don Juan could discern the hair color of Don Juan's amorous partners.

- Don Juan, Op. 20 (1889)
- Macbeth, Op. 23
- Tod und Verklärung ("Death and Transfiguration") Op. 24 (1889)
- Till Eulenspiegels lustige Streiche ("Till Eulenspiegel's merry pranks"), Op. 28
- Also Sprach Zarathustra ("Thus Spoke Zarathustra"), Op. 30 (1896)
- Don Quixote, Op. 35 (1897)
- Ein Heldenleben ("A hero's life"), Op. 40
- Symphonia Domestica ("Domestic Symphony"), Op. 53 (1903). A musical description of the composer's personal daily life, including an unflattering musical picture of Frau Strauss
- Eine Alpensinfonie ("An Alpine Symphony"), Op. 64 (1915). A work with twenty-two named narrative sections describing the ascent of an alpine mountain. A section of the work depicts a thunderstorm, with perhaps the most realistic thunder-and-lightning in orchestral music.
- Duett-Concertino (1947), depicting a princess and a bear.

=== Pyotr Ilyich Tchaikovsky ===
- Romeo and Juliet Fantasy Overture (1869; revised 1870, 1880)
- The Tempest Symphonic Fantasia after Shakespeare, Op. 18 (1873)
- Hamlet Overture-Fantasia, Op. 67a (1888)
  - The above three works are based on plays by Shakespeare
- Francesca da Rimini, Op. 32 (1876) is based on Dante's Inferno.
- Manfred Symphony in four scenes after the dramatic poem by Byron, Op. 58
- The 1812 Overture (1882) famously uses different themes to represent the French and Russian armies in the Napoleonic Wars, and concludes with the firing of cannons and the ringing of the church bells.

=== Nobuo Uematsu ===
- Final Fantasy Many different themes over the video game series representing different characters and situations

=== Richard Wagner ===
- Siegfried Idyll

=== Ralph Vaughan Williams ===
- The Lark Ascending
- Sinfonia Antartica About the explorer Captain Scott's doomed expedition to the south pole, arranged from his film score

== See also ==
- List of symphonic poems
