= The Little Train of the Caipira =

Orchestral piece by Heitor Villa-Lobos

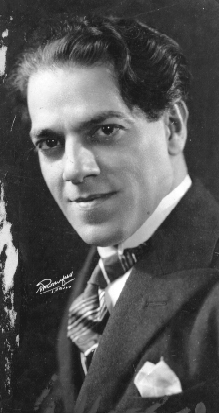
Heitor Villa-Lobos, c. 1922

"The Little Train of the Caipira" is the subtitle for the Toccata movement that concludes an orchestral suite written by Brazilian composer Heitor Villa-Lobos in 1930, titled Bachianas brasileiras No. 2.

== Overview ==
The Toccata is approximately 4 to 5 minutes long. The subtitle refers to the local trains, drawn by steam locomotives, in the small communities of the Brazilian interior, the noises of which are imitated in the composition (Slonimsky 1945, 147). It does not follow a program, but rather suggests the train and its movement through the countryside by all the textural elements of the music—least of all through its classically balanced melodic construction. The concluding chords are particularly interesting for their anticipation of a recurrent sort of atmospheric effect found later in the writing for strings by composers such as Giacinto Scelsi, György Ligeti, and Krzysztof Penderecki (Salles 2009, 110).

== Composition ==
In the year of composition, 1930, Villa-Lobos transcribed this movement for cello and piano, titled simply O trenzinho do caipira. This arrangement, which lasts about two minutes in performance, was premiered in São Paulo–Pirajuí in 1930, with Villa-Lobos himself playing the cello and João de Souza Lima the piano. The original, orchestral version was only first performed (in the context of the complete Bachianas No. 2) on 3 September 1934, at the Venice International Festival, with an orchestra conducted by Dimitri Mitropoulos (Appleby 1988, 64–65).

An opposed point of view holds that the orchestral Bachianas No. 2 was put together from preexistent and unrelated pieces, three originally for cello and piano (O canto do capadócio, O canto da nossa terra, and O trenzinho do caipira), the other (Lembrança do sertão) for solo piano (Peppercorn 1991a, 103; Peppercorn 1991b, 33–34).

An unrelated a cappella chorus composition by Villa-Lobos, Trenzinho, setting a text by Catarina Santoro, was written in 1933, and premiered on 10 October 1939 by the choir of the Escola Argentina (Rio de Janeiro), conducted by the composer. Originally for three-part chorus, it was also adapted for four-part female chorus, in which form it was published in 1951 as number 31 in volume 2 of the composer's collection, Canto orfeônico (Appleby 1988, 79 and 111).
