= Bachianas Brasileiras =

Series of nine suites by the Brazilian composer Heitor Villa-Lobos

Heitor Villa-Lobos at the end of a concert in Tel Aviv, 1952

The Bachianas Brasileiras (Portuguese pronunciation: [bakiˈɐ̃nɐz bɾaziˈlejɾɐs]) (an approximate English translation might be Bach-inspired Brazilian pieces) are a series of nine suites by the Brazilian composer Heitor Villa-Lobos, written for various combinations of instruments and voices between 1930 and 1945. They represent a fusion of Brazilian folk and popular music on the one hand and the style of Johann Sebastian Bach on the other, as an attempt to freely adapt a number of Baroque harmonic and contrapuntal procedures to Brazilian music. Most of the movements in each suite have two titles: one "Bachian" (Preludio, Fuga, etc.), the other Brazilian (Embolada, O canto da nossa terra, etc.).

In the Bachianas, Villa-Lobos employs the counterpoint and harmonic complexity typical of Bach's music and combines it with the lyrical quality of operatic singing and Brazilian song. The listener experiences the charm of the Brazilian landscape; the energy of Brazilian dance; the color, dissonance and expression of early 20th-century Brazilian modernism; and the refreshing originality of Villa-Lobos' compositional style.

== Pieces ==
=== No. 1 ===
Scored for orchestra of cellos and dedicated to Pablo Casals, Bachianas Brasileiras No. 1 (1930) consists of three movements:

1. Introdução (Embolada)
2. Prelúdio (Modinha)
3. Fuga (Conversa) (Conversation)

=== No. 2 ===
Scored for orchestra, Bachianas Brasileiras No. 2 (1930) consists of four movements:

1. Preludio (O canto do capadocio) (Note: Despite the five translations—French, English, Italian, Spanish, and German—printed in the score, the composer's own notes on this movement make it clear that the meaning of capadocio is not "campagnard", "countryman", "campagnolo", etc., but rather "Teddy boy" or "layabout".)
2. Aria (O canto da nossa terra)
3. Dansa (Lembrança do Sertão) (Memento of the Sertão)
4. Toccata (O Trenzinho (Note: misspelled in the score: "Tremzinho") do Caipira — The Little Train of the Caipira) (Note: "Caipira" is a term of Tupi origin, associated with the Caipira people and their culture, originating in the state of São Paulo.)

According to one opinion, the third movement was later transcribed for piano, and the others for cello and piano. According to another, it was the other way around: three pieces for cello and piano and a solo piano piece, none of them connected with each other and none of them originally with any Bach associations, were brought together and scored for chamber orchestra.

This work is scored for flute, oboe, clarinet, tenor and baritone saxophones, bassoon, contrabassoon, 2 horns, trombone, timpani, ganzá, chocalho, pandeira, reco, matraca, caixa, triangle, cymbals, tam-tam, bass drum, celesta, piano, and strings.

=== No. 3 ===
Scored for piano and orchestra, Bachianas Brasileiras No. 3 (1938) consists of four movements:

1. Prelúdio (Ponteio)
2. Fantasia (Devaneio) (Digression)
3. Ária (Modinha)
4. Toccata (Picapau) (Woodpecker)

The orchestral forces for this work, in addition to the solo piano, are: piccolo, 2 flutes, 2 oboes, cor anglais, 2 clarinets, bass clarinet, 2 bassoons, contrabassoon, 4 horns, 2 trumpets, 4 trombones, tuba, timpani, bass drum, tam-tam, xylophone, and strings.

CBS radio premiered Bachianas Brasileras No. 3 on February 19, 1947, New York with José Vieira Brandão (piano), CBS Orchestra, Villa-Lobos (conductor)

=== No. 4 ===
Scored for piano in 1930–41 and orchestrated in 1942, Bachianas Brasileiras No. 4 consists of four movements:

1. Prelúdio (Introdução) (dedicated to Tomas Terán)
2. Coral (Canto do Sertão) (dedicated to José Vieira Brandão)
3. Ária (Cantiga) (dedicated to Sylvio Salema)
4. Danza (Miudinho) (dedicated to Antonieta Rudge Müller)

The Bachiana Brasileira No. 4 begins with the beautiful Prelúdio (Introdução) (lit: introduction) and features broad lyrical melodies in lush imitative passages. The title of the second movement, Coral (Canto do Sertão) (song of the hinterlands), refers to a song from the arid backlands of the Brazilian northeast. The movement features a clear lyrical melody in a polyphonic setting that ends with a powerful homophonic texture typical of Bach's Lutheran chorales. In Ária (Cantiga), Villa-Lobos borrows a beautiful and nostalgic northeastern Brazilian melody about the sertão and uses it as a cantus firmus for the composition. The final movement, Danza (miudinho), is a bright and energetic dance-like piece subtitled Miudinho, which is a reference to the small playful-like steps typical of a number of Brazilian dance forms such as samba, forró, and capoeira (an African-influenced Brazilian martial art form).

The orchestral version is scored for piccolo, 2 flutes, 2 oboes, cor anglais, 2 clarinets, bass clarinets, 2 bassoons, contrabassoon, 4 horns, 3 trumpets, 3 trombones, tuba, timpani, bass drum, tam-tam, xylophone, celesta, and strings. The first movement (Prelúdio) is scored for strings alone.

=== No. 5 ===
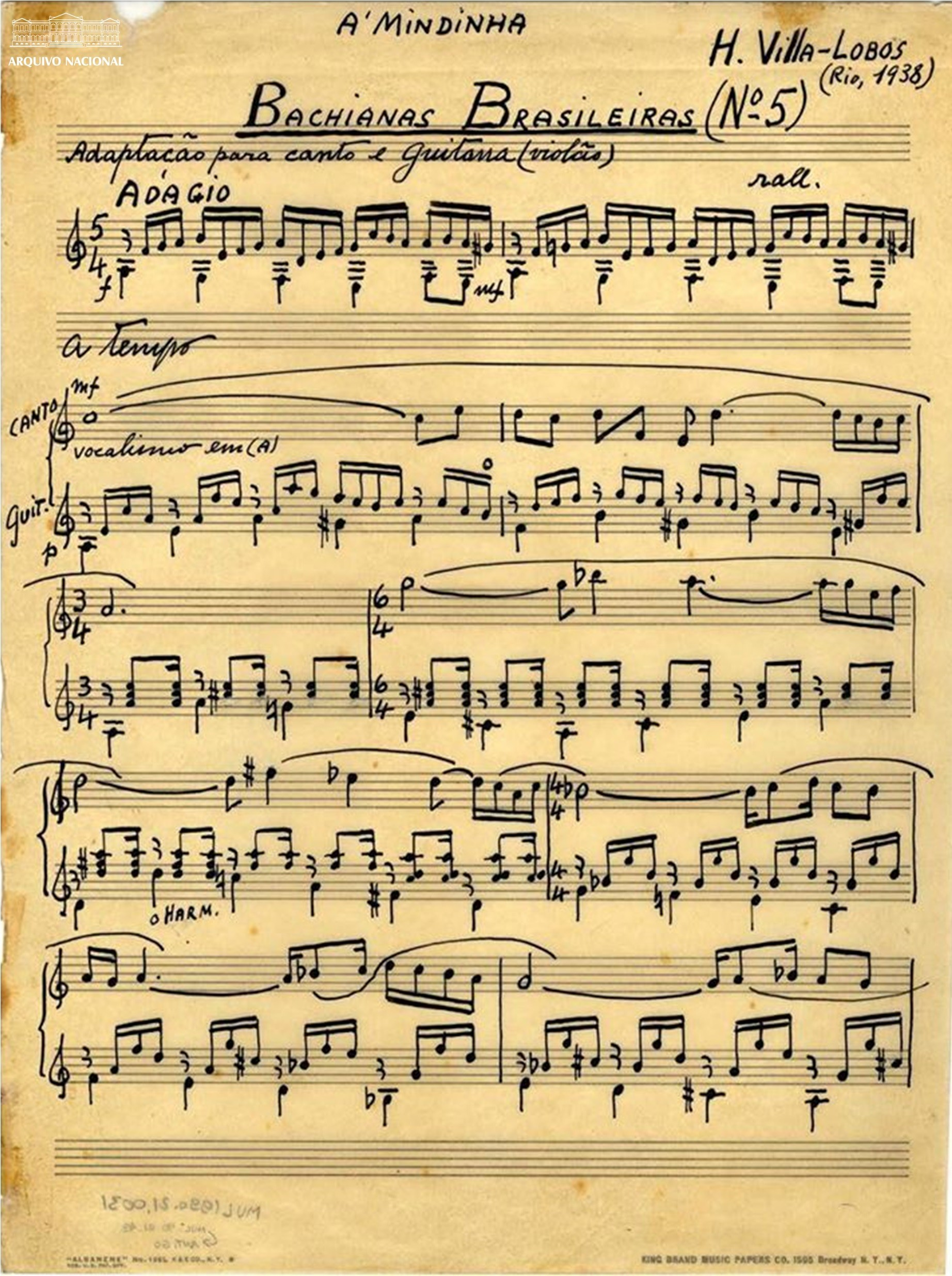
Bachianas Brasileiras No. 5

Scored for soprano and orchestra of eight cellos and dedicated to Arminda Villa-Lobos, Bachianas Brasileiras No. 5 (1938/45) consists of two movements:

1. Ária (Cantilena) (lyrics by Ruth V. Corrêa)
2. Dança (Martelo) (lyrics by Manuel Bandeira).

The Ária was later arranged for solo soprano with guitar accompaniment by Villa-Lobos). This Aria is Villa-Lobos's best-known work. English translation:

In the evening, a dreamy, pretty cloud, slow and transparent, covers outer space with pink. In the infinite the moon rises sweetly, beautifying the evening, like a friendly girl who prepares herself and dreamily makes the evening beautiful. A soul anxious to be pretty shouts to the sky, the land, all of Nature. The birds silence themselves to her complaints, and the sea reflects all of Her [the moon's] wealth. The gentle light of the moon now awakens the cruel saudade [nostalgic or melancholic longing] that laughs and cries. In the evening, a dreamy, pretty cloud, slow and transparent, covers outer space with pink.

The musical form of the Danca is embolada, a rapid poem/song of the Brazilian Northeast. It is a poem of nostalgia (saudade) for the birds of the Cariri Mountains, in the state of Ceará. The lyrics contain a list of species of birds: ben-te-vi (Pitangus sulphuratus), sabiá (Turdus fumigatus), juriti (Leptotila rufaxilla), irerê (Dendrocygna viduata), patativa (Sporophila leucoptera), cambaxirra (Odontorchilus cinereus). The music imitates bird song: "La! liá! liá! liá! liá! liá!" "Sing more", the words say, "to remember Cariri" ("Canta mais! canta mais! prá alembrá o Cariri!")

=== No. 6 ===
Scored for flute and bassoon, Bachianas Brasileiras No. 6 (1938) consists of two movements:

1. Ária (Chôro)
2. Fantasia

=== No. 7 ===
Scored for symphony orchestra and dedicated to Gustavo Capanema, Bachianas Brasileiras No. 7 (1942) consists of four movements:

1. Prelúdio (Ponteio)
2. Giga (Quadrilha caipira)
3. Tocata (Repente) (Dare)
4. Fuga (Conversa)

This work is scored for piccolo, 2 flutes, 2 oboes, cor anglais, 2 clarinets, bass clarinet, 2 bassoons, contrabassoon, 4 horns, 3 trumpets, 4 trombones, tuba, timpani, tam-tam, xylophone, coconut shell, bass drum, celesta, harp and strings.

=== No. 8 ===
Scored for symphony orchestra and dedicated to Mindinha, Bachianas Brasileiras No. 8 (1944) consists of four movements:

1. Prelúdio
2. Ária (Modinha)
3. Tocata (Catira batida)
4. Fuga

This work is scored for piccolo, 2 flutes, 2 oboes, cor anglais, 2 clarinets, bass clarinet, 2 bassoons, contrabassoon, 4 horns, 4 trumpets, 4 trombones, tuba, timpani, tam-tam, xylophone, 3 wood blocks (high, medium and low), tarol, bass drum, celesta, and strings.

The last movement was also arranged for four-part a cappella choir.

=== No. 9 ===
Scored for chorus or string orchestra, Bachianas Brasileiras No. 9 (1945) consists of two movements:

1. Prélude
2. Fugue

== Ambiguities in the scores ==
Because Villa-Lobos dashed off compositions in feverish haste and preferred writing new pieces to revising and correcting already completed ones, numerous slips of the pen, miscalculations, impracticalities or even impossibilities, imprecise notations, uncertainty in specification of instruments, and other problems inescapably remain in the printed scores of the Bachianas, and require performers to take unusual care to decipher what the composer actually intended. In the frequent cases where both the score and the parts are wrong, the recordings made by the composer are the only means of determining what he actually intended.

== Recordings ==
Villa-Lobos made a number of recordings of the Bachianas Brasileiras, including a complete recording of all nine compositions made in Paris for EMI in the 1950s, with the French National Orchestra and Victoria de los Ángeles as the soprano soloist in No. 5. These landmark recordings were issued in several configurations on LP and were later reissued on CD. Other musicians, including Joan Baez, Bidu Sayão, Enrique Bátiz, Leonard Bernstein, Felicja Blumental, Nelson Freire, Leila Guimarães, Barbara Hendricks, Werner Janssen, Kiri Te Kanawa, Isaac Karabtchevsky, Jesús López-Cobos, Cristina Ortiz, Aldo Parisot, Menahem Pressler, Mstislav Rostropovich, Kenneth Schermerhorn, Felix Slatkin, Leopold Stokowski, Michael Tilson Thomas, and Galina Vishnevskaya, have subsequently recorded some or all of the music.

== See also ==
- -ana, for other musical works using the suffix "-ana" to pay homage to another composer
