= Program music =

Instrumental musical rendition of a narrative

Program music or programmatic music is a type of instrumental music that attempts to musically render an extramusical narrative or description of some aspect of the world. The term was invented in the 19th century by Franz Liszt, who himself composed a great deal of program music. However, as Liszt himself noted, program music had been written for centuries before his time.

To give an example, Ludwig van Beethoven's Sixth Symphony narrates a visit to the countryside, portraying in succession a happy arrival, a quiet moment by a brook, an encounter with dancing peasants, a thunderstorm, and the peasants' song of thanksgiving when the storm is over. Program music is often written so that the notes themselves convey, at least to some degree, the meaning of what is portrayed; thus the thunderstorm in Beethoven's symphony includes loud timpani strokes to convey the thunder and shrill piccolo music to depict the shrieking winds.

Sung music, such as opera, oratorio, or lieder is not considered program music as such, even when a story is told, since the story is given directly in the lyrics and not the music itself.

Often, program music is accompanied by written material that clarifies the program for listeners. Beethoven's program is given in the subtitles he gave to the movements in the musical score, along with a few notations identifying the bird calls. For his Symphonie fantastique, Hector Berlioz wrote a detailed program and asked that it be distributed to concert audiences before performances. Each of the four parts of Antonio Vivaldi's The Four Seasons is affiliated with an Italian-language sonnet that describes what is being portrayed.

Program music has been composed throughout the European classical music tradition, particularly during the Romantic period of the 19th century. Single-movement orchestral pieces of program music, which flourished in the 19th century, are often called symphonic poems or tone poems.

The term absolute music is sometimes used to designate non-program music, intended to be appreciated without any particular reference to the outside world.

== History ==
=== 16th and 17th centuries ===
Composers of the Renaissance wrote a fair amount of program music, especially for the harpsichord, including works such as Martin Peerson's The Fall of the Leafe and William Byrd's The Battell. For the latter work, the composer provided a written description of the sections.

=== 18th century ===
In the Baroque era, Vivaldi's The Four Seasons has poetic inscriptions in the score referring to each of the seasons, evoking spring, summer, autumn, and winter. An example of program music by J. S. Bach is his Capriccio on the departure of a beloved brother, BWV 992.

Program music was perhaps less often composed in the Classical era. At that time, perhaps more than any other, music achieved drama from its own internal resources, notably in works written in sonata form. Some of Joseph Haydn's earlier symphonies may be program music for which the program is lost; for example, the composer once said that one of his earlier symphonies represents "God speaking to an unrepentant sinner". It is not known which of his symphonies Haydn was referring to, although it is theorized to be the first movement of his Symphony No. 22. His Symphony No. 8 also includes a movement named "La tempesta" that represents a storm. A minor Classical-era composer, Carl Ditters von Dittersdorf, wrote a series of programmatic symphonies based on Ovid's Metamorphoses. German composer Justin Heinrich Knecht's Le portrait musical de la nature, ou Grande sinfonie (Musical Portrait of Nature or Grand Symphony) from 1784–1785 is another 18th century example, anticipating Beethoven's Sixth Symphony by twenty years.

=== 19th century ===
Program music particularly flourished in the Romantic era.

Ludwig van Beethoven felt a certain reluctance in writing program music, and said of his 1808 Symphony No. 6 (Pastoral) that the "whole work can be perceived without description – it is more an expression of feelings rather than tone-painting".. Yet the work clearly contains depictions of bird calls, a flowing brook, a storm, and so on. Beethoven later returned to program music with his Piano Sonata Op. 81a, Les Adieux, which depicts the departure and return of his friend and patron the Archduke Rudolf.

Hector Berlioz's Symphonie fantastique was a musical narration of a hyperbolically emotional love story, whose real-life basis was the composer's intense passion for the actress Harriet Smithson. Franz Liszt provided explicit programs for many of his piano pieces and he was also the inventor of the term symphonic poem. In 1874, Modest Mussorgsky composed for piano a series of pieces describing seeing a gallery of ten of his friend's paintings and drawings in his Pictures at an Exhibition, later orchestrated by many composers including Maurice Ravel. The French composer Camille Saint-Saëns wrote many short pieces of program music which he called Tone Poems. His most famous are probably the Danse macabre and several movements from the Carnival of the Animals. The composer Paul Dukas is perhaps best known for his tone poem The Sorcerer's Apprentice, based on a tale from Goethe.

Possibly the most adept at musical depiction in his program music was German composer Richard Strauss. His symphonic poems include Death and Transfiguration (portraying a dying man and his entry into heaven), Don Juan (based on the ancient legend of Don Juan), Till Eulenspiegel's Merry Pranks (based on episodes in the career of the legendary German figure Till Eulenspiegel), Don Quixote (portraying episodes in the life of Miguel de Cervantes's character, Don Quixote), A Hero's Life (which depicts episodes in the life of an unnamed hero often taken to be Strauss himself) and Symphonia Domestica (which portrays episodes in the composer's own married life, including putting the baby to bed). Strauss is reported to have said that music can describe anything, even a teaspoon.

Another composer of programmatic music was Nikolai Rimsky-Korsakov, whose colorful "musical pictures" include "Sadko", Op. 5, after the Russian Bylina, about the minstrel who sings to the Tsar of the Sea, the famous "'Scheherazade", Op. 35, after the Arabian Nights entertainments (where the heroine is depicted by a violin and whose stories include "Sinbad the Sailor") and any number of orchestral suites from his operas, including The Tale of Tsar Saltan (which also contains "Flight of the Bumblebee"), The Golden Cockerel, Christmas Eve, The Snow Maiden, and The Legend of The Invisible City of Kitezh.

In Scandinavia, Sibelius explored the Kalevala legend in several tone poems, most famously in The Swan of Tuonela.

One of the most famous programs, because it has never been definitively identified, is the secret non-musical idea or theme – the "Enigma" – that underlies Edward Elgar's Variations on an Original Theme (Enigma) of 1899. The composer disclosed it to certain friends, but at his request they never made it public.

In the 19th century, program music served an important role in changing composers' conception of musical form. Their 18th century predecessors often relied on well-defined formal patterns of composition, most notably sonata form. With the new prominence of program music, it became possible to use the program itself as the main, or only, basis for the organization of a musical composition. Indeed, per Scruton, Liszt "considered the idea of exalting the narrative associations of music into a principle of composition to be incompatible with the continuance of traditional symphonic forms".

=== 20th century ===
During the late-nineteenth and twentieth century, the increased influence of modernism and other anti-Romantic trends contributed to a decline in esteem for program music, but audiences continued to enjoy such pieces as Arthur Honegger's depiction of a steam locomotive in Pacific 231 (1923). Indeed, Percy Grainger's incomplete orchestral fragment Train Music employs the same function. This music for large orchestra depicts a train moving in the mountains of Italy. Heitor Villa-Lobos similarly depicted a rural steam-driven train in The Little Train of the Caipira (1930).

Indeed, an entire genre sprang up in the 1920s, particularly in the Soviet Union, of picturesque music depicting machines and factories. Well-known examples include Alexander Mosolov's Iron Foundry (1926–27) and Sergei Prokofiev's Le Pas d'acier (The Steel Step, 1926). An example from outside of the Soviet Union is George Antheil's Ballet mécanique (1923–24).

Ottorino Respighi composed a number of tone poems in the 1910s and 1920s, notably three works on different aspects of the city of Rome. Gustav Holst's The Planets is another well-known example, as is Russian composer Sergei Rachmaninoff's Isle of the Dead. Although written originally for the film Dangerous Moonlight, British composer Richard Addinsell's Warsaw Concerto was one of the first pieces of orchestral music composed for a film to achieve popularity in concert halls as well.

== Representational music vis-à-vis program music ==
Heinrich Ignaz Biber's Sonata representativa (for violin and continuo), which depicts various animals (the nightingale, the cuckoo, the cat) in a humoristic manner. This is perhaps program music but perhaps instead illustrates a distinction between "representational" music and program music properly speaking, It is possible for music to depict particular things or events, sometimes quite briefly, without actually having a program.

== Related types: ballet, incidental music, opera, and film ==
Music that is composed to accompany a ballet could be considered program music, even when presented separately as a concert piece; many of the classic works of the ballet repertoire, such as Tchaikovsky's Swan Lake, have a storyline that the music serves to illustrate. A similar case is incidental music to stage plays, such as Mendelssohn's incidental music to Shakespeare's A Midsummer Night's Dream. While operas themselves are not program music, their overtures often highlight episodes from the plot to come; thus the climax of Beethoven's Leonore Overture No. 3 (intended originally as the overture to Fidelio) involves the trumpet calls that signal the dramatic rescue of Leonora and Florestan in Act II. Mozart's overture to Don Giovanni opens with the terrifying music that much later accompanies the visit of the ghost of the Commendatore, at the climax of the opera.

Film scores could also be considered as program music. Influenced by the late Romantic work of Nikolai Rimsky-Korsakov, Ottorino Respighi, Richard Strauss, and others, motion picture soundtrack composers took up the banner of programmatic music following the advent of "talkies" in the 20th century. Some film scores, such as Prokofiev's music for Alexander Nevsky and Lieutenant Kijé (film), are arranged by the composer for concert performance, thus becoming mainstream instances of program music.

== Programmatic music and abstract imagery ==
A good deal of program music falls in between the realm of purely programmatic and purely absolute, with titles that clearly suggest an extramusical association, but no detailed story that can be followed and no musical passages that can be unequivocally identified with specific images. Examples would include Dvořák's Symphony No. 9, From the New World or Beethoven's Symphony No. 3, Eroica.

== See also ==
- Character piece
- Figurative art
- Film music
- Incidental music
- List of program music
- List of symphonic poems
- Mickey Mousing
- Representation (arts)
- Sakadas of Argos
- Word painting
