= Darker America (Still) =

1924 symphonic poem by William Grant Still

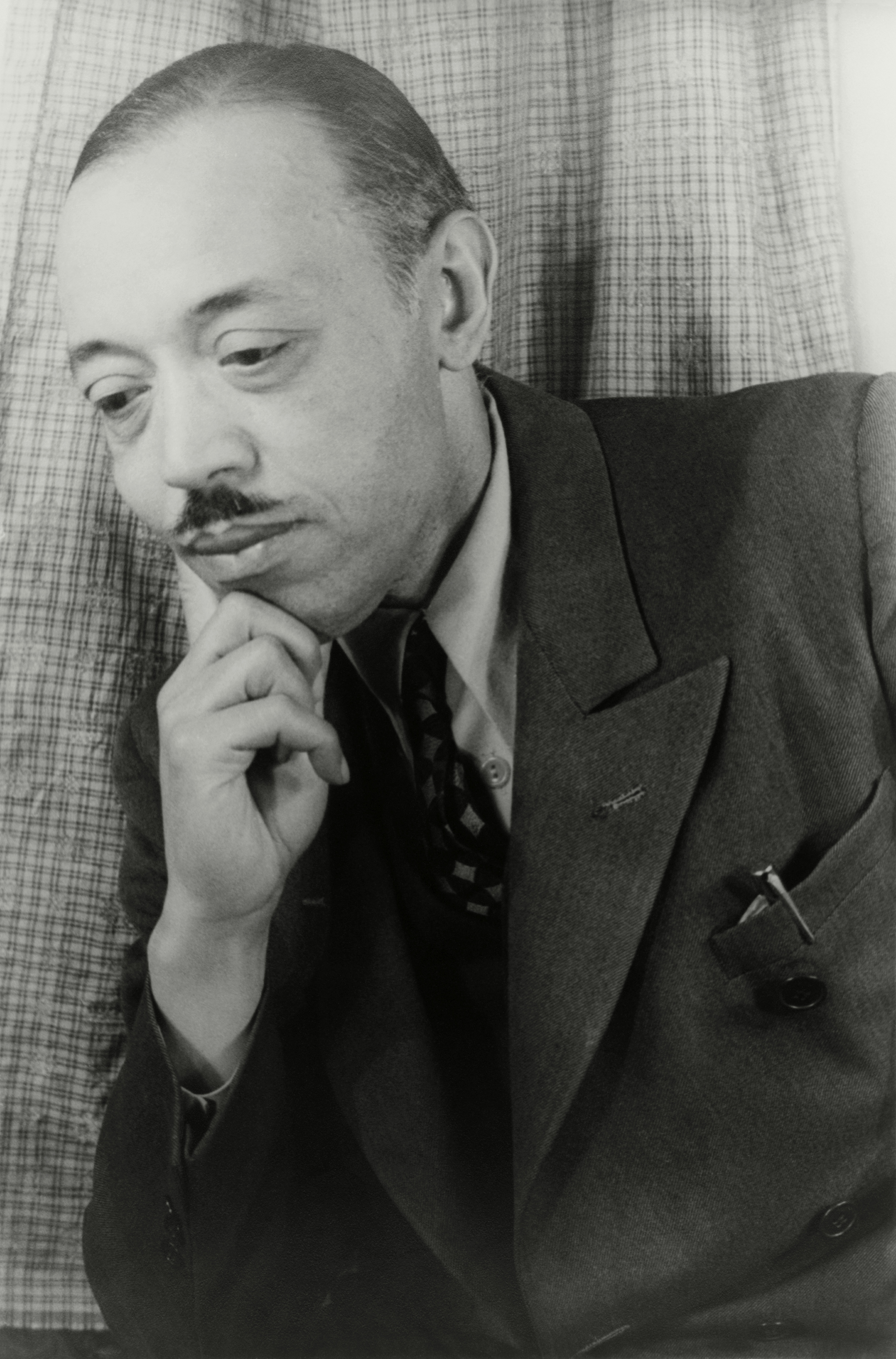
William Grant Still in 1949, photographed by Carl Van Vechten

Darker America is a 1924 symphonic poem by American composer William Grant Still. The composition, exploring themes of sorrow, hope, and prayer, is a work derived from Still's studies with the modernist composer Edgard Varèse. In the work, Still uses "melodic types found in African American music such as the descending melodic curve, the pentatonic scale of the spirituals, and the 'blues scales' of the blues. The primary harmonies used were the tonic, subdominant, and dominant harmony of the spirituals." The work was first performed by Eugene Goossens on November 22, 1926 at the Aeolian Hall in New York City, New York and is about twelve minutes long.

== Overview ==
A description of the symphonic tone poem is as follows:

Darker America, as its title suggests, is representative of the American Negro. His serious side is presented and is intended to suggest the triumph of a people over their sorrows through fervent prayer. At the beginning the theme of the American Negro is announced by the strings in unison. Following a short development of this, the English horn announces the sorrow theme which is followed immediately by the theme of hope, given to muted brass accompanied by strings and woodwind. The sorrow theme returns treated differently, indicative of more intense sorrow as contrasted to passive sorrow indicated at the initial appearance of the theme. Again hope appears and the people seem about to rise above their troubles. But sorrow triumphs. Then the prayer is heard (given to oboe); the prayer of numbed rather than anguished souls. Strongly contrasted moods follow, leading up to the triumph of the people near the end, at which point the three principal themes are combined.

— William Grant Still, University of California Press

== See also ==
- List of jazz-influenced classical compositions
- List of symphonic poems
