= Christopher Moore (preservationist) =

American historian (1952–2022)

Christopher Moore (January 20, 1952 – March 13, 2022) was an American curator, journalist and historian based in New York City who helped save, document and later create what is now known as the African Burial Ground in Lower Manhattan.

He worked as an editor for the National Black Network, and as an actor appeared in As the World Turns and on stage in an Off Broadway production of A Soldier's Play. Moore also served as a member of New York City's Landmarks Preservation Commission. As a historian, he served as research director of the Schomburg Center. Working as an author, he wrote about African-American culture and history including: Fighting For America: Black Soldiers and co-authored Slavery In New York, The Black New Yorkers: 400 Years of African American History and Standing In the Need of Prayer: African American Prayer Traditions. Moore wrote and co-produced The African Burial Ground: An American Discovery for the History Channel as part of his broader research into the city's history with slaves.

Moore died from COVID-19 pneumonia at a hospital in Brooklyn, on March 13, 2022. He was 70.
