= Shock Diamonds (tone poem) =

Shock Diamonds is a tone poem for large orchestra, by American composer Geoffrey Gordon.

Inspired by the visually stunning shock waves (called shock diamonds) in the exhaust plume of an aerospace propulsion system, such as a supersonic jet or rocket engine, Shock Diamonds was commissioned for and premiered by the Boston Modern Orchestra Project, with conductor Gil Rose, on 22 May 2009, Jordan Hall, New England Conservatory of Music, Boston, MA. The work is scored for large orchestra: 3-3-3-3; 4-3-3-1; timpani; three percussion; piano (celesta); harp; strings - with a duration of 13 minutes. Thomas Healy, of Classical Voice New England, called the work, "....endlessly engaging, technically flawless, and a beautifully unique experience ... a wonder to listen to." Erica Adams, of Berkshire Fine Arts, described Shock Diamonds as a "mathematically elegant" work, which "evoked a metallic, faceted light that jettisoned like a sonic comet across the night sky, shattered into debris then, disintegrated into stillness."
