= Les Éolides =

Symphonic poem by César Franck

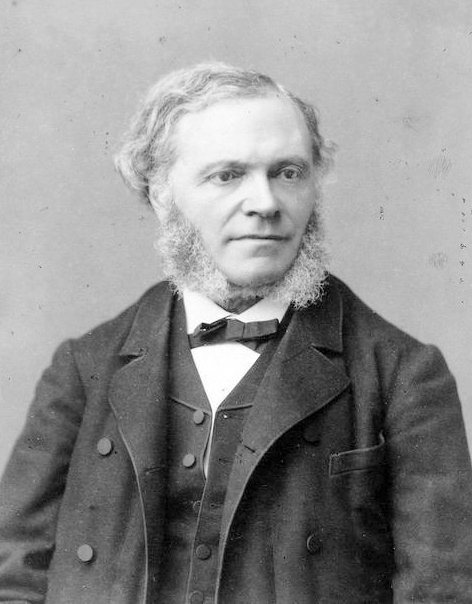
César Franck, photographed by Pierre Petit, 1887

Les Éolides, (Op. 26), FWV 43, CFF 127, is a symphonic poem by French composer César Franck written in 1876 and premiered the next year. Its approximate duration is 11 minutes.

== Background ==
The initial inspiration for the piece came from a poem by Leconte de Lisle about the Aeolids, daughters of the keeper of the winds Aeolus. The work, begun early in 1875, didn't go well until Franck came for summer vacation in Languedoc. He finished the piece in September 1875 and revised it in 1876. The instrumentation was completed on 7 June, but a performance was a difficult task, as at that time the Société Nationale de Musique rarely organised orchestral concerts. The piece was premiered on 13 May 1877 on the 70th concert of the Société in the Salle Érard (Paris). Although he had mauled Franck's oratorio Rédemption some years earlier, Édouard Colonne was appointed to conduct. Les Éolides were well received by the public.

A revival of the piece in February 1882 under Charles Lamoureux's baton might have impelled Franck to compose his next symphonic poem, Le Chasseur maudit, and the orchestral colours of Les Éolides made their way into his last instalment in that genre, Psyché (1888).

== Instrumentation ==
Woodwinds

2 flutes
2 oboes
2 clarinets in A
2 bassoons

Brass

2 horns in E
2 cornets in E
2 trumpets in E

Percussion

timpani
suspended cymbal

Strings

harp

violins
violas
cellos
basses

== Structure ==
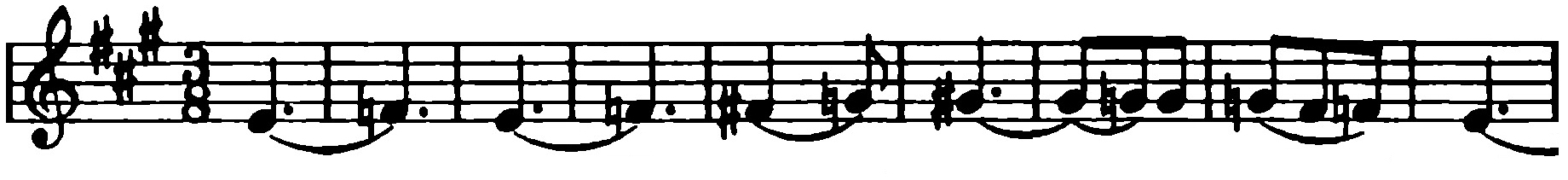
The first (motto) theme

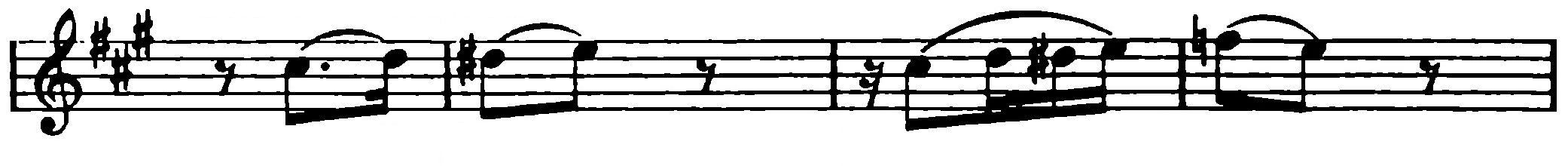
The second (main) theme (a)

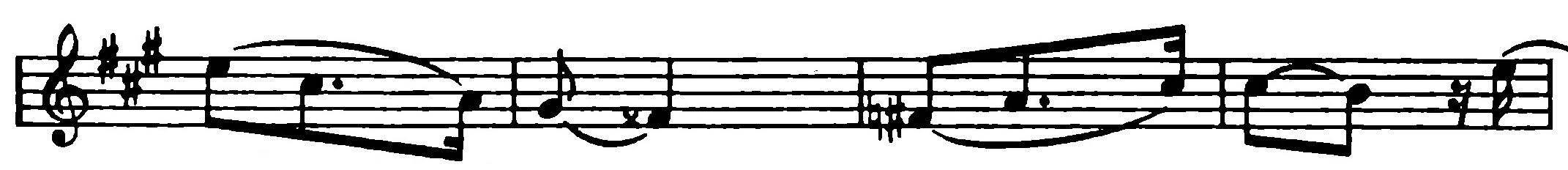
The second (main) theme (b)

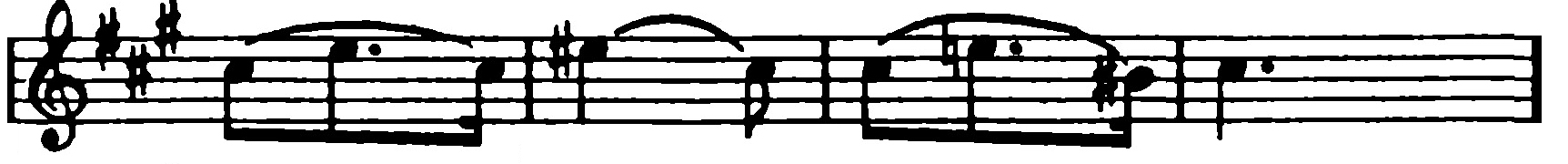
The second (main) theme (c)

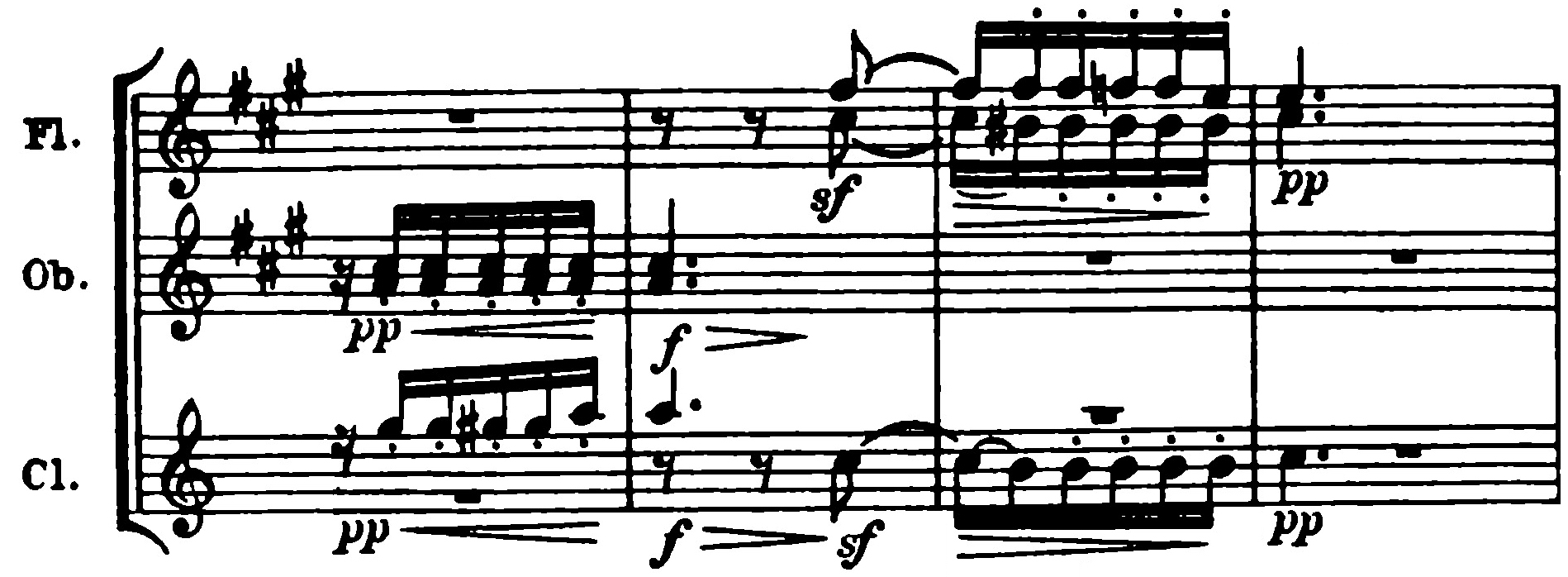
The woodwinds motive

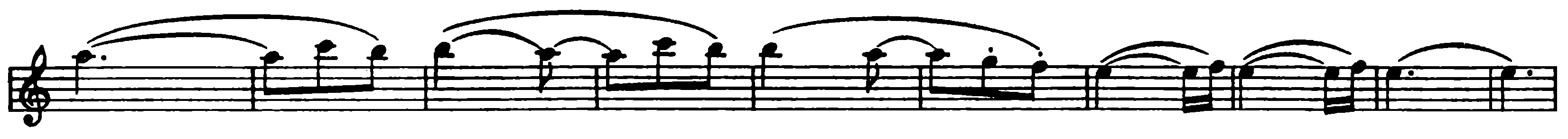
The third theme (clarinet stave, transposed)

Les Éolides is a symphonic poem with a complex structure slightly resembling the sonata form. There are three main themes, two of which are in A major (that is the first subject), while the last is stated in F♯ minor (second subject). A long development section begins with a new statement of the second theme, but it soon gives place for proper thematic development, ending with a slower tempo section based mainly on the third theme (E♭ major). In the recapitulation the A major themes return, and a slower tempo section is heard again, this time in the home key (thus it can be said to be a proper sonata form). After this comes a short coda.

The first theme (Allegretto vivo) gives thematic material for the whole piece. It is a lilting ascending melody played by the strings and then accompanied by the woodwinds. However, one soon realises that it is a motto and serves as just an introduction to the main (second) theme, which is much more joyful and vigorous. This theme consists of three sections: the most important is the first one (ascending; bars 79–90), while the second (descending; 103–110) is just an answer for it and a transition to the third, that is built around the tonic (111–118). Their statement is followed by a characteristic 'windy' motive in the woodwinds, which is used much in later portions of the work, mostly to accompany other melodies, but sometimes independently. The music reaches its summit, and now comes the motto theme again, triumphant, with elegant harp arpeggios supporting its breathings. The woodwinds motive emerges to the foreground, and at last the key changes to Franck's favourite F♯ minor. Upon this the clarinet introduces the sorrowful third theme (171–180).

The same motive accompanies the development section. It begins with the main theme in A major, whose second section is omitted, and the first one is reworked again and again. After a climax the motto theme enters in C major, played by horns and violins. It is rounded by the cornets with the third section of the main theme. The tempo becomes slower (Un poco più lento) to let the violins sing the third theme, now in E♭ major. However, it is constantly disturbed by the scattered elements of the main theme in other voices.

The music modulates to A major, and the main theme rallies its forces (Tempo I) to begin the recapitulation. All the three sections of this theme are heard. The remnants of the woodwinds motive lead to the motto theme, played at first in E♭ and then in A major. It goes directly into another slow tempo section (Un poco più lento), where the third theme is given in the home key. In the coda (Tempo del inizio) the motto and the main theme are heard simultaneously. The woodwinds motive marks a transition to the third theme concluding the piece.

== Recordings ==
- (rel. 1954) Walter Goehr, Netherlands Philharmonic Orchestra — (LP) Concert Hall H-2
- (rec. 1962) André Cluytens, National Orchestra of Belgium — (LP) Columbia SAXF 959; (CD) EMI 5 65153-2
- (rec. 1967?) Jean Fournet, Czech Philharmonic — (LP) Supraphon ST 50800
- (© 1967) Ernest Ansermet, Orchestre de la Suisse Romande — (LP) Decca SXL 6310; (CD) Eloquence (Decca) 480005-2
- (© 1975) Paul Strauss, Orchestre Philharmonique de Liège — (LP) La Voix de son maître (EMI) 2C 069-14009; (CD) Ricercar RIS 009058/059
- (© 1976?) Daniel Barenboim, Orchestre de Paris — Deutsche Grammophon 437244-2
- (rec. 1985) Armin Jordan, Sinfonieorchester Basel — Erato (LP) NUM 75251; (CD) ECD 88167
- (rec. 1992) Kurt Masur, New York Philharmonic — (CD) Teldec 9031-74863-2
- (rec. 1995) Roberto Benzi, Arnhem Philharmonic Orchestra — (CD) Naxos 8.553631
- (rec. 1995) Raymond Leppard, Royal Philharmonic Orchestra — (CD) Tring International PLC TRPG070
- (rec. 2000) Yan Pascal Tortelier, BBC Philharmonic — (CD) Chandos CHAN 9875
