= Christopher Moore (Australian musician) =

Australian viola player

Christopher Moore is an Australian viola player. He is the Principal Viola of the Melbourne Symphony Orchestra and was previously Principal Viola of Australian Chamber Orchestra. Together with Richard Tognetti and Australian Chamber Orchestra Moore was nominated for the 2010 ARIA Award for Best Classical Album for the album Mozart Violin Concertos.

== Discography ==
Richard Tognetti, Christopher Moore & Australian Chamber Orchestra

- Mozart Violin Concertos (2010) - BIS Records
