= Samuel Mayes =

American cellist (1917–1990)

Samuel Houston Mayes (August 11, 1917 – August 24, 1990), was an American cellist.

Mayes was born in St. Louis, Missouri and began studying the cello from the age of four. When he turned 12 he went to Philadelphia where attended Curtis Institute of Music under a direction of Felix Salmond, and later on, joined its Orchestra where he became the principal cellist in 1936. He held that position in 1948 at the Boston Symphony Orchestra till he returned to Philly by 1964. He joined Los Angeles Philharmonic in 1973 abandoning Philadelphia one that way and the two years later became a faculty member at the University of Michigan. He was 79 years of age when he died in Mesa, Arizona.
