= Don Quixote (Strauss) =

Musical Composition by Richard Strauss

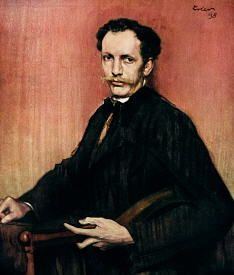
Strauss (1898) by Fritz Erler

Don Quixote, Op. 35 is a tone poem by Richard Strauss for cello, viola, and orchestra. Subtitled Phantastische Variationen über ein Thema ritterlichen Charakters (Fantastic Variations on a Theme of Knightly Character), the work is based on the novel Don Quixote de la Mancha by Miguel de Cervantes. Strauss composed this work in Munich in 1897. The premiere took place in Cologne on 8 March 1898, with Friedrich Grützmacher as the cello soloist and Franz Wüllner as the conductor.

The score is 45 minutes long and is written in theme and variations form, with the solo cello representing Don Quixote, and the solo viola, tenor tuba, and bass clarinet depicting his squire Sancho Panza. The second variation depicts an episode where Don Quixote encounters a herd of sheep and perceives them as an approaching army. Strauss uses dissonant flutter-tonguing in the brass to emulate the bleating of the sheep, an early instance of this extended technique. Strauss later quoted this passage in his music for Le bourgeois gentilhomme, at the moment a servant announces the dish of "leg of mutton in the Italian style". Graham Phipps has examined the structure of the work in terms of Arnold Schoenberg's ideas of 'surface harmonic logic' and 'developing variation'.

== Instrumentation ==
The work is scored for a large orchestra consisting of the following forces: piccolo, 2 flutes, 2 oboes, English horn, 2 clarinets in B♭ (2nd doubling E-flat clarinet), bass clarinet, 3 bassoons, contrabassoon, 6 horns in F, 3 trumpets in D and F, 3 trombones, tenor tuba in B♭ (often performed on euphonium), tuba, timpani, bass drum, snare drum, cymbals, triangle, tambourine, wind machine, and strings: harp, violins i, ii, violas (including an extensive solo viola part), violoncellos (including an extensive solo violoncello part), double basses.

== Structure ==
1. Introduction: Mäßiges Zeitmaß. Thema mäßig. "Don Quichotte verliert über der Lektüre der Ritterromane seinen Verstand und beschließt, selbst fahrender Ritter zu werden" ("Don Quixote loses his sanity after reading novels about knights, and decides to become a knight-errant")
2. Theme: Mäßig. "Don Quichotte, der Ritter von der traurigen Gestalt" ("Don Quixote, knight of the sorrowful countenance")
3. Maggiore: "Sancho Panza"
4. Variation I: Gemächlich. "Abenteuer an den Windmühlen" ("Adventure at the Windmills")
5. Variation II: Kriegerisch. "Der siegreiche Kampf gegen das Heer des großen Kaisers Alifanfaron" ("The victorious struggle against the army of the great emperor Alifanfaron") [actually a flock of sheep]
6. Variation III: Mäßiges Zeitmaß. "Gespräch zwischen Ritter und Knappen" ("Dialogue between Knight and Squire")
7. Variation IV: Etwas breiter. "Unglückliches Abenteuer mit einer Prozession von Büßern" ("Unhappy adventure with a procession of pilgrims")
8. Variation V: Sehr langsam. "Die Waffenwache" ("The knight's vigil")
9. Variation VI: Schnell. "Begegnung mit Dulzinea" ("The Meeting with Dulcinea")
10. Variation VII: Ein wenig ruhiger als vorher. "Der Ritt durch die Luft" ("The Ride through the Air")
11. Variation VIII: Gemächlich. "Die unglückliche Fahrt auf dem venezianischen Nachen" ("The unhappy voyage in the enchanted boat")
12. Variation IX: Schnell und stürmisch. "Kampf gegen vermeintliche Zauberer" ("Battle with the magicians")
13. Variation X: Viel breiter. "Zweikampf mit dem Ritter vom blanken Mond" ("Duel with the knight of the bright moon")
14. Finale: Sehr ruhig. "Wieder zur Besinnung gekommen" ("Coming to his senses again" – Death of Don Quixote)

== In film ==
The first and second variations are featured in the soundtrack of The Lobster, a 2015 film directed by Yorgos Lanthimos.

== Selected recordings ==
- 1932 – Alfred Wallenstein (cello), René Pollain (viola), Thomas Beecham (conductor), New York Philharmonic – Columbia
- 1933 – Enrico Mainardi (cello), Karl Reitz (viola), Richard Strauss (conductor), Staatskapelle Berlin – Decca
- 1938 – Emanuel Feuermann (cello), Carlton Cooley (viola), Arturo Toscanini (conductor), NBC Symphony Orchestra – MJA (Concert: October 22, 1938)
- 1941 – Oswald Uhl (cello), Philipp Haas (viola), Richard Strauss (conductor), Bavarian State Orchestra – Deutsche Grammophon (Strauss conducts Strauss, released in 2014)
- 1941 – Gregor Piatigorsky (cello), Vladimir Bakaleinikov (viola), Fritz Reiner (conductor), Pittsburgh Symphony Orchestra – Columbia
- 1943 – Joseph Schuster (cello), William Lincer (viola), Leonard Bernstein (conductor), New York Philharmonic (CBS Radio broadcast: November 14, 1943. Released in 1983. An Historic Recording Celebrating the 40th Anniversary of Bernstein's New York Philharmonic Debut)
- 1945 – Leonard Rose (cello), William Lincer (viola), George Szell (conductor), New York Philharmonic – Documents (Milestones of a Cello Legend: Leonard Rose, released in 2019)
- 1949 – Paul Tortelier (cello), Leonard Rubens (viola), Thomas Beecham (conductor), Royal Philharmonic Orchestra – His Master's Voice
- 1953 – Frank Miller (cello), Carlton Cooley (viola), Arturo Toscanini (conductor), NBC Symphony Orchestra – RCA (NBC broadcast: November 22, 1953. Released in 1956)
- 1954 – Pierre Fournier (cello), Ernst Morawec (viola), Clemens Krauss (conductor), Vienna Philharmonic – Decca
- 1955 – Gregor Piatigorsky (cello), Joseph de Pasquale (viola), Charles Munch (conductor), Boston Symphony Orchestra – RCA
- 1959 – Samuel Mayes (cello), Joseph de Pasquale (viola), Pierre Monteux (conductor), Boston Symphony Orchestra – West Hill Radio Archives (Concert: January 23, 1959) Pierre Monteux with the Boston Symphony Orchestra, released in 2010
- 1959 – Antonio Janigro (cello), Milton Preves (viola), Fritz Reiner (conductor), Chicago Symphony Orchestra – RCA
- 1959 – Paul Tortelier (cello), Giusto Cappone (viola), Rudolf Kempe (conductor), Berlin Philharmonic – His Master's Voice
- 1961 – Pierre Fournier (cello), Abraham Skernick (viola), George Szell (conductor), Cleveland Orchestra – Epic Records
- 1963 – Lorne Munroe (cello), Carlton Cooley (viola), Eugene Ormandy (conductor), Philadelphia Orchestra – Columbia Masterworks
- 1964 – Mstislav Rostropovich (cello), Lazar Dvoskin (viola), Kirill Kondrashin (conductor), Moscow Philharmonic Orchestra – EMI
- 1966 – Pierre Fournier (cello), Giusto Cappone (viola), Herbert von Karajan (conductor), Berlin Philharmonic – Deutsche Grammophon
- 1968 – Jacqueline du Pré (cello), Herbert Downes (viola), Adrian Boult (conductor), Philharmonia Orchestra – EMI
- 1969 – Emanuel Brabec (cello), Josef Staar (viola), Lorin Maazel (conductor), Vienna Philharmonic – Decca
- 1970 – Lorne Munroe (cello), William Lincer (viola), Leonard Bernstein (conductor), New York Philharmonic – Columbia Masterworks
- 1973 – János Starker (cello), Richard Parnas (viola), Antal Doráti (conductor), National Symphony Orchestra Washington DC, live in New York
- 1974 – Kurt Reher (cello), Jan Hlinka (viola), Zubin Mehta (conductor), Los Angeles Philharmonic – Decca
- 1974 – Paul Tortelier (cello), Max Rostal (viola), Rudolf Kempe (conductor), Staatskapelle Dresden – EMI
- 1975 – Mstislav Rostropovich (cello), Ulrich Koch (viola), Herbert von Karajan (conductor), Berlin Philharmonic – EMI
- 1978 – Tibor de Machula (cello), Klaas Boon (viola), Bernard Haitink (conductor), Royal Concertgebouw Orchestra – Philips
- 1980 – David Geringas (cello), Erich Sichermann (viola), Klaus Tennstedt (conductor), NDR Elbphilharmonie Orchestra – NDR
- 1981 – Miklós Perényi (cello), László Bársony (viola), János Ferencsik (conductor), Hungarian National Philharmonic – Hungaroton
- 1985 – Yo-Yo Ma (cello), Burton Fine (viola), Seiji Ozawa (conductor), Boston Symphony Orchestra – CBS Masterworks
- 1986 – Lynn Harrell (cello), Robert Vernon (viola), Vladimir Ashkenazy (conductor), Cleveland Orchestra – Decca
- 1987 – Antônio Meneses (cello), Wolfram Christ (viola), Herbert von Karajan (conductor), Berlin Philharmonic – Deutsche Grammophon
- 1991 – Heinrich Schiff (cello), Dietmar Hallman (viola), Kurt Masur (conductor), Leipzig Gewandhaus Orchestra – Philips
- 1991 – János Starker (cello), Oscar Lysy (viola), Leonard Slatkin (conductor), Bavarian Radio Symphony Orchestra – RCA
- 1991 – Franz Bartolomey (cello), Heinrich Koll (viola), André Previn (conductor), Vienna Philharmonic – Telarc
- 1991 – John Sharp (cello), Charles Pikler (viola), Daniel Barenboim (conductor), Chicago Symphony Orchestra – Erato
- 1992 – Steven Isserlis (cello), Cynthia Phelps (viola), Edo de Waart (conductor), Minnesota Orchestra – Virgin Classics
- 2001 – Steven Isserlis (cello), Hermann Menninghaus (viola), Lorin Maazel (conductor), Bavarian Radio Symphony Orchestra – RCA
- 2003 – Thomas Grossenbacher (cello), Michel Rouilly (viola), David Zinman (conductor), Tonhalle-Orchester Zürich – Arte Nova
- 2003 – Mischa Maisky (cello), Tabea Zimmermann (viola), Zubin Mehta (conductor), Berlin Philharmonic – Deutsche Grammophon
- 2004 – Jan Vogler (cello), Sebastian Herberg (viola), Fabio Luisi (conductor), Staatskapelle Dresden – Sony
- 2013 – Alban Gerhardt (cello), Lawrence Power (viola), Markus Stenz (conductor), Gürzenich Orchestra Cologne – Hyperion
- 2019 – Daniel Müller-Schott (cello), Christopher Moore (viola), Andrew Davis (conductor), Melbourne Symphony Orchestra – ABC Classics
- 2019 – Kian Soltani (cello), Miriam Manasherov (viola), Daniel Barenboim (conductor), West–Eastern Divan Orchestra – Peral Music
- 2019 – Louisa Tuck (cello), Catherine Bullock (viola), Vasily Petrenko (conductor), Oslo Philharmonic – LAWO
- 2021 – Jean-Guihen Queyras (cello), Tabea Zimmermann (viola), François-Xavier Roth (conductor), Gürzenich Orchestra Cologne – Harmonia Mundi
