= Karl Tausig =

Polish pianist, arranger and composer (1841–1871)

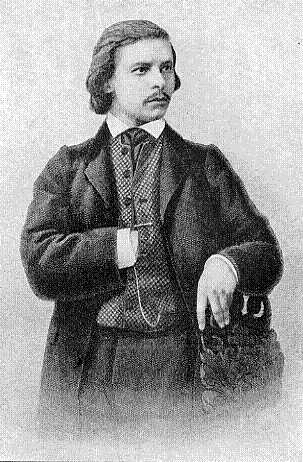
- Karl Tausig
- Born: 4 November 1841; Warsaw, Poland
- Died: 17 July 1871 (aged 29); Leipzig, German Empire
- Resting place: Friedhof III der Jerusalems- und Neuen Kirchgemeinde, Berlin-Kreuzberg, Germany
- Other name: Carl Tausig
- Citizenship: Poland
- Occupations: Pianist; composer
- Years active: 1858-1871
- Era: Romantic
- Known for: Prominent pupil of Franz Liszt, virtuosic piano technique; Wagner transcriptions Students: Rafael Joseffy, Alexander Michalowski, Andrey Schulz-Evler Sophie Menter, Vera Timanoff, Amy Fay, Gustav V. Lewinsky
- Notable work: Deux Études de concert; Das Geisterschiff; Wagner transcriptions
- Movement: New Weimar School ("Music of the Future")
- Spouse: Seraphine von Vrabely (m. 1864)
- Father: Aloys Tausig (1820-1885)

Karl Tausig (sometimes "Carl"; born Karol Tausig; 4 November 1841 – 17 July 1871) was a Polish virtuoso pianist, arranger, and composer. He is widely regarded as Franz Liszt's greatest pupil and one of the greatest pianists of all time. Today, he is mostly remembered for transcriptions for piano, in particular of works by J.S. Bach, as well as his piano exercises.

== Life ==
Tausig was born in Warsaw to Jewish parents and received his first piano lessons from his father, pianist and composer Aloys Tausig (1820–1885), a student of Sigismond Thalberg. His father introduced him to Franz Liszt in Weimar, where he studied under Liszt for four years. He quickly became one of Liszt's favorite pupils, traveling with him on concert tours and studying counterpoint, composition, and orchestration in addition to his piano lessons. He even took on one of Liszt's students, Regina Watson, as his own pupil. At the age of 16, he met Richard Wagner, of whom he became a devoted follower and friend. He made piano arrangements of many of Wagner's operas. He also introduced Wagner to his friend Peter Cornelius, another Wagner devotee. While he also became a great admirer and friend of the conservative Beethoven follower Johannes Brahms, Tausig became one of the stanchest champions of the "music of the future" and the New Weimar School founded by Liszt. He single-handedly raised the money to build the Bayreuth Theater for performances of Wagner's operas.

In 1858, Tausig made his debut in Berlin at a concert conducted by Hans von Bülow. While some critics admired his technical feats at the keyboard, others found his playing noisy and overbearing. Even some who were more accommodating of Tausig's "Lisztian eccentricities" felt he would play better as he matured. Tausig toured through various German towns in 1859–60, making Dresden his base. He moved to Vienna in 1862; there he gave concerts of modern orchestral music, including some of his own symphonic poems. These concerts were only partially successful artistically and a failure financially.

After staying out of public view for a few years, in 1864 he married pianist Seraphine von Vrabely (1841–1931), but divorced her soon after. The following year he had settled in Berlin and resumed concertizing. In 1866 with two others he opened a school for virtuoso pianists "Schule des Höheren Klavierspiels", known as the "Virtuosenakademie", teaching there and occasionally giving recitals. Some of his students were Rafael Joseffy, Alexander Michalowski, Andrey Schulz-Evler, Sophie Menter, Vera Timanoff, Amy Fay, and Gustav V. Lewinsky. Eventually, Tausig's busy tour schedule of concerts and recitals took up most of his time away from the school, and the school closed in October 1870.

He made several concert tours in Germany and Russia, and throughout Europe, and was now considered a pianist of breadth and dignity of style. However, the strain of travelling weakened his health. In June 1871 toward the end of his life, too weak to concertize, he was cared for by his longtime friend, Marie von Mouchanoff-Kalergis, a pianist who in her youth had been a pupil of Chopin, and to whom Tausig had dedicated his first composition, an Impromptu. He died in Leipzig in July from typhoid at the age of 29.

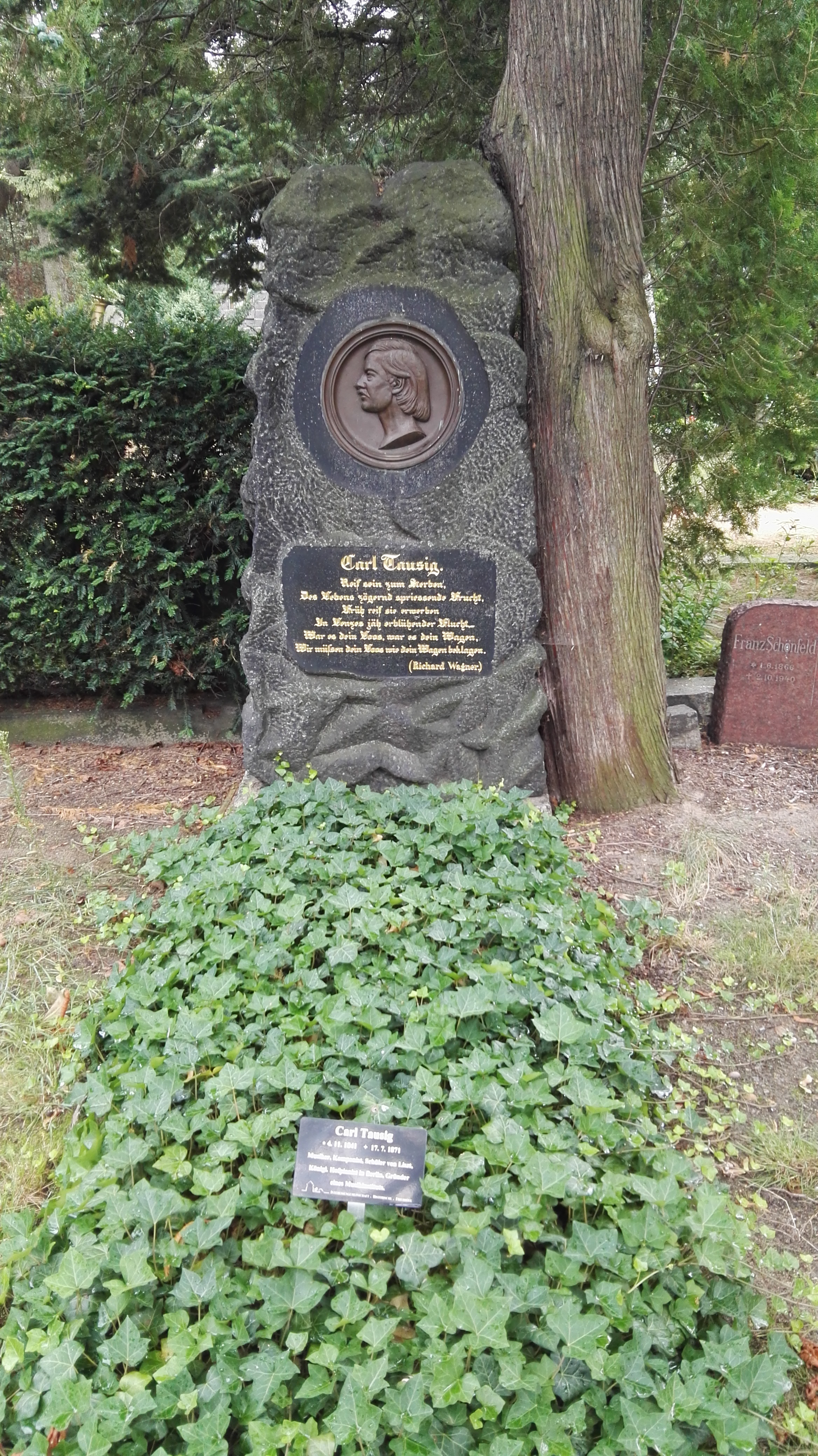
Tausig's grave in Berlin

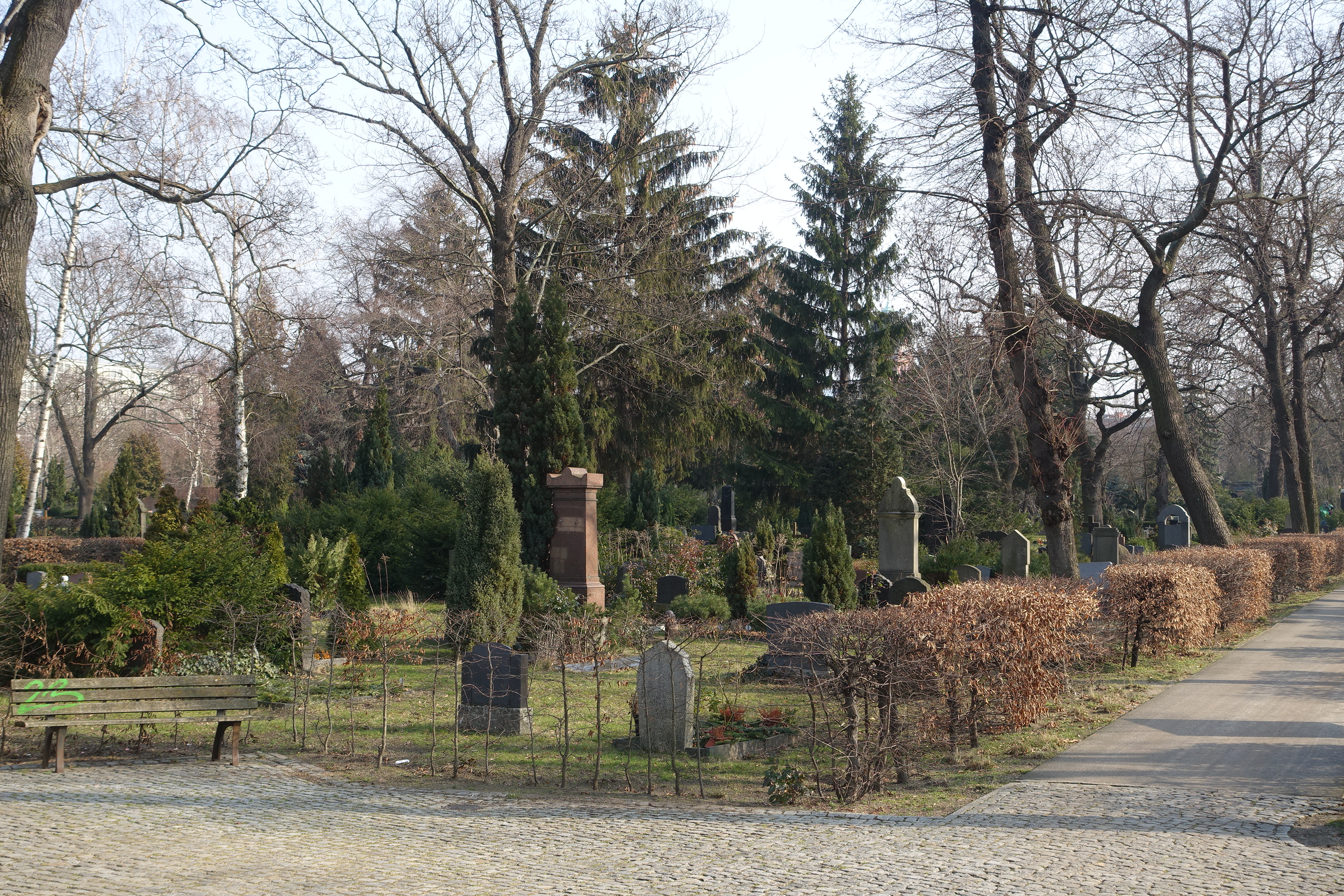
Friedhof III (Jerusalems- und Neuen Kirche) (Berlin-Kreuzberg), Tausig's resting place south of the Hallesches Tor

His grave is preserved in the Protestant Friedhof III der Jerusalems- und Neuen Kirchengemeinde (Cemetery No. III of the congregations of Jerusalem's Church and New Church) in Berlin-Kreuzberg, south of Hallesches Tor. Wagner wrote the epitaph inscribed on Tausig's tombstone.

== Pianism ==
Tausig was considered by some critics to be the greatest of Liszt's pupils and to carry pure piano virtuosity to heights only suggested by Liszt. The master said he had "fingers of steel". Anton Rubinstein called him "the infallible." Where Tausig differed from his teacher was in his lack of flamboyant gestures while playing. Tausig sat motionless at the piano and abhorred what he called Spektakel. While his fingers were working miracles at the keyboard without any digital errors, the only sign of tension from Tausig would be a slight tightening of one corner of his mouth.

Until his early death, some critics surmise that Tausig may not have had a pianistic equal, combining Liszt's force and range of tone color with the intellectuality of his fellow pupil Hans von Bülow. Another Liszt pupil, Eugen d'Albert, compared Tausig very favorably with their teacher. He said that while Liszt's musical conceptions were grander, Tausig possessed a better and more accurate technique coupled with a good deal of poetry.

== Repertory ==
Tausig's repertory was extensive; he could play from memory works ranging from Scarlatti to Liszt. He was especially noted for his interpretations of Chopin, Weber and Beethoven, both for pianistic finish and intensity of emotion.

== Works ==
As well as entirely original works, Tausig arranged for piano the music of a number of composers, as well as a pedagogic work for teaching and practice.

In the following list, lost works are included, mostly original compositions, but a few transcriptions as well. Many of these, including several orchestral works, were given their first public performances by Tausig at the piano or conducting. With the exception of Das Geisterschiff, the orchestral scores have not been located since. All of these are unpublished, except for a couple compositions where no printed copies can be found and the original engravings were destroyed.

Some compositions are unfinished in existing manuscripts, left incomplete by Tausig for reasons unknown, most particularly a number of the transcriptions of Liszt's symphonic poems. Where possible, details of the state of the manuscript are given.

All works listed are for piano solo unless indicated otherwise.

Works marked by * have been recorded.

=== Original compositions ===
==== Early works ====
- Impromptu, in F minor, Op. 1 [1a] (dedicated to Marie von Mouchanoff-Kalergis) (1855)*
- Introduction and Tarantella, in A minor, Op. 2 [2a] (1855)*
- L'Éspérance (Hope), Nocturne varié, in A♭ major, Op. 3 [3a] (1856)*
- Sérénade, Op. 4 [publication lost] (1856)
- Rêverie, Fantasie, in A major, Op. 5 (1856)*
- Le Ruisseau (The Brook), Etude, in A major, Op. 6 (c1856)*

==== Mature works ====
- Das Geisterschiff, Ballade (piano version) (The Ghost Ship), in A minor/D major, Op. 1 [1b] (1860)*
- Réminiscences de Halka, Op. 2 [2b] (1860) [see Paraphrases section]*
- Hernani-Galop, Op. 3 [3b] [lost] (c1860)
- Das Geisterschiff, Symphonische Ballade, for orchestra (The Ghost Ship, Symphonic Ballad based on a poem by Strachwitz) [unpublished] (c1862-63)
- Manfred, symphonic poem for orchestra (after Byron) [lost] (c1862-63)
- Der Triumph der Liebe, symphonic poem for orchestra with chorus and soloists on text by Schiller [only 1 page found, remainder lost] (c1862-63)
- Der Triumph der Liebe (piano version) [only 1 page found, remainder lost] (c1862-63)
- One or more other symphonic poems for orchestra [all lost] (c1862-63)
- Fantaisie in polonaise style, for piano and orchestra, (sometimes erroneously called a Concerto or a Polonaise) [lost] (c1862-63)
- Five Nouvelles soirées de Vienne (1862-63) [see Paraphrases section]*
- Ungarische Zigeunerweisen (Hungarian Gypsy Airs) (Fantasia on Hungarian-Gypsy Themes), in B minor/major (written for and dedicated to his Hungarian pianist wife Seraphine von Vrabely) (1864)*
- Tägliche Studien für Pianoforte von Tausig (Tausig's Daily Exercises for Piano) (c1864-70?) [published 1873] [American revised edition with additional exercises by Heinrich Ehrlich published 1880]:
  - Vol. 1:
    - Exercises with motionless hands. (#1–26)
    - Exercises with the hands in progressive motion. Turning the fingers over and under. (#27–51)
  - Vol. 2:
    - Studies in Chords. (#52–68)
    - Stretching exercises. (#69–76)
    - Wide Jumps. (#77–84)
    - Double-Notes. (#85–100)
    - Scales in thirds in all major and minor keys. Chromatic scales with double-notes. (#101–102)
    - Six Exercise Pieces. [called Ten Préludes in the American revised edition, the last four written by "H. Ehrlich"]*:
      - No. 103: Moderato in E♭ minor
      - No. 104: Allegro in E♭ major
      - No. 105: Allegro moderato in C minor
      - No. 106: Allegro in A major
      - No. 107: Andante in F♯ major
      - No. 108: Moderato in D♭ major
    - Octave-exercise. (#109)

==== Late works ====
- Deux Études de concert (Two Concert Etudes), Op.1 [1c] [published 1871] (c1870-71)*:
1. Presto appassionato in F♯ major
2. Moderato in A♭ major

=== Paraphrases, fantasies, elaborations ===
- Berlioz: Gnomenchor und Sylphentanz, aus Fausts Verdammung (from the Damnation of Faust, Op. 24)
- Brahms: Variations on a Theme of Paganini (Op. 35), manuscript sketches elaborated on (given a more virtuosic flavor) by Tausig and returned to Brahms for completion (c1862-63)
- Chopin: Étude (Op. 10 No. 2) [reconstructed] (c1862-63)
- Chopin: Étude (Op. 25 No. 2), transcription in double notes (sixths and thirds in the right hand) [lost?] (c1862-63)
- Clementi: Gradus ad Parnassum (Op. 44), selection of studies "revised" by Tausig
- Moniuszko: Réminiscences de Halka, de St. Moniuszko. Fantaisie de concert, (Fantasie Halka. Oper von Moniuszko) (Concert Fantasy (Fantasia) on Themes from the Opera 'Halka' by Moniusko), Op. 2 [2b] (1860)*
- Schumann: Der Kontrabandiste (The Smuggler), from Spanisches Liederspiel (Op. 74 No. 10), "transcribed for concert performance"*
- Strauss: Nouvelles soirées de Vienne: Valses-Caprices d'après J. Strauss (Valses Caprices on Themes of Johann Strauss Jr.) (Waltz-Caprices Nos. 1–3 [First Suite]) (dedicated to Liszt) (1862)*:
1. Nachtfalter (Moth Waltzes, Op. 157)
2. Man lebt nur einmal (You Live Only Once!, Waltzes, Op. 167)
3. Wahlstimmen (Election Waltzes, Op. 250)
- Strauss: Nouvelles soirées de Vienne: Valses-Caprices d'après J. Strauss (Valses Caprices on Themes of Johann Strauss Jr.) (Waltz-Caprices Nos. 4 and 5 [Second Suite, posth.]) (1862-63)*:
4. Immer heiterer (Always Cheerful Waltzes, Op. 235)
5. Wiener Chronik, in A major (Vienna Chronicle Waltzes, Op. 268)
- Wagner: Vorspiel (Prelude) to Die Meistersinger von Nürnberg, for solo piano*
- Wagner: Vorspiel (Prelude) to Die Meistersinger von Nürnberg, for piano four-hands
- Wagner: Meditation, Einleitung zum dritten akt (Introduction to the 3rd act) of Die Meistersinger von Nürnberg*
- Wagner: Two "Free Transcriptions" from Die Walküre (1863)*:

Siegmunds Liebesgesang (Siegmund's Love Song)
Der Ritt der Walküren (The Ride of the Valkyries)

- Wagner: Der Ritt der Walküren von Richard Wagner, for piano four-hands*
- Wagner: Tristan und Isolde, Drei Paraphrasen (3 Paraphrases on Wagner's opera) (c1865)*:
1. Liebesscene - Verklärung (Love Scene & Transfiguration)
2. Brangänens Gesang - Matrosenlied (Brangäne's Song & Sailors Shanty)
3. Melodie des Hirten (The Sheep Herders Melody)
- Wagner: Kaiser-Marsch (WWV 104) (1871)*
- Weber: Aufforderung zum Tanz, Mit Arabesken für den Concertvortrag (Invitation to the Dance, Op. 65), "with arabesques for concert performance", concert arrangement for piano*

=== Transcriptions, adaptations, piano scores, editions ===
- Bach: Toccata und Fuge in D minor (BWV 565), transcription for piano ("concert arrangement") (c1862-63)*
- Bach: Sechs Choralvorspiele für Orgel (6 Chorale Preludes), transcriptions for piano (dedicated to Brahms) (c1862-63):
1. Wir glauben all' an einen Gott, Schöpfer (BWV 680)*
2. Das alte Jahr vergangen ist (BWV 614)*
3. O Mensch, bewein' dein' Sünde gross (BWV 622)*
4. O Lamm Gottes, unschuldig (BWV 656)*
5. Vater unser im Himmelreich (BWV 737)
6. Meine Seele erhebt den Herren (BWV 648)
- Bach: Praeludium, Fuge und Allegro in E♭ major (BWV 998), transcription for piano (c1866)
- Bach: 22 Präludien und Fugen aus Das wohltemperirte Clavier (22 Preludes and Fugues from The Well Tempered Clavier), edited and fingering by Tausig:

Bach's Nos. 1, 2, 5, 21, 25, 16, 30, 10, 11, 15, 6, 12, 3, 35, 36, 48, 34, 4, 8, 22, 28, 42

- Beethoven: Sechs Sätze aus Streichquartetten (6 Pieces from String Quartets), transcriptions for piano:
1. Adagio (Op. 59 No. 1, 3rd mvt)*
2. Scherzo (Op. 59 No. 2, 3rd mvt)*
3. Andante (Op. 59 No. 3, 2nd mvt)*
4. Kavatine (Cavatina) (Op. 130, 5th mvt)*
5. Presto (Op. 131, 5th mvt)
6. Scherzo (Op. 135, 2nd mvt)
- Beethoven: Missa solemnis (Op. 123), piano reduction [reconstructed]
- Beethoven: Sechs Minuetten (WoO 10), arranged from Beethoven's unpublished orchestral manuscript (since lost)
- Beethoven: Piano Concerto No. 4 (Op. 58), transcription for piano solo, and edited and fingering by Tausig
- Chopin: Piano Concerto No. 1 in E minor (Op. 11), transcription for solo piano (c1865?)*
- Chopin: Piano Concerto No. 2 in F minor (Op. 21), 2nd movement, transcription for solo piano [reconstructed]
- Clementi: Gradus ad Parnassum (Op. 44), edited and fingering by Tausig [see also selections in Paraphrase section]
- Lassen: Albumleaf [incomplete]
- Liszt: Faust-Symphonie [2nd movement 'Gretchen' incomplete, remainder mostly complete; reconstructed]
- Liszt: Dante-Symphonie [unpublished]
- Liszt: 12 Symphonic Poems, transcriptions for piano (1855-71):
1. Ce qu'on entend sur la montagne [unpublished]
2. Tasso [essentially complete, only last 4 bars not finished, ms in Library of Congress; ending reconstructed]*
3. Les préludes [published by Editio Musica Budapest]*
4. Orpheus [no phrasing, dynamics or tempo markings; unpublished]*
5. Prometheus [reconstructed]
6. Mazeppa [lost, possibly never written]
7. Festklänge [unfinished; 3/4 reconstructed]
8. Heroïde funèbre [no phrasing, dynamics or tempo markings; unpublished]
9. Hungaria [last 13 bars incomplete; unpublished]
10. Hamlet [unpublished]*
11. Hunnenschlacht [reconstructed]
12. Die Ideale [last 25 bars incomplete; unpublished]
- Scarlatti: Five Sonatas, "concert arrangements" for piano from the original harpsichord pieces:
1. Pastorale (in E minor K. 9), transposed to D minor*
2. Capriccio (in E major K. 20)*
3. (in G minor K. 12)*
4. (in G minor K. 426)
5. (in F minor K. 519)*
- Scarlatti: Keyboard Sonata in C major (K. 487)*
- Schubert: Four Concert Arrangements, transcriptions for solo piano:
  - Andantino und Variationen (Andantino and Variations) (Op. 84 No. 1)*
  - Rondo, über französische Motive (Rondo, on a French Theme) (Op. 84 No. 2)*
  - Polonaise mélancolique d'après F. Schubert (Op. 75 No. 3)*
  - Militär-Marsch (Military March) No. 1 in D (Op. 51 No. 1)*
- Wagner: Die Meistersinger von Nürnberg, piano reduction of complete orchestral score, with vocal score [see also selections in Paraphrase section]

=== Wrongly attributed works ===
- "Morgenblätter", Walzer von J. Strauss Op. 279 – Paraphrasiert für den Concert Vortrag von Karl Tausig – Oeuvre Posthume [published c1878; actually composed by American pianist Julie Rivé-King (1854-1937)]
- "Kiss Waltz", Walzer von J. Strauss [recorded by both Mark Hambourg and Benno Moiseiwitsch; actually composed by Russian composer and pianist Eduard Schütt (1856-1933) as "Concert Paraphrases on J. Strauss' Waltz Motives"]
- Préludes nos. 7-10 from the 1880 American revised edition of Tausig's Daily Exercises, which edition added more exercises by Heinrich Ehrlich. Of the "10 Preludes" presented, the last four are actually by Ehrlich. Tausig wrote only the first six, which he called "6 Exercise Pieces", not "Preludes", though they are often still called Preludes. [see Mature Works section]

== Recordings ==
Concert Études for Piano, Op. 1 – moderato
Performed by Setrak Setrakian

Michael Ponti was the first to record an all-Tausig album, in 1976 on the Candide LP label. It contained the Two Concert Etudes, The Ghost Ship, Hope, One Lives Only Once (Caprice Waltz #2), Hungarian Gypsy Airs, Caprice Waltz #4, and the Halka Fantasy. Ponti later recorded 3 of Tausig's Wagner arrangements: the 2 from Valkyre, and Brangäneus' Song from Tristan. Another album of all Tausig newly recorded in 1980 and released on the Wifon label (available on cassette) contained all the pieces that were on the earlier Candide album except for the two Caprice Waltzes, but also added the Reverie op. 5.

Beginning in 1989, Dennis Hennig released three all-Tausig albums for the Etcetera label. All five of the Valse-Caprices and three of the Schubert transcriptions (omitting the Andantino Variations). An album of some of Tausig's Wagner transcriptions: the 3 Tristan paraphrases, the 2 from Valkyre, including the four-hand version of Ride of the Valkyres, and the Kaiser March. Four of Tausig's transcriptions of Liszt symphonic poems: no. 3 Les Preludes, and nos. 2, 4, and 10 all previously unpublished.

Orazio Sciortino made an album of Wagner transcriptions as well in 2013: the 3 Tristan, 2 Valkyre, and the 2 Meistersinger arrangements.

Artur Cimirro recorded Tausig's complete extant original piano works for the Acte Préalable CD label in 2016. The pianist had intentions of recording all the extant transcriptions and arrangements, as well as conducting the premiere of the orchestral version of The Ghost Ship, but these recordings have not materialized.

Many other modern-day pianists have recorded Tausig compositions, such as Rian de Waal, Carlo Lombardi, Giulio Draghi, Stephen Hough, and Menachem Har-Zahav. There are several recordings of Tausig's piano music on YouTube. Setrak Setrakian has recorded the rare Chopin E minor concerto transcription.

Historically, Tausig's arrangement of Strauss's waltz You Only Live Once! was recorded by Sergei Rachmaninov and Ignacy Jan Paderewski. Rachmaninov also made recordings of Tausig's transcription of Schumann's Der Kontrabandiste (also recorded by Josef Lhévinne, Josef Hofmann, Emil Gilels, and many others) and Tausig's Pastorale in E minor, adaptated from Scarlatti's harpsichord Sonata, L. 413, the latter also being popular with several other pianists of that era, including Vladimir Horowitz. The Bach Toccata and Fugue in D minor adaptation and the Schubert/Tausig Marche Militaire were also quite popular in recordings, the latter being recorded by Eugen d'Albert, Leopold Godowsky, Mischa Levitzki, Lhévinne, Ignaz Friedman, Egon Petri, Wilhelm Backhaus, Alexander Brailowsky, Horowitz, and György Cziffra. Most of those pianists recorded other Tausig works as well, such as Lhévinne's rare recording of the Hungarian Gypsy Dances. Benno Moiseiwitsch recorded Tausig's piano arrangement of Weber's orchestral Invitation to the Dance. Winifred Christie even recorded the Bach Toccata and Fugue in D minor adaptation on her husband's invention, the Moór-Duplex piano.
