= Symphonic poems (Liszt) =

Group of 13 orchestral works

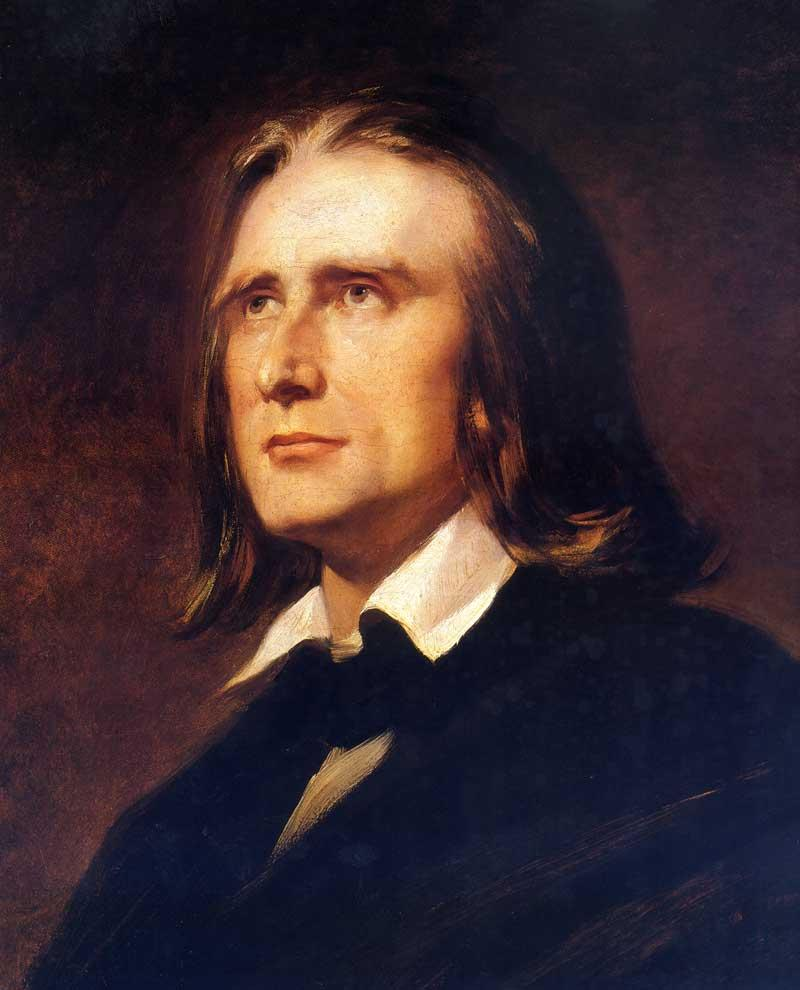
Franz Liszt

The symphonic poems of the Hungarian composer Franz Liszt are a series of 13 orchestral works, numbered S.95–107. The first 12 were composed between 1848 and 1858 (though some use material conceived earlier); the last, Von der Wiege bis zum Grabe (From the Cradle to the Grave), followed in 1882. These works helped establish the genre of orchestral program music—compositions written to illustrate an extra-musical plan derived from a play, poem, painting or work of nature. They inspired the symphonic poems of Bedřich Smetana, Antonín Dvořák, Richard Strauss and others.

Liszt's intent, according to musicologist Hugh MacDonald, was for these single-movement works "to display the traditional logic of symphonic thought." In other words, Liszt wanted these works to display a complexity in their interplay of themes similar to that usually reserved for the opening movement of the Classical symphony; this principal self-contained section was normally considered the most important in the larger whole of the symphony in terms of academic achievement and musical architecture. At the same time, Liszt wanted to incorporate the abilities of program music to inspire listeners to imagine scenes, images, or moods. To capture these dramatic and evocative qualities while achieving the scale of an opening movement, he combined elements of overture and symphony in a modified sonata design. The composition of the symphonic poems proved daunting. They underwent a continual process of creative experimentation that included many stages of composition, rehearsal and revision to reach a balance of musical form.

Aware that the public appreciated instrumental music with context, Liszt provided written prefaces for nine of his symphonic poems. However, Liszt's view of the symphonic poem tended to be evocative, using music to create a general mood or atmosphere rather than to illustrate a narrative or describe something literally. In this regard, Liszt authority Humphrey Searle suggests that he may have been closer to his contemporary Hector Berlioz than to many who would follow him in writing symphonic poems.

== Background ==
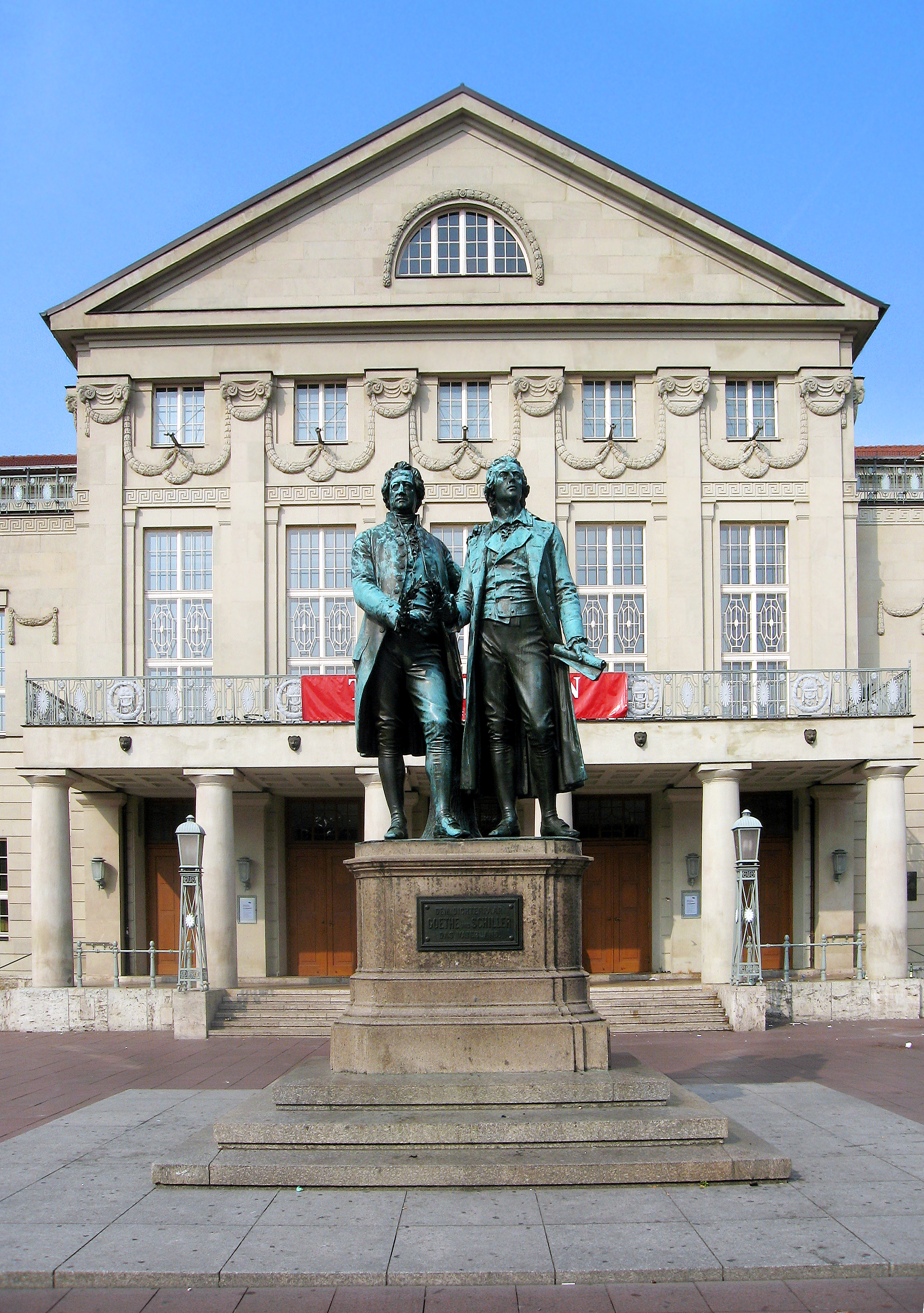
Goethe and Schiller in front of the Deutsches Nationaltheater and Staatskapelle Weimar, where many of Liszt's symphonic poems premiered.

According to cultural historian Hannu Salmi, classical music began to gain public prominence in Western Europe in the latter 18th century through the establishment of concerts by musical societies in cities such as Leipzig and the subsequent press coverage of these events. This was a consequence of the Industrial Revolution, according to music critic and historian Harold C. Schonberg, which brought changes to the early 19th-century lifestyles of the working masses. The lower and middle classes began to take an interest in the arts, which previously had been enjoyed mostly by the clergy and aristocracy. In the 1830s, concert halls were few, and orchestras served mainly in the production of operas—symphonic works were considered far lower in importance. However, the European music scene underwent a transformation in the 1840s. As the role of religion diminished, Salmi asserts, 19th-century culture remained a religious one and the attendance of the arts in historical or similarly impressive surroundings "may still have generated a rapture akin to experiencing the sacred." Schonberg, cultural historian Peter Cay and musicologist Alan Walker add that, while aristocrats still held private musical events, public concerts grew as institutions for the middle class, which was growing prosperous and could now afford to attend. As interest burgeoned, these concerts were performed at a rapidly increasing number of venues. Programs often ran over three hours, "even if the content was thin: two or more symphonies, two overtures, vocal and instrumental numbers, duets, a concerto." Roughly half of the presented music was vocal in nature. Symphonies by Wolfgang Amadeus Mozart, Joseph Haydn or Ludwig van Beethoven usually opened or concluded concerts, and "while these works were revered as models of great music, they were ultimately less popular than the arias and scenes from operas and oratorios that stood prominently in the middle of these concerts."

Meanwhile, the future of the symphony genre was coming into doubt. Musicologist Mark Evan Bonds writes, "Even symphonies by [such] well-known composers of the early 19th century as Méhul, Rossini, Cherubini, Hérold, Czerny, Clementi, Weber and Moscheles were perceived in their own time as standing in the symphonic shadow of Haydn, Mozart, Beethoven, or some combination of the three." While many composers continued to write symphonies during the 1820s and 30s, "there was a growing sense that these works were aesthetically far inferior to Beethoven's.... The real question was not so much whether symphonies could still be written, but whether the genre could continue to flourish and grow as it had over the previous half-century in the hands of Haydn, Mozart and Beethoven. On this count, there were varying degrees of skepticism but virtually no real optimism."

The crux of the issue, Bonds asserts, "was never really one of style ... but rather of generic conception." Between his Third and Seventh Symphonies, Beethoven had pushed the symphony well beyond the boundaries of entertainment into those of moral, political and philosophical statement. By adding text and voices in his Ninth Symphony, he not only redefined the genre but also called into question whether instrumental music could truly be superior to vocal music. The Ninth, Bonds says, in fact became the catalyst that fueled debate about the symphony genre. Hector Berlioz was the only composer "able to grapple successfully with Beethoven's legacy." However, Felix Mendelssohn, Robert Schumann and Niels Gade also achieved successes with their symphonies, putting at least a temporary stop to the debate as to whether the genre was dead. Regardless, composers increasingly turned to the "more compact form" of the concert overture "as a vehicle within which to blend musical, narrative and pictoral ideas"; examples included Mendelssohn's overtures A Midsummer Night's Dream (1826) and The Hebrides (1830).

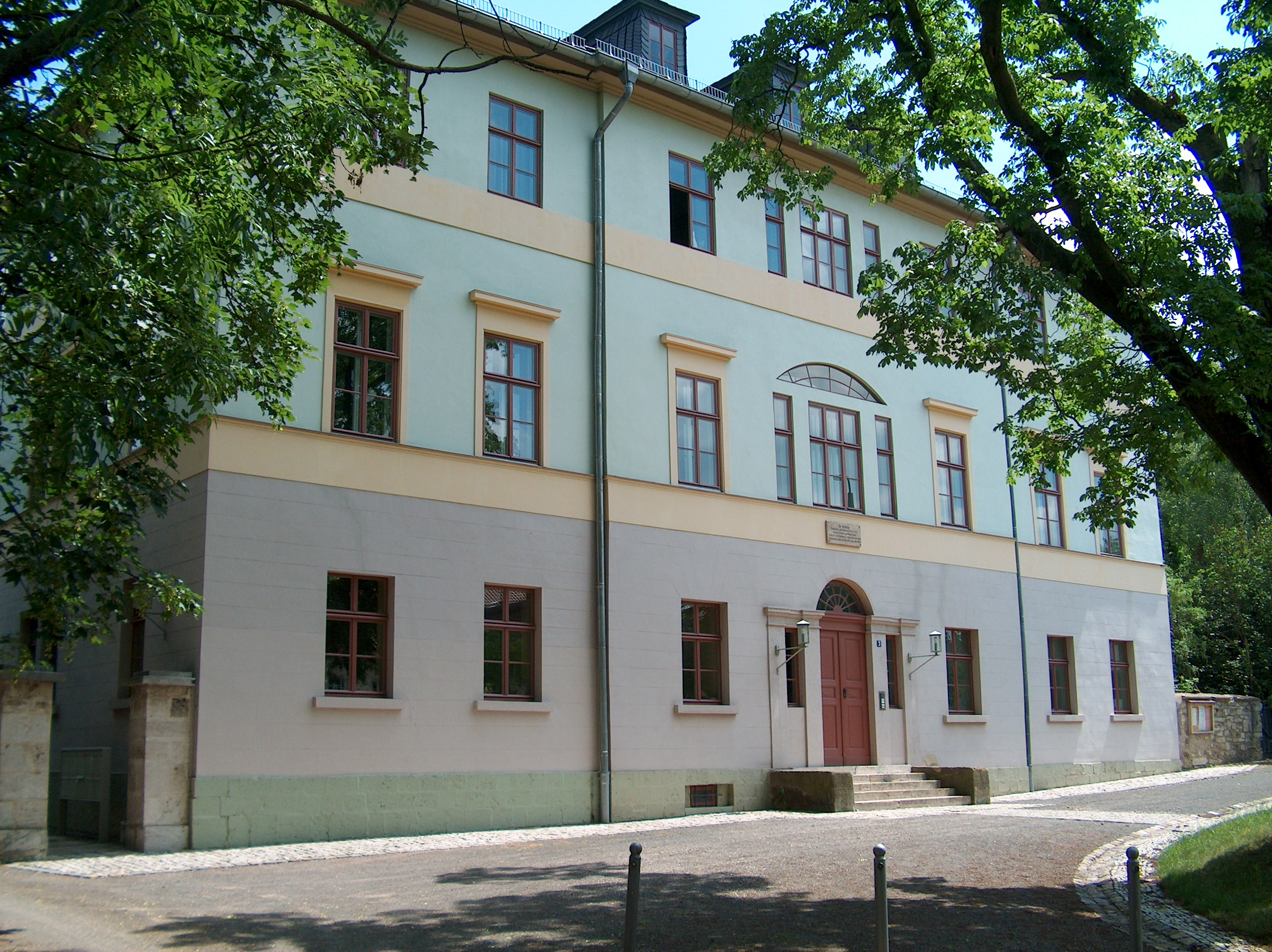
The Altenburg, Liszt's residence in Weimar (1848–1861), where he wrote the first 12 of his symphonic poems.

Franz Liszt, a Hungarian composer, had attempted to write a Revolutionary Symphony as early as 1830; however, his focus for the early part of his adult life was mostly on his performing career. By 1847, Liszt was famous throughout Europe as a virtuoso pianist. "Lisztomania" swept across Europe, the emotional charge of his recitals making them "more like séances than serious musical events", and the reaction of many of his listeners could be characterized as hysterical. Musicologist Alan Walker says, "Liszt was a natural phenomenon, and people were swayed by him.... With his mesmeric personality and long mane of flowing hair, he created a striking stage presence. And there were many witnesses to testify that his playing did indeed raise the mood of an audience to a level of mystical ecstasy." The demands of concert life "reached exponential proportions" and "every public appearance led to demands for a dozen others." Liszt desired to compose music, such as large-scale orchestral works, but lacked the time to do so as a travelling virtuoso. In September 1847, Liszt gave his last public recital as a paid artist and announced his retirement from the concert platform. He settled in Weimar, where he had been made its honorary music director in 1842, to work on his compositions.

Weimar was a small town that held many attractions for Liszt. Two of Germany's greatest men of letters, Johann Wolfgang von Goethe and Friedrich Schiller, had both lived there. As one of the cultural centers of Germany, Weimar boasted a theater and an orchestra plus its own painters, poets and scientists. The University of Jena was also nearby. Most importantly, the town's patroness was the Grand Duchess Maria Pavlovna, the sister of Tsar Nicholas I of Russia. "This triple alliance of court, theater and academia was difficult to resist." The town also received its first railway line in 1848, which gave Liszt relatively quick access from there to the rest of Germany.

== Inventing the symphonic poem ==
Liszt desired to expand single-movement works beyond the concert overture form. As he himself said, "New wine demands new bottles," and as Alan Walker points out, the "language of music was changing; it seemed pointless to Liszt to contain it in forms that were almost 100 years old." The music of overtures is to inspire listeners to imagine scenes, images, or moods; Liszt intended to combine those programmatic qualities with a scale and musical complexity normally reserved for the opening movement of Classical symphonies. The opening movement, with its interplay of contrasting themes under sonata form, was normally considered the most important part of the symphony. To achieve his objectives, he needed a more flexible method of developing musical themes than sonata form would allow, but one that would preserve the overall unity of a musical composition.

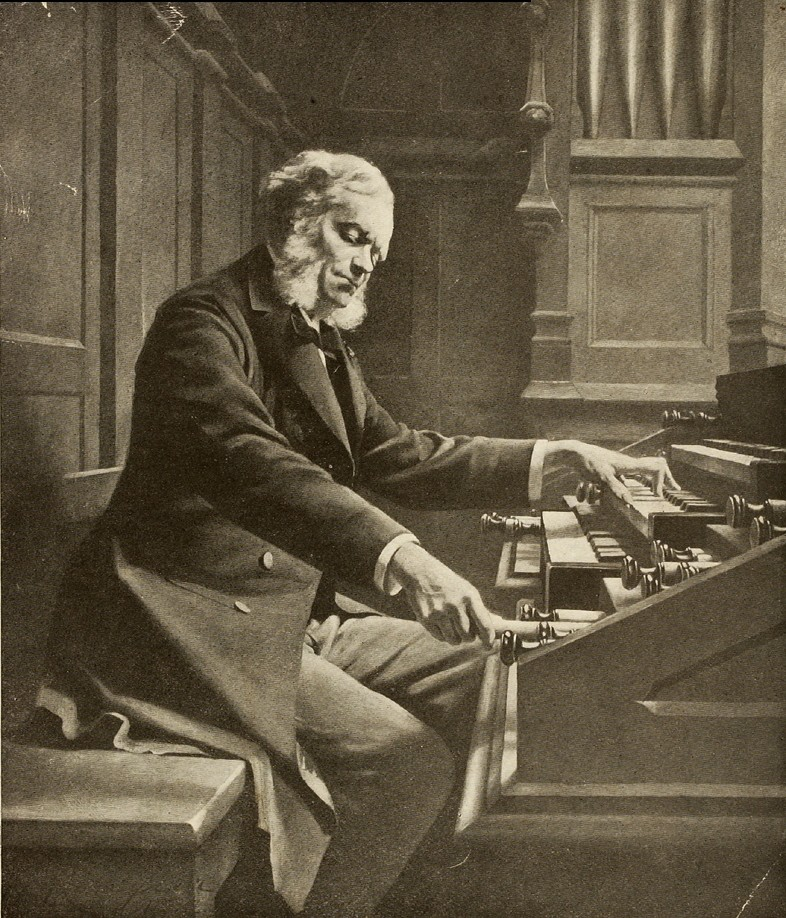
According to musicologist Norman Demuth and others, César Franck wrote the first symphonic poem.

Liszt found his method through two compositional practices, which he used in his symphonic poems. The first practice was cyclic form, a procedure established by Beethoven in which certain movements are not only linked but actually reflect one another's content. Liszt took Beethoven's practice one step further, combining separate movements into a single-movement cyclic structure. Many of Liszt's mature works follow this pattern, of which Les préludes is one of the best-known examples. The second practice was thematic transformation, a type of variation in which one theme is changed, not into a related or subsidiary theme but into something new, separate and independent. Thematic transformation, like cyclic form, was nothing new in itself; it had already been used by Mozart and Haydn. In the final movement of his Ninth Symphony, Beethoven had transformed the theme of the "Ode to Joy" into a Turkish march. Weber and Berlioz had also transformed themes, and Schubert used thematic transformation to bind together the movements of his Wanderer Fantasy, a work that had a tremendous influence on Liszt. However, Liszt perfected the creation of significantly longer formal structures solely through thematic transformation, not only in the symphonic poems but in other works such as his Second Piano Concerto and his Piano Sonata in B minor. In fact, when a work had to be shortened, Liszt tended to cut sections of conventional musical development and preserve sections of thematic transformation.

Between 1845 and 1847, Belgian-French composer César Franck wrote an orchestral piece based on Victor Hugo's poem Ce qu'on entend sur la montagne. The work exhibits characteristics of a symphonic poem, and some musicologists, such as Norman Demuth and Julien Tiersot, consider it the first of its genre, preceding Liszt's compositions. However, Franck did not publish or perform his piece; neither did he set about defining the genre. Liszt's determination to explore and promote the symphonic poem gained him recognition as the genre's inventor.

Until he coined the term "symphonic poem", Liszt introduced several of these new orchestral works as overtures; in fact, some of the poems were initially overtures or preludes for other works, only later being expanded or rewritten past the confines of the overture form. The first version of Tasso, Liszt stated, was an incidental overture for Johann Wolfgang von Goethe's 1790 drama Torquato Tasso, performed for the Weimar Goethe Centenary Festival. Orpheus was first performed in Weimar on 16 February 1854 as a prelude to Christoph Willibald Gluck's opera Orfeo ed Euridice. Likewise, Hamlet started out in 1858 as a prelude to the Shakespearean tragedy. Liszt first used the term "Symphonische Dichtung" (symphonic poem) in public at a concert in Weimar on 23 February 1854 to describe Les préludes. Later he used the term "poèmes symphoniques" in a letter to Hans von Bülow to describe Les préludes and Orpheus.

== Composition process ==
Particularly striking in his symphonic poems is Liszt's approach to musical form. As purely musical structures, they do not follow a strict presentation and development of musical themes as they would under sonata form. Instead, they follow a loose episodic pattern, in which motifs—recurring melodies associated with a subject—are thematically transformed in a manner similar to that later made famous by Richard Wagner. Recapitulations, where themes are normally restated after they are combined and contrasted in development, are foreshortened, while codas, where pieces of music generally wind to a close, are greatly enlarged to a size and scope that can affect the listener's concept of the themes. Themes shuffle into new and unexpected patterns of order, and three- or four-movement structures roll into one in a continual process of creative experimentation.

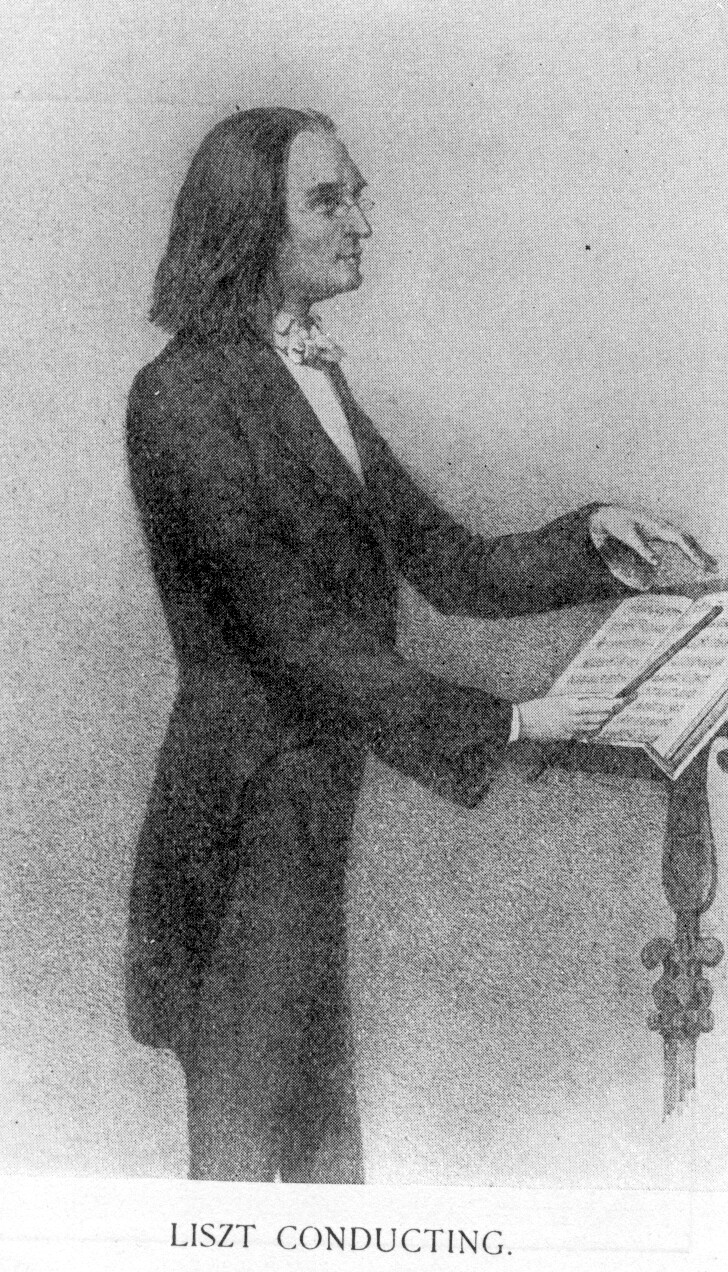
Liszt conducting. "I needed to hear [my works]", he would write, "in order to get an idea of them."

Part of this creative experimentation was a trial-and-error approach. Liszt constructed compositions with varying sections of music not necessarily having distinct beginnings and ends. He sketched sections, sometimes without fully completing them, on a small number of staves with some indication of the orchestration. After an assistant—August Conradi from 1848 to 1849, Joachim Raff from 1850 to 1853—had realized Liszt's ideas and provided a score of an acceptable standard, Liszt would then make further revisions; he moved sections to form different structural relationships, and modified connective materials or composed them anew, completing the piece of music. The score was copied, then tried out in rehearsals with the Weimarian Court orchestra and further changes made in the light of practical experience. Many years later, Liszt reminisced how his compositional development hinged on hearing an orchestra perform his works: "I needed to hear them in order to get an idea of them." He added that it was much more for this reason, and not simply for securing a public for his own works, that he promoted them in Weimar and elsewhere. After many such stages of composition, rehearsal and revision, Liszt might reach a version where the musical form seemed balanced and he was satisfied. However, it was his habit to write modifications to already printed scores. From his perspective, his compositions remained "works in progress" as he continued to reshape, rework, or add and subtract material. In some instances, a composition could exist in four or five versions simultaneously.

Tasso, based on the life of sixteenth-century Italian poet, Torquato Tasso, is a perfect example of both Liszt's working method and his achievements based on restless experimentation. The 1849 version following a conventional overture layout, divided into a slow section ("Lament") and a fast one ("Triumph"). Even with this division, the entire work was actually a set of variations on a single melody—a folk hymn sung to Liszt by a gondolier in Venice in the late 1830s. Among the most significant revisions Liszt made was the addition of a middle section in the vein of a minuet. The theme of the minuet was, again, a variant of the gondolier's folk hymn, thus becoming another example of thematic transformation. Calmer than either of the outer sections, it was intended to depict Tasso's more stable years in the employment of the Este family in Ferrara. In a margin note, Liszt informs the conductor that the orchestra "assumes a dual role" in this section; strings play a self-contained piece based on the original version of the gondolier's hymn while woodwinds play another based on the variation used in the minuet. This was very much in the manner of Italian composer Pietro Raimondi, whose contrapuntal mastery was such that he had written three oratorios—Joseph, Potiphar and Jacob—which could be performed either individually or together. Liszt made a study of Raimondi's work but the Italian composer died before Liszt could meet him personally. While the minuet section was probably added to act as a musical bridge between the opening lament and final triumphal sections, it along with other modifications "rendered the 'Tasso Overture' an overture no longer". The piece became "far too long and developed" to be considered an overture and was redesignated a symphonic poem.

== Raff's role ==
When Liszt started writing symphonic poems, "he had very little experience in handling an orchestra ... his knowledge of the technique of instrumentation was defective and he had as yet composed hardly anything for the orchestra." For these reasons he relied first on his assistants August Conradi and Joachim Raff to fill the gaps in his knowledge and find his "orchestral voice". Raff, "a gifted composer with an imaginative grasp of the orchestra", offered close assistance to Liszt. Also helpful were the virtuosi present at that time in the Weimarian Court orchestra, such as trombonist Moritz Nabich, harpist Jeanne Pohl, concertmaster Joseph Joachim and violinist Edmund Singer. "[Liszt] mixed daily with these musicians, and their discussions must have been filled with 'shop talk.'" Both Singer and cellist Bernhard Cossmann were widely experienced orchestral players who probably knew the different instrumental effects a string section could produce—knowledge that Liszt would have found invaluable, and about which he might have had many discussions with the two men. With such a range of talent from which to learn, Liszt may have actually mastered orchestration reasonably quickly. By 1853, he felt he no longer needed Raff's assistance and their professional association ended in 1856. Also, in 1854 Liszt received a specially designed instrument called a "piano-organ" from the firm of Alexandre and fils in Paris. This huge instrument, a combination of piano and organ, was basically a one-piece orchestra that contained three keyboards, eight registers, a pedal board and a set of pipes that reproduced the sounds of all the wind instruments. With it, Liszt could try out various instrumental combinations at his leisure as a further aid for his orchestration.

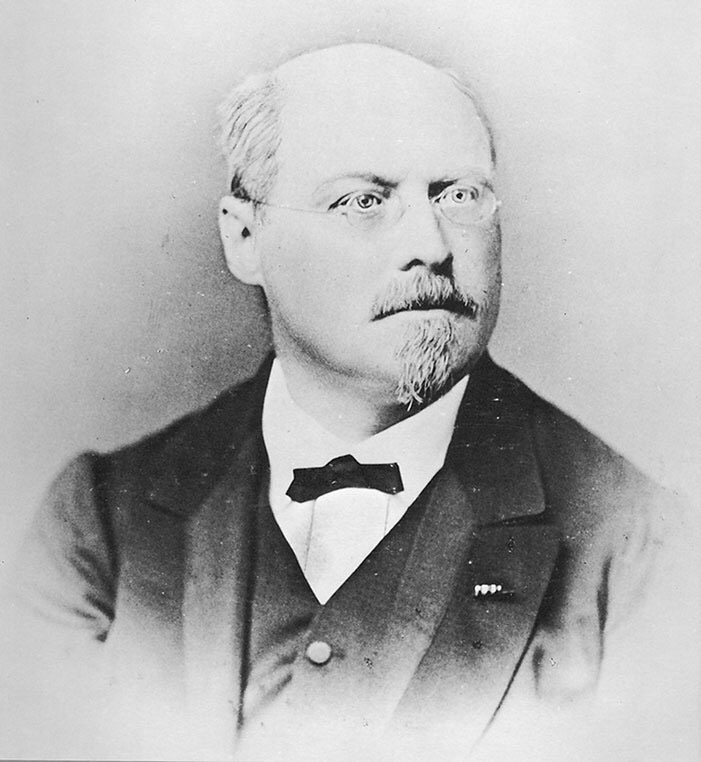
Joachim Raff, who made claims about his role in Liszt's compositional process.

While Raff was able to offer "practical suggestions [in orchestration] which were of great value to Liszt", there may have been "a basic misunderstanding" of the nature of their collaboration. Liszt wanted to learn more about instrumentation and acknowledged Raff's greater expertise in this area. Hence, he gave Raff piano sketches to orchestrate, just as he had done earlier with Conradi—"so that he might rehearse them, reflect on them, and then, as his confidence in the orchestra grew, change them." Raff disagreed, having the impression that Liszt wanted him on equal terms as a full collaborator. While attending an 1850 rehearsal of Prometheus, he told Bernhard Cossmann, who sat next to him, "Listen to the instrumentation. It is by me."

Raff continued making such claims about his role in Liszt's compositional process. Some of these accounts, published posthumously by Die Musik in 1902 and 1903, suggest that he was an equal collaborator with Liszt. Raff's assertions were supported by Joachim, who had been active in Weimar at approximately the same time as Raff. Walker writes that Joachim later recalled to Raff's widow "that he had seen Raff 'produce full orchestral scores from piano sketches.'" Joachim also told Raff's biographer Andreas Moser that "the E-flat-major Piano Concerto was orchestrated from beginning to end by Raff." Raff's and Joachim's statements effectively questioned the authorship of Liszt's orchestral music, especially the symphonic poems. This speculation was debunked when composer and Liszt scholar Peter Raabe carefully compared all sketches then known of Liszt's orchestral works with the published versions of the same works. Raabe demonstrated that, regardless of the position with first drafts, or of how much assistance Liszt may have received from Raff or Conradi at that point, every note of the final versions represents Liszt's intentions.

== Programmatic content ==
Liszt provided written prefaces for nine of his symphonic poems. His doing so, Alan Walker states, "was a reflection of the historical position in which he found himself." Liszt was aware these musical works would be experienced not just by select connoisseurs, as might have been the case in previous generations, but also by the general public. In addition, he knew about the public's fondness for attaching stories to instrumental music, regardless of their source, their relevance to a musical composition or whether the composer had actually sanctioned them. Therefore, in a pre-emptive gesture, Liszt provided context before others could invent one to take its place. Liszt may have also felt that since many of these works were written in new forms, some sort of verbal or written explanation would be welcome to explain their shape.

These prefaces have proven atypical in a couple of ways. For one, they do not spell out a specific, step-by-step scenario that the music would follow but rather a general context. Some of them, in fact, are little more than autobiographical asides on what inspired Liszt to compose a piece or what feelings he was trying to inspire through it. While these insights could prove "both useful and interesting" in themselves, Walker admits, will they aid listeners to "pictorialize the music that follows?" For Liszt, Walker concludes, the "pictorialization of a detailed program is simply not an issue." Moreover, Liszt wrote these prefaces long after he had composed the music. This was the complete opposite of other composers, who wrote their music to fit a pre-existing program. For both these reasons, Walker suggests, Liszt's prefaces could be called "programmes about music" with equal logic or validity. He adds that the prefaces might not have entirely been of Liszt's idea or doing, since evidence exists that his then-companion Princess Carolyne zu Sayn-Wittgenstein helped shape or create them.

Overall, Walker concludes, "Posterity may have overestimated the importance of extra-musical thought in Liszt's symphonic poems. We would not want to be without his prefaces, of course, nor any other that he made about the origins of his music; but we should not follow them slavishly, for the simple reason that the symphonic poems do not follow them slavishly either." Hugh MacDonald concurs that Liszt "held an idealized view of the symphonic poem" as being evocative rather than representational. "He only rarely achieved in his symphonic poems the directness and subtle timing that narrative requires," MacDonald explains; he generally focused more on expressing poetic ideas by setting a mood or atmosphere, refraining on the whole from narrative description or pictorial realism.

== Reception ==
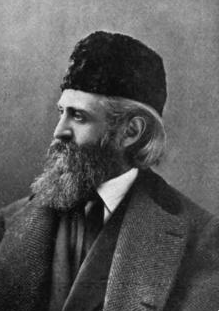
Leopold Damrosch helped popularize Liszt's symphonic poems.

Liszt composed his symphonic poems during a period of great debate among musicians in central Europe and Germany, known as the War of the Romantics. While Beethoven's work was admired universally, conservatives that included Johannes Brahms and members of the Leipzig Conservatory considered it unsurpassable. Liberals such as Liszt, Wagner and others of the New German School saw Beethoven's innovations as a beginning in music, not an end. In this climate, Liszt had emerged as a lightning-rod for the avant-garde. Even with the innovative music being written by Wagner and Berlioz, it was Liszt, Walker says, "who was making all the noise and attracting the most attention" through his musical compositions, polemic writings, conducting and teaching. (Note: The hostility between these two groups was such that, when Bülow was invited to Leipzig to give a piano recital in 1857, he was asked to drop Liszt's B minor piano sonata from his program. "People have heard that you play the things of Liszt," Ferdinand David wrote to Bülow. "Show them you that you understand no less the work of the older masters." Bülow was incensed, not only for the requested change but that David had considered Liszt's work unworthy of being called a sonata (Walker, Weimar, 348).)

Aware of the potential for controversy, Liszt wrote, "The barometer is hardly set on praise for me at the moment. I expect quite a hard downpour of rain when the symphonic poems appear." Joseph Joachim, who in his time in Weimar had found Liszt's workshop rehearsals and the trial-and-error process practiced in them to be wearisome, was dismayed at what he considered their lack of creativity. Vienna music critic Eduard Hanslick found even the term "Sinfonische Dichtung" contradictory and offensive; he wrote against them with vehemence after he had heard only one, Les préludes. Surgeon Theodor Billroth, who was also a musical friend of Brahms, wrote of them, "This morning [Brahms] and Kirchner played the Symphonic Poems (sic) of Liszt on two pianos ... music of hell, and can't even be called music—toilet paper music! I finally vetoed Liszt on medical grounds and we purged ourselves with Brahms's [piano arrangement of the] G Major String Sextet." Wagner was more receptive; he agreed with the idea of the unity of the arts that Liszt espoused and wrote as much in his "Open Letter on Liszt's Symphonic Poems". Walker considers this letter seminal in the War of the Romantics:

It is filled with penetrating observations about the true nature of "programme music", about the mysterious relationship between "form" and "content" and about the historical links that bind the symphonic poem to the classical symphony.... The symphonic poems, Wagner assured his readers, were first and foremost music. Their importance for history ... lay in the fact that Liszt had discovered a way of creating his material from the potential essence of the other arts.... Wagner's central observations are so accurate ... that we can only assume that there had been a number of discussions between [Liszt and Wagner] as to what exactly a "symphonic poem" really was.

Such was the controversy over these works that two points were overlooked by the critics. First, Liszt's own attitude toward program music was derived from Beethoven's Pastoral Symphony, and he would have likely argued that his music, like the Pastoral, was "more the expression of feeling than painting." Second, more conservative composers such as Felix Mendelssohn and Brahms had also written program music. Mendelssohn's The Hebrides Overture could be considered a musical seascape based on autobiographical experience but indistinguishable in musical intent from Liszt's symphonic poems. By titling the first of his Op. 10 Ballades as "Edward", Brahms nominated it as the musical counterpart of its old Scottish saga and namesake. This was not the only time Brahms would write program music.

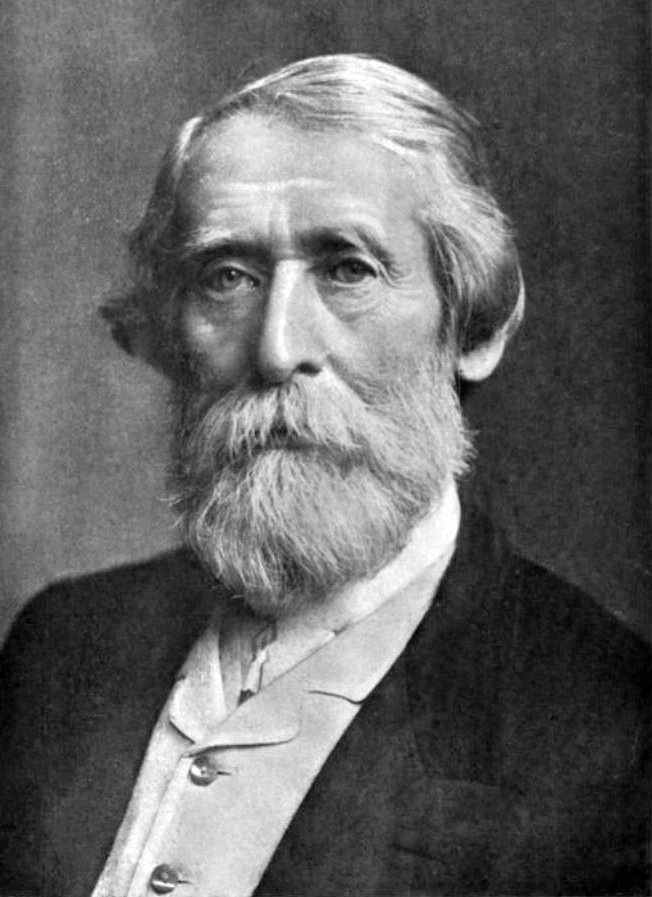
Karl Klindworth, another Liszt follower who conducted the symphonic poems.

Liszt's new works did not find guaranteed success in their audiences, especially in cities where listeners were accustomed to more conservative music programming. While Liszt had "a solid success" with Prometheus and Orpheus in 1855 when he conducted in Brunswick, the climate for Les Préludes and Tasso that December in Berlin was cooler. His performance of Mazeppa two years later in Leipzig was almost stopped due to hissing from the audience. A similar incident occurred when Hans von Bülow conducted Die Ideale in Berlin in 1859; after the performance, the conductor turned on the audience and ordered the demonstrators to leave, "as it is not customary to hiss in this hall." Matters improved somewhat in the following decades, thanks to the efforts of Liszt disciples such as Bülow, Karl Tausig, Leopold Damrosch and Karl Klindworth. Nevertheless, audiences at the time found the compositions puzzling.

The audiences may have been challenged by the works' complexity, which have also caused problems for musicians. Written in new forms, the symphonic poems used unorthodox time signatures, producing an unusual beat at times. The irregular rhythm proved difficult to play and sounded erratic to listeners. Compared to the mellower harmonies of Mozart's or Haydn's symphonies, or many operatic arias of the time, the symphonic poem's advanced harmonies could produce harsh or awkward music. Due to its use of unusual key signatures, the symphonic poem had many sharp and flat notes, more than a standard musical work. The greater number of notes posed a challenge to musicians, who have to vary the pitch of the notes in accordance with the score. The quick fluctuations in the speed of the music were another factor in the symphonic poem's complexity. The constant use of chamber-music textures, which are produced by having single players perform extended solo passages or having small groups play ensemble passages, put a stress on the orchestra; the mistakes of the solo artist or small groups would not be "covered up" by the mass sound of the orchestra and were obvious to everyone.

These aspects of the symphonic poem demanded players to have superior caliber, perfect intonation, keen ears and knowledge of the roles of their orchestra members. The complexity of the symphonic poems may have been one reason that Liszt urged other conductors to "hold aloof" from the works until they were prepared to deal with the challenges. Most orchestras of small towns at that time were not capable of meeting the demands of this music. Contemporary orchestras also faced another challenge when playing Liszt's symphonic poems for the first time. Liszt kept his works on manuscripts, distributing them to the orchestra on his tour. Some parts of the manuscripts were so heavily corrected that players found it difficult to decipher them, let alone play them well. The symphonic poems were considered such a financial risk that orchestral parts for many of them were not published until the 1880s.

== Legacy ==
With the exception of Les préludes, none of the symphonic poems have entered the standard repertoire, though critics suggest that the best of them—Prometheus, Hamlet and Orpheus—are worth further listening. Musicologist Hugh MacDonald writes, "Unequal in scope and achievement though they are, they looked forward at times to more modern developments and sowed the seeds of a rich crop of music in the two succeeding generations." Speaking of the genre itself, MacDonald adds that, although the symphonic poem is related to opera in its aesthetics, it effectively supplanted opera and sung music by becoming "the most sophisticated development of programme music in the history of the genre." Liszt authority Humphrey Searle essentially concurs with MacDonald, writing that Liszt "wished to expound philosophical and humanistic ideas which were of the greatest importance to him." These ideas were not only connected with Liszt's personal problems as an artist, but they also coincided with explicit problems being addressed by writers and painters of the era.

In developing the symphonic poem, Liszt "satisfied three of the principal aspirations of 19th century music: to relate music to the world outside, to integrate multi-movement forms ... and to elevate instrumental programme music to a level higher than that of opera, the genre previously regarded as the highest mode of musical expression." In fulfilling these needs, the symphonic poems played a major role, widening the scope and expressive power of the advanced music of its time. According to music historian Alan Walker, "Their historical importance is undeniable; both Sibelius and Richard Strauss were influenced by them, and adapted and developed the genre in their own way. For all their faults, these pieces offer many examples of the pioneering spirit for which Liszt is celebrated."

== List of works ==
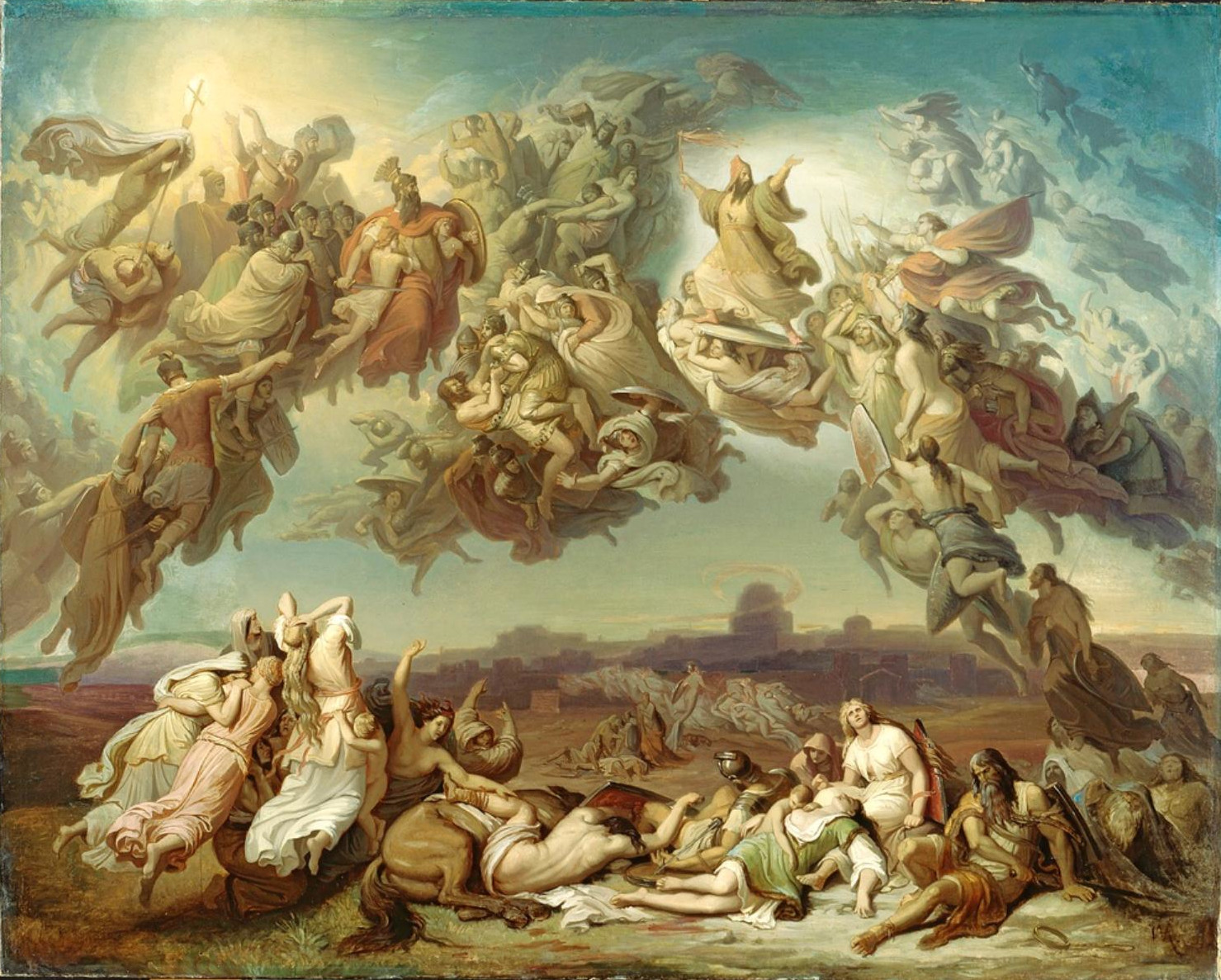
Die Hunnenschlacht, as painted by Wilhelm von Kaulbach, upon which Liszt based his symphonic poem of the same name.

In chronological order from the beginning date of composition, the symphonic poems are as follows (the published numbering differs as shown):

- No. 8 Héroïde funèbre (1830–1856)
- No. 9 Hungaria (1830–1857)
- No. 6 Mazeppa, after Hugo (1838–1854)
- No. 2 Tasso: lamento e trionfo, after Byron (1840–1854)
- No. 3 Les préludes, after Lamartine (1845?–1854)
- No. 1 Ce qu'on entend sur la montagne, after Hugo (1845?–1854)
- No. 5 Prometheus (1850–1855)
- No. 7 Festklänge (1853–1854)
- No. 4 Orpheus (1854)
- No. 12 Die Ideale, after Schiller (1857–1858)
- No. 11 Hunnenschlacht, after Kaulbach (1857–1861)
- No. 10 Hamlet, after Shakespeare (1858–1861)
- No. 13 Von der Wiege bis zum Grabe, after Mihály Zichy (1881–1883)

== Related works ==
Liszt's Faust and Dante symphonies share the same aesthetic stance as the symphonic poems; though they are multi-movement works that employ a chorus, their compositional methods and aims are alike. Two Episodes from Lenau's Faust should also be considered with the symphonic poems. The first, "Der nächtliche Zug", is closely descriptive of Faust as he watches a passing procession of pilgrims by night. The second, "Der Tanz in der Dorfschenke", which is also known as the First Mephisto Waltz, tells of Mephistopheles seizing a violin at a village dance.

== See also ==
- List of symphonic poems

== Bibliography ==
- Bonds, Mark Evan, "Symphony: II. 19th century," The New Grove Dictionary of Music and Musicians, Second Edition (London: Macmillan, 2001). ISBN 0-333-60800-3.
- Cay, Peter, Schnitzler's Century: The Making of Middle-class Culture 1815-1914 (New York and London: W.W. Norton & Company, 2002). ISBN 0-393-0-4893-4.
- Godfrey, Margaret (2009). "Tasso: Lamento e Trionfo, symphonic poem for orchestra (4 versions), S. 96 (LW G2)". allmusic.com.
- Larue, Jan and Eugene K. Wolf, ed. Stanley Sadie, "Symphony: I. 18th century," The New Grove Dictionary of Music and Musicians, Second Edition (London: Macmillan, 2001), 29 vols. ISBN 0-333-60800-3.
- MacDonald, Hugh, ed Stanley Sadie, "Symphonic Poem", The New Grove Dictionary of Music and Musicians, First Edition (London: Macmillan, 1980), 20 vols. ISBN 0-333-23111-2
- MacDonald, Hugh, ed Stanley Sadie, "Symphonic Poem", The New Grove Dictionary of Music and Musicians, Second Edition (London: Macmillan, 2001), 29 vols. ISBN 0-333-60800-3.
- Mueller, Rena Charin, Liszt's "Tasso" Sketchbook: Studies in Sources and Revisions, Ph. D. dissertation, New York University 1986.
- Murray, Michael, French Masters of the Organ: Saint-Saëns, Franck, Widor, Vierne, Dupré, Langlais, Messiaen (New Haven and London: Yale University Press, 1998). ISBN 0-300-07291-0.
- Saffle, Michael, "Orchestral Works", Chapter 10 in The Liszt Companion, ed. Ben Arnold (Westport: Greenwood Press, 2002). ISBN 0-313-30689-3
- Salmi, Hannu, 19th Century Europe: A Cultural History (Cambridge, UK and Malden, MA: Polity Press, 2008). ISBN 978-0-7456-4359-5
- Schonberg, Harold C., The Great Conductors (New York: Simon and Schuster, 1967). Library of Congress Catalog Card Number 67-19821.
- Searle, Humphrey, ed Stanley Sadie, "Liszt, Franz", The New Grove Dictionary of Music and Musicians, First Edition (London: Macmillan, 1980), 20 vols. ISBN 0-333-23111-2
- Searle, Humphrey, ed. Alan Walker, "The Orchestral Works", Franz Liszt: The Man and His Music (New York: Taplinger Publishing Company, 1970). SBN 8008-2990-5
- Searle, Humphrey, The Music of Liszt, 2nd rev. ed. (New York: Dover, 1966). Library of Congress Catalog Card Number 66-27581.
- Shulstad, Reeves, ed. Kenneth Hamilton, "Liszt's symphonic poems and symphonies", The Cambridge Companion to Liszt (Cambridge and New York: Cambridge University Press, 2005). ISBN 0-521-64462-3 (paperback).
- Spencer, Piers, ed. Alison Latham, "Symphonic poem [tone-poem]", The Oxford Companion to Music (Oxford and New York: Oxford University Press, 2002). ISBN 0-19-866212-2
- Swafford, Jan, Johannes Brahms: A Biography (New York: Alfred A. Knopf, 1997). ISBN 0-679-42261-7.
- Trevitt, John and Marie Fauquet, ed. Stanley Sadie, "Franck, César(-Auguste-Jean-Guillaume-Hubert)" The New Grove Dictionary of Music and Musicians, Second Edition (London: Macmillan, 2001), 29 vols. ISBN 0-333-60800-3.
- Ulrich, Homer, Symphonic Music: Its Evolution since the Renaissance (New York: Columbia University Press, 1952). ISBN 0-231-01908-4.
- Walker, Alan, ed Stanley Sadie, "Liszt, Franz", The New Grove Dictionary of Music and Musicians, 2nd ed. (London: Macmillan, 2001). ISBN 0-333-60800-3
- Walker, Alan, Franz Liszt (New York: Alfred A. Knopf). ISBN 0-394-52540-X
  - Volume 1: The Virtuoso Years, 1811–1847 (1983)
  - Volume 2: The Weimar Years, 1848–1861 (1989)
- Watson, Derek, Liszt, London, JM Dent, 1989, pp. 348–351.
- Weber, William, ed. Stanley Sadie, "Concert," The New Grove Dictionary of Music and Musicians, 2nd ed. (London: Macmillan, 2001). ISBN 0-333-60800-3.
