= Poème symphonique (disambiguation) =

Poème symphonique may refer to:

- Poème symphonique for 100 metronomes, by György Ligeti
- Ce qu'on entend sur la montagne, Poème symphonique no. 1, by Franz Liszt
- Tasso, Lamento e Trionfo (Liszt), Poème symphonique no. 2, by Franz Liszt
- Les préludes, Poème symphonique no. 3, by Franz Liszt
- Orpheus (Liszt), Poème symphonique no. 4, by Franz Liszt
- Prometheus (Liszt), Poème symphonique no. 5, by Franz Liszt
- Mazeppa (symphonic poem), Poème symphonique no. 6, by Franz Liszt
- Hunnenschlacht (Liszt), Poème symphonique no. 11, by Franz Liszt
