= Dennis Hennig =

Australian pianist (1951–1993)

Dennis Hennig (28 February 1951 – 17 January 1993) was an Australian pianist.

== Biography ==
At an early stage of his career he was one of the Australian Ballet's rehearsal class pianists, and later performed live music for ballet performances such as Signatures, An Evening, Seven Deadly Sins and Nearly Beloved. He also taught at the Sydney Conservatorium of Music.

Ross Edwards dedicated his Piano Concerto (1982) to Hennig, who was soloist at the premiere performance in 1983 with the Queensland Symphony Orchestra under Werner Andreas Albert. He also recorded the work with the QSO under Myer Fredman. He made numerous other recordings, and at his death he was engaged on a project to record all of Cyril Scott's piano works, but he had completed only 2 CDs. He wrote on the music of Charles-Valentin Alkan.

He played the piano for the music for Jane Campion's first film Two Friends.

Dennis Hennig died of an AIDS-related condition in early 1993, aged 41. A medal in his memory is presented at the Sydney International Piano Competition.

== Recordings ==
His recordings include:

- Ross Edwards: Piano Concerto (Queensland Symphony Orchestra under Myer Fredman) - world premiere recording
- Franz Liszt arr. Carl Tausig: symphonic poems Tasso, Hamlet, Les préludes, Orpheus – world premiere recordings
- Bohuslav Martinů: Sinfonietta giocosa for piano and orchestra (Australian Chamber Orchestra under Sir Charles Mackerras)
- Cyril Scott: Two Pieces, Op. 47; Lotus Land; Columbine; Two Pierrot Pieces, Op. 35; Pierrette; Poems; Trois Danses tristes, Op. 74; Over the Prairie (Two Impressions); Piano Sonata No. 1, Op. 66
- Scott: In the Garden of Soul Sympathy
- Richard Wagner arr. Tausig: excerpts from Tristan und Isolde and Die Walküre; Kaisermarsch
- Felix Werder: Banker
- "Pianistic Peccadilloes: selected pieces from the repertoire of Miss Arabella Goddard, Eileen Joyce, Percy Grainger, Teresa Carreño and others":
  - Bach: Toccata and Fugue in D minor
  - Thalberg: Air anglais varié
  - Leschetizky: Andante finale from Lucia di Lammermoor
  - Carreño: Little Waltz
  - Moszkowski: Concert Waltz in E
  - Raff: La fileuse
  - Anton Rubinstein: Melody in F, Op. 3, No. 1
  - Rubinstein: Trot de cavalerie
  - Mozart: Serenade from Don Giovanni
  - Grainger: Ramble on the Last love duet in Richard Strauss's opera The Rose Bearer
  - Dett: In the bottoms
  - Guion: Alley tunes
  - Gershwin: Love walked in
  - Gershwin: The man I love
  - Grunfeld: Soirée de Vienne.
