= Hunnenschlacht =

(Die) Hunnenschlacht (German for "[the] battle of the Huns") may refer to:

- Hlöðskviða, sometimes called Hunnenschlacht, an Old Norse epic poem
- Hunnenschlacht, an 1854 fresco by Wilhelm von Kaulbach
- Hunnenschlacht (Liszt), an 1857 symphonic poem inspired by the painting

== See also ==
- Media related to Hunnenschlacht by Kaulbach at Wikimedia Commons
- Battle of the Catalaunian Plains (451), major historical battle of the Huns
