= Orpheus (Liszt) =

Symphonic poem by Franz Liszt

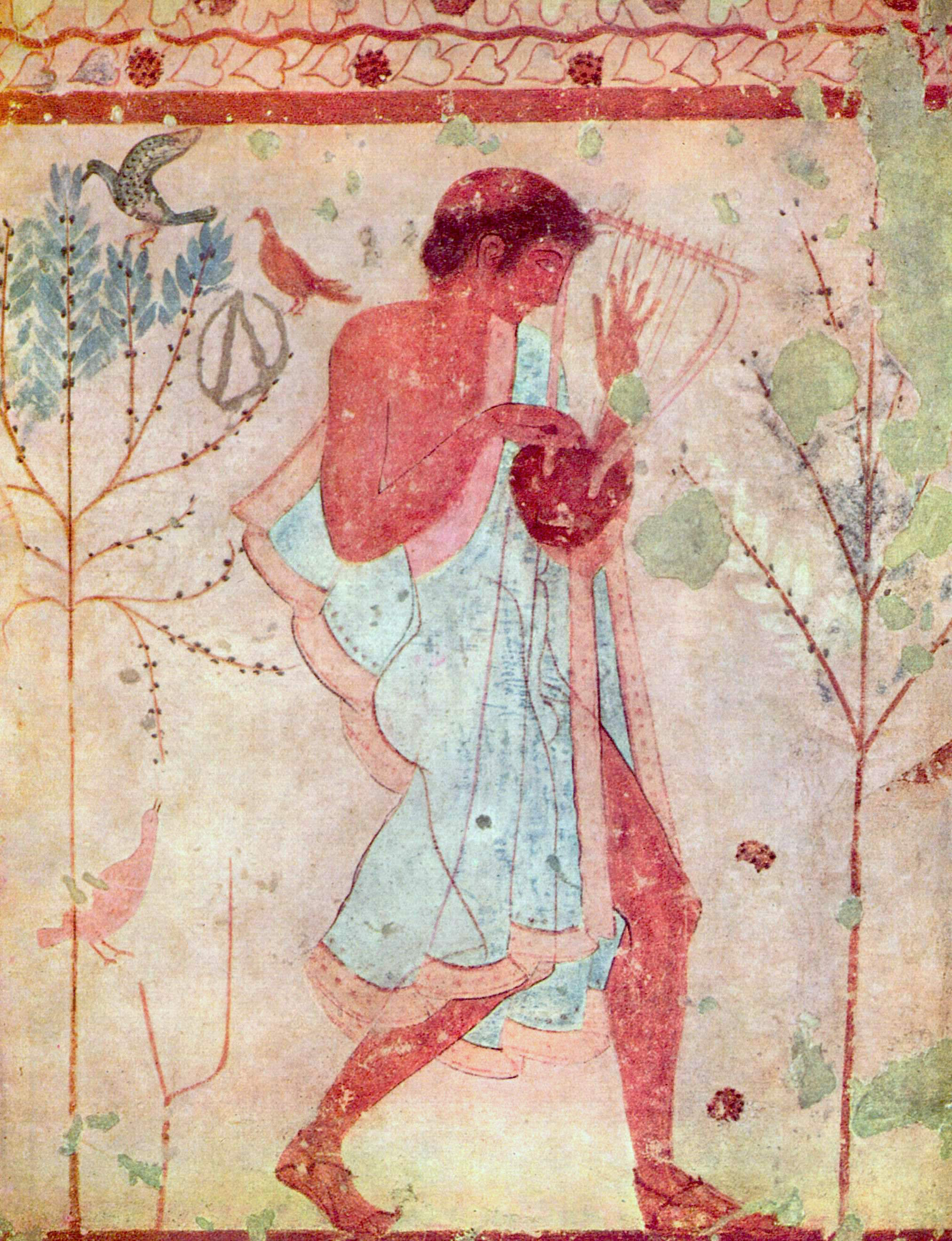
Etruscan musician with a barbiton, Tomb of the Triclinium, Tarquinia

Orpheus is a symphonic poem written by Franz Liszt in 1853–54. He numbered it No. 4 in the cycle of 12 he wrote during his time in Weimar, Germany. It was first performed on 16 February 1854, conducted by the composer, as an introduction to the first Weimar performance of Christoph Willibald Gluck's opera Orfeo ed Euridice. The performance helped celebrate the birthday of Weimar's Grand Duchess Maria Pavlovna, who was an amateur musician and a staunch supporter of Liszt at Weimar.

== Overview ==
=== Program ===
Orpheus is one of four symphonic poems Liszt composed as character sketches of men of creative genius, heroism or legend. (The other three poems are Tasso, Prometheus and Mazeppa.) In his preface Liszt describes an Etruscan vase depicting Orpheus, then extols civilizing effect on humanity. This reference to the ennobling effect of Orpheus and his art may have been derived from the Orpheus depicted by the French philosopher Pierre-Simon Ballanche in Orphée in 1829. By introducing civilised laws, the Orpheus of this nine-volume work leads humanity into the modern age; this was intended by Ballanche to provide a new philosophy for all of Europe. Liszt was an acquaintance and supporter of Ballanche, and Liszt's enthusiasm was shared by members of the French salons during the 1830s, especially by George Sand.

=== Instrumentation ===
The work is scored for piccolo, 2 flutes, 2 oboes, English horn, 2 clarinets, 2 bassoons, 4 horns, 2 trumpets, 3 trombones, tuba, timpani, 2 harps and strings.

Especially noteworthy is Orpheus's instrumentation, which includes two harps; their representation of Orpheus's lyre in the opening 14 bars immediately focuses the listener's attention on this instrument. Harpist Jeanne Pohl, one of the new virtuoso players brought to Weimar by Liszt to augment the court orchestra, inspired the composer to pen these effects.

=== Structure ===
Orpheus is not a long work and takes the form of a gradual crescendo followed by a quiet ending which returns to the mood of the opening. Unlike many of Liszt's other symphonic poems, the music here remains largely contemplative. For this reason, it became a favorite piece of Liszt's son-in-law, the composer Richard Wagner.

Formally, Orpheus is a modified sonata form with a secondary key area containing two themes. The second theme lacks the energy of the first, remaining a static motif hovering over oscillating major and minor harmonies. Nevertheless, it contains an especially poignant quality. This theme is presented by various solo instruments to a primarily harp accompaniment. The orchestration, together with the style, suggests an interpretation of this theme as Orpheus' voice.

The ethereal, chromatic ascent in the final bars attenuates any decisive closure that could be expected from a more conventional harmonic resolution. Combined with the closing theme of the second group, this ends the work as a cryptic vision which recalls the final moments of Ballanche's story. There the story's narrator, Thamyris, witnesses Orpheus disappearing into the clouds, leaving mankind the task of developing his teachings of civilisation.

== Bibliography ==
- ed. Hamilton, Kenneth, The Cambridge Companion to Liszt (Cambridge and New York: Cambridge University Press, 2005). ISBN 0-521-64462-3 (paperback).
  - Shulstad, Reeves, "Liszt's symphonic poems and symphonies"
- ed. Walker, Alan, Franz Liszt: The man and His Music (New York: Taplinger Publkishing Company, 1970). SBN 8008-2990-5
  - Searle, Humphrey, "The Orchestral Works"
- Walker, Alan, Franz Liszt, Volume 2: The Weimar Years, 1848–1861 (New York: Alfred A Knopf, 1989). ISBN 0-394-52540-X
