= Hamlet (Liszt) =

Symphonic poem, composed by Franz Liszt

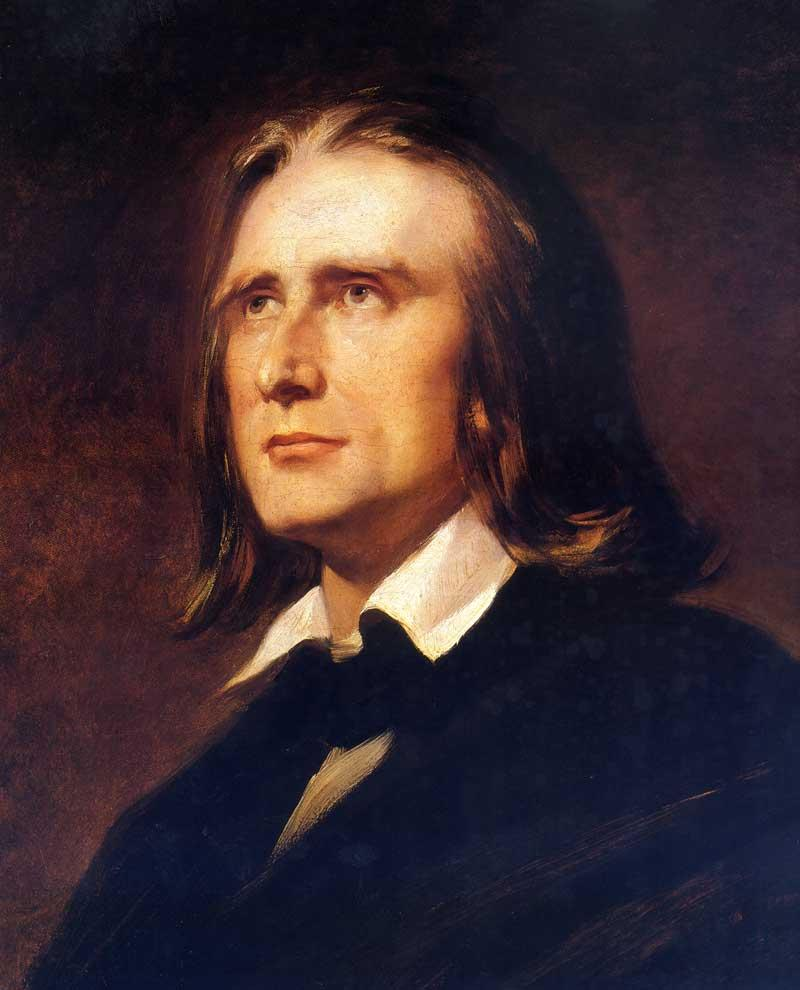
Portrait of Franz Liszt (1856) by Wilhelm von Kaulbach

Hamlet, S.104, is a symphonic poem by Franz Liszt, written in 1858 and published as No. 10. It was not performed until 2 July 1876. Like all but one of Liszt's 13 symphonic poems, Hamlet was written while Liszt was working in Weimar and is dedicated to Carolyne zu Sayn-Wittgenstein. After viewing Bogumil Dawison play Hamlet in Weimar (1856), Liszt wrote:

He does not make him into an indecisive dreamer who collapses under the power of his mission, as he is regarded since Goethe's theory in Wilhelm Meister, but much more as a gifted, enterprising prince with important political views who is waiting for the right moment to complete his work of revenge and come to the aim of his ambition, that is, to be crowned king in place of his uncle. This goal can naturally not be reached in twenty-four hours and the clever anticipation which Shakespeare has put into the role of Hamlet and the negotiations with England which come clearly to the light of day at the end of the drama according to my view justify Dawson's interpretation, which Herr von Goethe and the aesthetes should not take too badly.

Regarding Ophelia, Liszt wrote:

She is loved by Hamlet, but Hamlet, like every exceptional person, imperiously demands the wine of life and will not content himself with the buttermilk. He wishes to be understood by her without the obligation of explaining himself to her. She collapses under her mission, because she is incapable of loving him in the way that he must be loved, and her madness is only the decrescendo of her feeling, whose lack of sureness has not allowed her to remain on the level of Hamlet.

Liszt's Hamlet is meant as a psychological study of the title character; only two brief references are made to Ophelia, both marked as "to be played as quietly as possible and sound like a shadowy picture."
