= Man lebt nur einmal! =

1855 waltz by Johann Strauss II

Man lebt nur einmal! (German pronunciation: [man ˈleːpt nuːɐ̯ ˈʔaɪnmaːl], You Only Live Once!) is a waltz by Johann Strauss II written in 1855. The piece was marked as im Ländlerstyle which in other words means "in the same style as the Ländler", which is an Austrian folk dance. The title was a quotation from Johann Wolfgang von Goethe's 1774 play Clavigo, but it raised a few eyebrows at that time as Vienna was just recovering from a disastrous cholera epidemic and many of the stricken populace may have been superstitious of such a title. Nonetheless, Strauss performed it at the Sperl Ballroom to great acclaim and this waltz has endured lasting appeal even in a simple string arrangement for a quintet consisting of two violins, one viola, one cello, and a double bass.

The introduction is a rustic Austrian countryside evocation, with flutes announcing the first bars. The first waltz section is undoubtedly Viennese in character however, with a similar mood second part of the first section. The sections 2 to 4 are genial and unsurprisingly cheerful whereas the fifth section is an excellent landler adaptation. The coda is short with the first waltz theme making a quiet reentry. As the waltz proceeds to its close, a short snatch from the introduction melody comes in again before its anticipated ending.
