= Festklänge (Liszt) =

Symphonic poem by Franz Liszt

Festklänge, S. 101, is the seventh symphonic poem by Franz Liszt. Written in 1853 during Liszt's time in Weimar, it was first performed on 9 November 1854 and was published in 1857. The German title means "festive sounds", and Liszt had intended the piece to be played at his wedding to Princess Carolyne zu Sayn-Wittgenstein.
