= Héroïde funèbre (Liszt) =

Symphonic poem by Franz Liszt

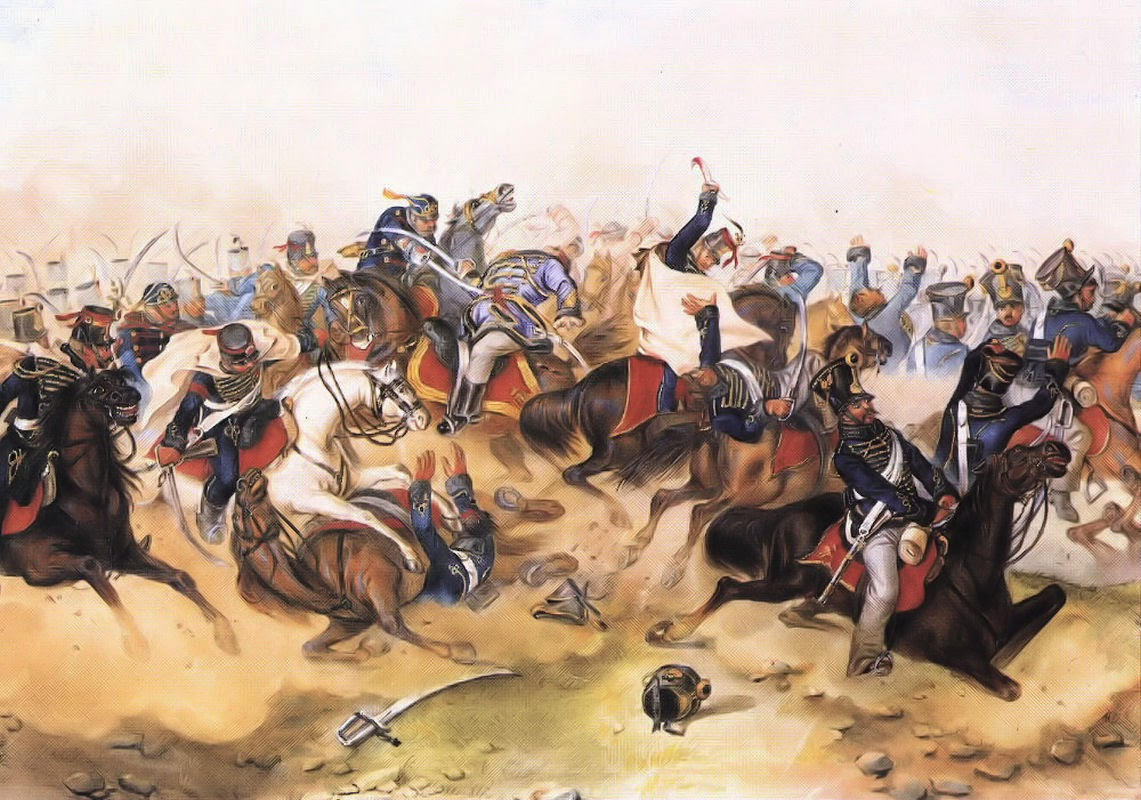
A portrayal of the Battle at Tápióbicske, a battle between Hungarian revolutionists and the Hungarian Government

Héroïde funèbre, S. 102, is a symphonic poem written by Franz Liszt in 1850 and published in 1857 as No. 8. The work originated as the first movement of a planned Revolutionary Symphony inspired by the July Revolution. Liszt pays homage in this programmatic symphonic poem to the soldiers and men that died fighting in revolutionary efforts.

== Background ==
The composition of this piece was started in 1830 as a brief sketch for a full symphony, but was dropped by Liszt in the continuing of other works. However, in 1848, there was an uprising in Liszt's home country of Hungary. One of Liszt's friends was killed during this revolution, which caused Liszt to revisit his now 20 year old sketch of the Revolutionary Symphony, shortening it and forming the first movement into the commemorative Héroïde funèbre.

Liszt said of the program, "In these successive wars and carnages, sinister sports, whatever be the colours of the flags which rise proudly and boldly against each other, on both sides they float soaked with heroic blood and inexhaustible tears. It is for Art to throw her ennobling veil over the tomb of the brave, to encircle with her golden halo the dead and dying, that they may be the envy of the living."

== Music ==
Héroïde funèbre takes the form of a funeral march, divided up into several sections. The work relies heavily on the use of Hungarian chordal structure and scales, as well as the use of a field snare that introduces the ominous draw of this highly expressive march. It is written in the key of F minor. The first section states the main theme, which is a combination of Hungarian melodies and droning low strings to create a longing cry for those deceased.

This theme is passed around the winds and strings of the orchestra, and at times there is a soft accompaniment of bells and chimes, indicating the tolling of funeral bells. These bells come back stronger near the end of the section in tandem with a rapid succession of chromatic notes played by the strings, adding to the tone of absolute devastation at the loss of friends and allies. The section comes to a close with a restatement of the rolling snare, restating the idea of a military funeral. The next section is much less anguished in tone, instead relying on a hauntingly nostalgic melody in the upper winds to portray the sorrow felt at the loss. In this section, Liszt also introduces a theme played on the brass that heavily reassembles a part of La Marseillaise, the national anthem of France. In the third and final section, Liszt restates the dramatic theme from the beginning, as well as including small bursts of hopeful moments taken from the second section and La Marseillaise. Finally, the piece ends with sombre chorale-like chords in the key of F minor and the rolling of the snare that started the piece.
