= August Conradi =

German organist and composer (1821–1873)

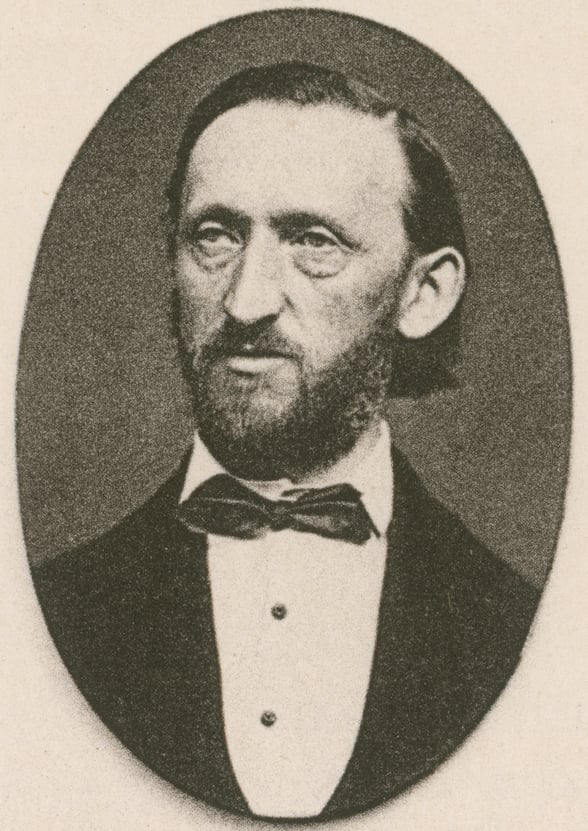
August Conradi

August Conradi (27 June 1821 – 26 May 1873) was a German organist and composer.

== Life ==
Born in Berlin, Conradi was originally intended by his father to study theology. Instead, he was enrolled at the Prussian Academy of Arts in Berlin. There he studied harmony and composition with Carl Friedrich Rungenhagen, director of the Sing-Akademie zu Berlin. In 1843, he became a church organist of Invalidenhaus, Berlin, also writing his first symphony plus a Zigeunerpolka for orchestra the same year. The latter was arranged for piano by Hungarian pianist and composer Franz Liszt. Conradi held various conducting appointments; these included Stettin (1849), Berlin (1850), Düsseldorf (1852), and Cologne (1853), then Berlin again at such theaters as Kroll's, the Wallner-Theater and the Victoria-Theater.

Conradi probably met Liszt in the early 1840s. He served as Liszt's copyist in Weimar in January and February 1844, and he spent 18 months there in 1848 and 1849 at Liszt's instigation. Conradi prepared copies of the initial versions of Liszt's orchestral works, making suggestions on scoring. He also assisted Liszt in assembling a "Programme general" of all the repertory he had played during his virtuoso years. While Conradi was an extremely hard worker, he also possessed a somewhat routine mind. When he received his appointment as Kapellmeister in Stettin in the winter of 1849, his work at Weimar was taken over by the more imaginative Joachim Raff. Nevertheless, Liszt continued to use him as a copyist. In September, 1855 Liszt wrote of his intention to send the score of his Psalm 13 to Berlin so that Conradi could make a fair copy for the first performance there.

The extent of Conradi's help with Liszt's early orchestration has been well documented by Liszt scholar Peter Raabe, who demonstrated that, whatever the position regarding initial drafts, the final versions were always Liszt's own.

Conradi wrote eight operas, a ballet, five symphonies, overtures, and string quartets as well as dance music, songs, vaudeville sketches, farces and potpourris, which were performed in garden concerts for many years.

== Bibliography ==
- Searle, Humphrey: "Conradi, August", in Sadie, Stanley (ed.): The New Grove Dictionary of Music and Musicians (London: Macmillan, 1980); ISBN 0-333-23111-2
- Walker, Alan: "Conradi, August", in Sadie, Stanley (ed.): The New Grove Dictionary of Music and Musicians (London: Macmillan, 2001); ISBN 0-333-60800-3
