= Die Ideale =

Symphonic poem by Franz Liszt

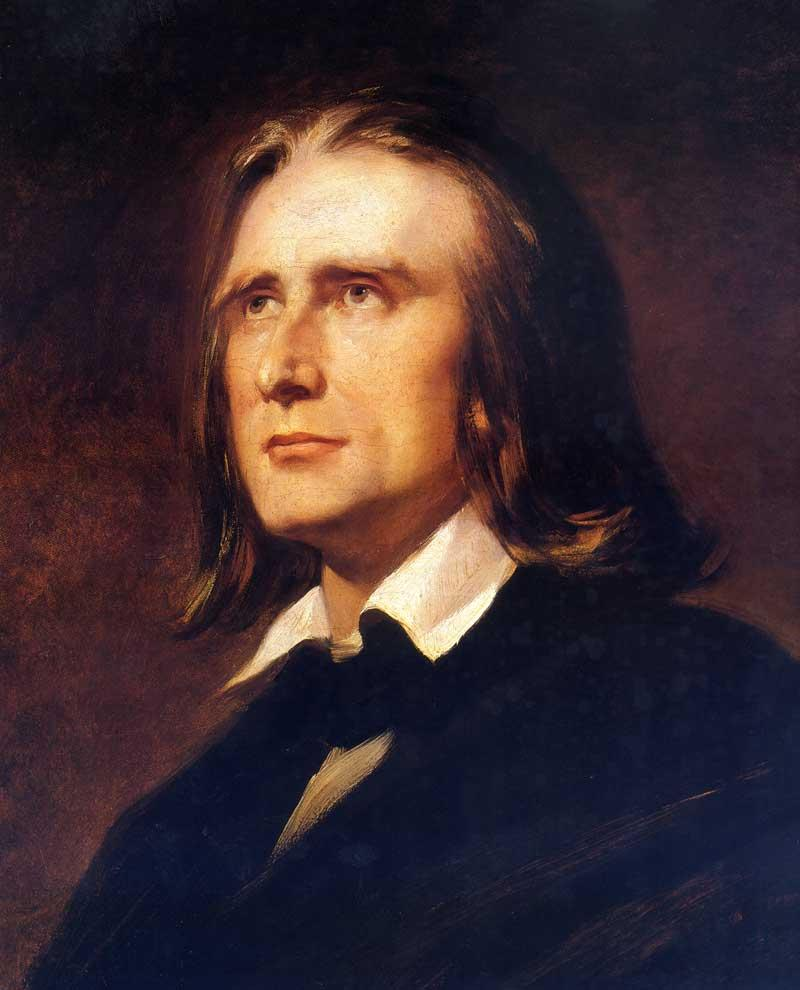
Portrait of Franz Liszt (1856) by Wilhelm von Kaulbach

Die Ideale ("The Ideals"), S. 106, is a symphonic poem composed by Franz Liszt in 1856–57 and published in 1858 as No. 12. It was first performed on 5 September 1857. Die Ideale was composed for the unveiling of a Goethe and Schiller monument on 5 September 1857. It was inspired by multiple passages of the poem of the same name by Schiller, which Liszt rearranged to create a program to his liking. This is an example of the extreme to which Liszt went to create the programmatic atmosphere of his Symphonic Poems.
