= Mazeppa (symphonic poem) =

1851 symphonic poem by Franz Liszt

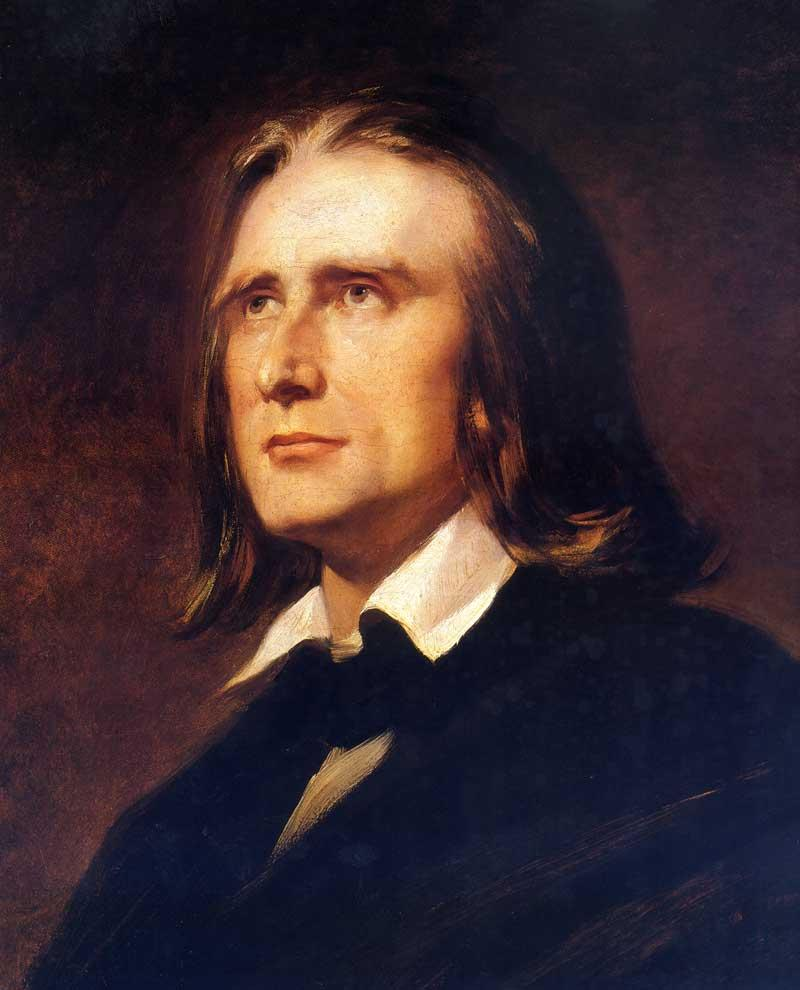
Portrait of Franz Liszt (1856) by Wilhelm von Kaulbach

Mazeppa is a symphonic poem (German: Symphonische Dichtung) composed by Franz Liszt between the years 1851 to 1854 for orchestra. Mazeppa, S. 100, is the sixth in the cycle of twelve symphonic poems written during Liszt's time in Weimar, however a thirteenth composition was added to his collection in 1882. Mazeppa is based on the poem of the same title written by Victor Hugo in 1829. Dedicated to Princess Carolyne zu Sayn-Wittgenstein, the work premiered at the Court Theatre in Weimar on 16 April 1854.

== History ==
At the age of fifteen (1826), Liszt composed twelve piano pieces titled Étude en douze exercices (Study in twelve exercises), S.136. Liszt then returned to these pieces for thematic ideas, elaborating on them considerably, in the composition of the Douze Grandes Études (Twelve Grand Studies), S.137, which were published in 1840.

Liszt later reworked the fourth étude and titled it Mazeppa, which was published in late 1846. This reimagined étude was reworked to express the elements of Victor Hugo's poem from the 1829 collection Les Orientales. Mazeppa was reworked for a final time in 1851 and the new version was given the title Transcendental Étude No. 4. The final version of the piano étude led to the orchestrated symphonic poem Mazeppa.

== Program ==
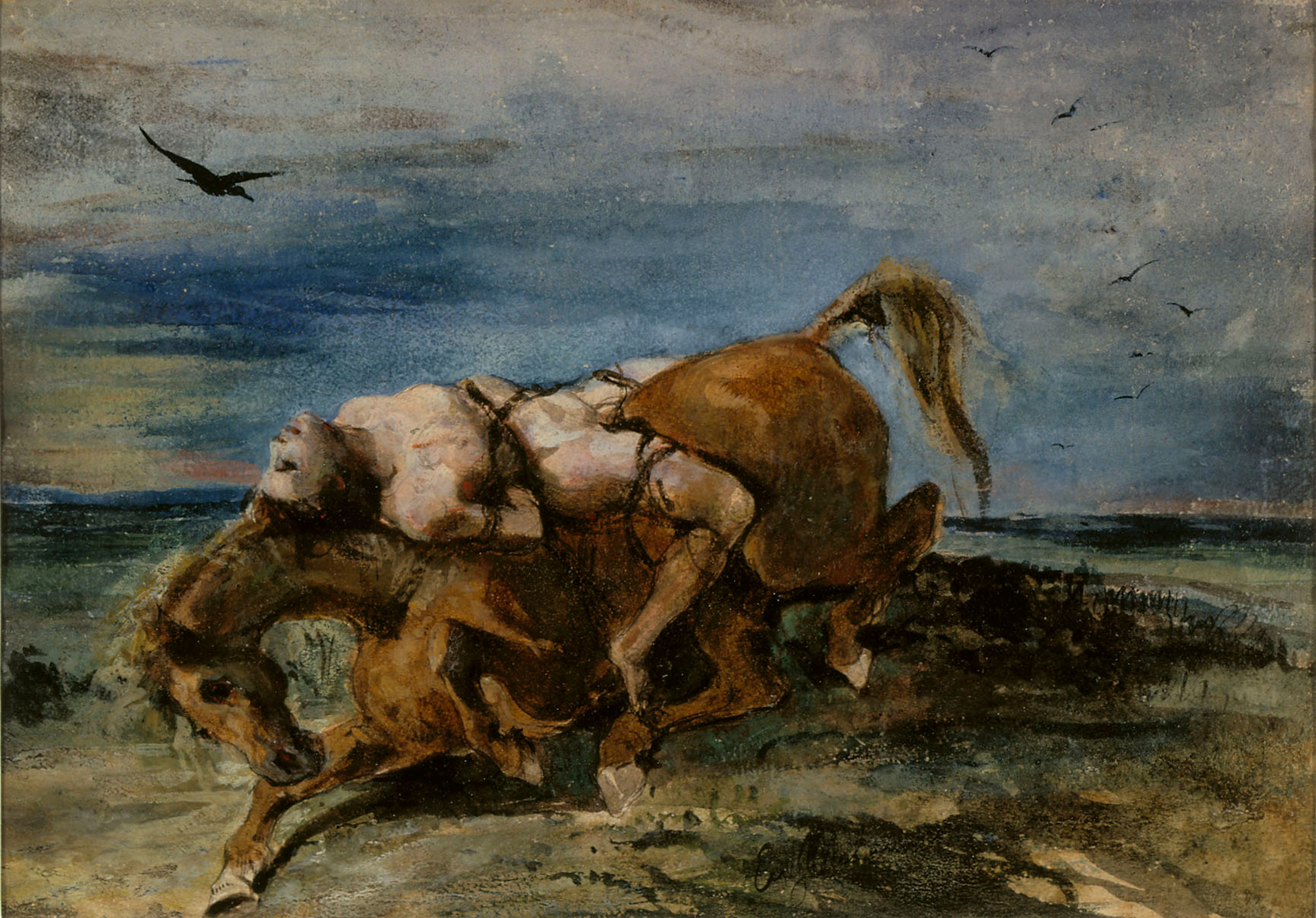
Mazeppa on the Dying Horse, Delacroix, 1824

Mazeppa was first written as an epic poem by Lord Byron in 1818, however, Liszt's Mazeppa is based upon a much shorter account written by Victor Hugo in 1829 published within a collection of poems entitled Les Orientales. Both Mazeppa writings are based on the life of Ivan Mazepa (c. 1632–1709) and Hugo's poem is included in Liszt's original manuscript.

Hugo's poem introduces Mazeppa as a Ukrainian nobleman who became a page at the court of John Casimir, King of Poland. Due to a love affair with the wife of a Podolian count, Mazeppa was punished and tied naked onto a wild horse that was violently heading toward Ukraine. The horse collapsed in death and Mazeppa was saved by Ukrainian Cossacks who then named him as their leader. Under his leadership, the Ukrainian men gained major victory in the battlefield.

== Instrumentation ==
The orchestra consists of piccolo, two flutes, two oboes, English horn, two clarinets, bass clarinet, three bassoons, four French horns, three trumpets, three trombones, tuba, timpani, bass drum, cymbals, triangle, and strings.

== Form and analysis ==
The symphonic poem is divided into two distinct sections: Mazeppa's ride (section 1) and the March (section 2). According to Liszt, it is possible to play the march, section two, without section one, the ride, as it was the material first composed for the piano piece.

Mazeppa begins similarly to the piano version, but it has an extended introduction. The composer follows Hugo's narrative, describing the hero's journey through the vast steppes in the first movement. The melodies within symphonic poems are of the highest importance, as they express the emotions experienced by the characters within the story. The string section plays a perpetuum mobile that eventually gives way to the main theme, played by the bass instruments.

This theme is developed throughout the work as Mazeppa, the character, experiences differing situations and emotions. This theme is transformed and distorted with six strokes of the timpani that evoke the fall of the rider at the end of section one, the ride. After a silence, strings, bassoon and French horn soloists express astonishment of the injured, raised by the trumpets at Allegro marziale. Mazeppa and his cossacks are placed in front of the army (a march is heard) and the return of the hero's theme signifies his end in glory.

Form divisions in Mazeppa
Section	Location	Type	Key	Program
Introduction	mm. 1–35	allegro agitato	unstable	Introduction
A	mm. 36–403	allegro agitato	D minor, B♭, B minor, return to D minor	Mazeppa's ride
B	mm. 403–435	un poco più mosso, lament	unstable	Mazeppa's ride
A'	mm. 436–558 mm. 465–499 mm. 500–558	fast, triumph march, triumph trio, funeral march	D major D minor D minor	Mazeppa's fall
Coda (finale)	mm. 559–611	triumph	D major	Mazeppa's victory

== Criticism ==
Mazeppa evoked great criticism compared to the other symphonic poems of Liszt. The Neue Wiener Musik-Zeitung, an Austrian magazine on music, published this review after a performance in Leipzig on 16 April 1857:

Mazeppa was but faintly applauded. After hearing both of these much-talked-of works with our own ears, we, also, are cured of the erroneous idea that they are something special, something we never heard before, something immense. They may be listened to very well with other things. Berlioz has made my head ache much more. People, however, must not allow themselves to be persuaded that they are music with any claims to importance, or destined to enjoy a great future.
