= Tasso: lamento e trionfo =

Symphonic poem by Franz Liszt

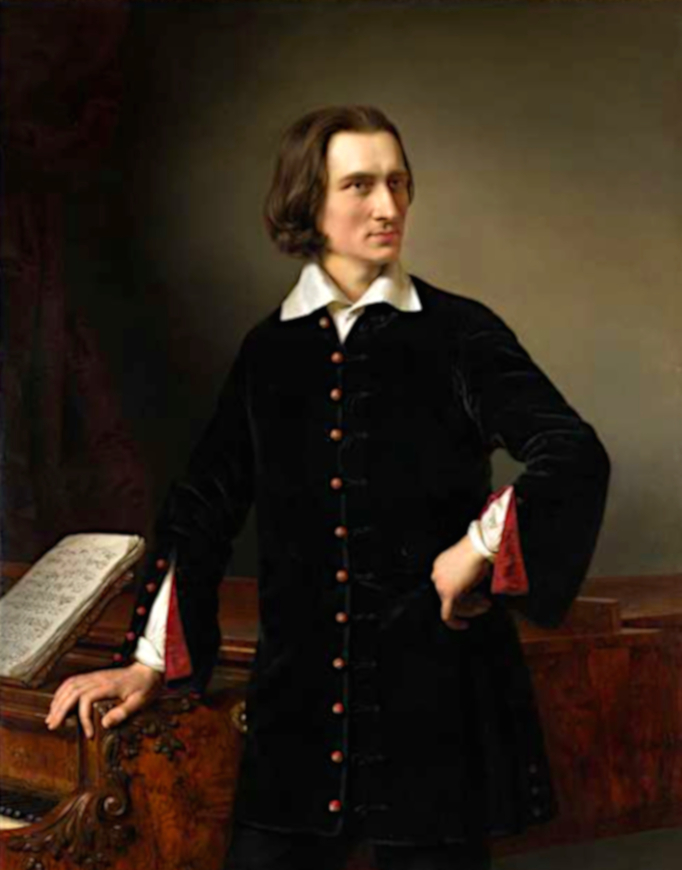
Franz Liszt, portrait by Hungarian painter Miklós Barabás, 1847

Tasso: lamento e trionfo (Tasso: Lament and Triumph), S. 96, was composed by Franz Liszt in 1849, revising it in 1850–51 and again in 1854. It is numbered No. 2 in his cycle of 13 symphonic poems written during his Weimar period.

== Overview ==
=== Composition ===
Liszt's first sketch for this work is dated August 1, 1849. He had heard the principal theme for Tasso in Venice, Italy several years earlier, however, using it in the 1840 version of his piano piece "Chant du Gondolier" in Venezia e Napoli. Liszt completed the 1849 version of Tasso as an overture in two sections, giving it to August Conradi to orchestrate. This version was performed in Weimar, Germany on the centennial of Johann Wolfgang von Goethe's birth as an overture to his drama Torquato Tasso. Liszt later corrected Conradi's score and had Joachim Raff produce a new score in 1850–51. Liszt then revised this score extensively, adding a central section. This version was performed on April 19, 1854 in Weimar, conducted by Liszt.

=== Program ===
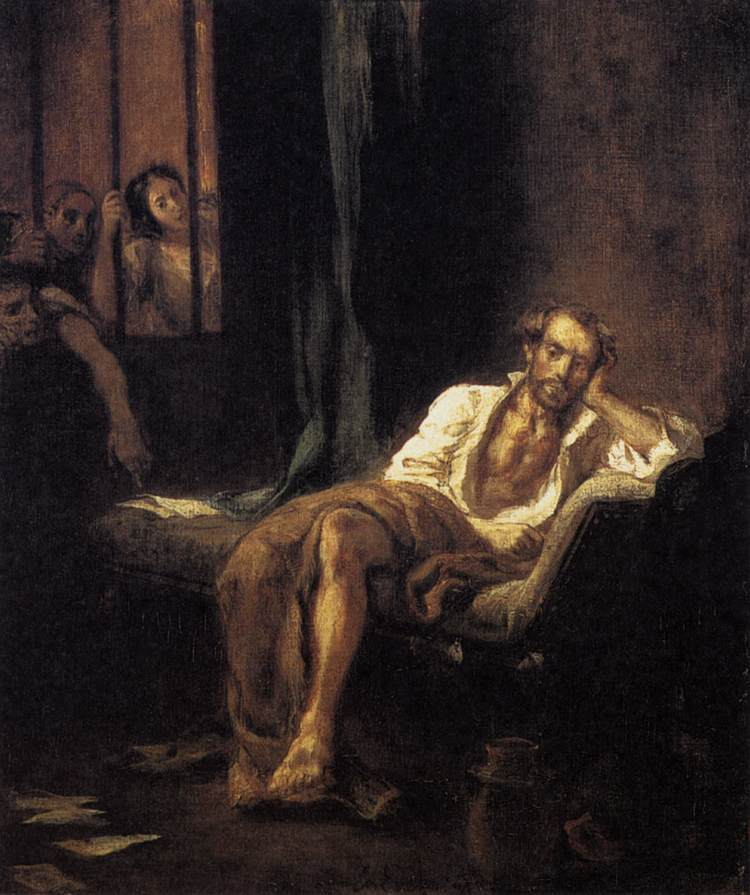
'Tasso in the Hospital of St Anne Ferrara' by Eugène Delacroix.

Goethe's portrayal of Tasso focuses primarily with his position as court poet of the Este family in Ferrara within the political intrigues of court life. Liszt, however, was more drawn to the poet's inner conflicts and the seven years he spent in St. Anna's Hospital, an insane asylum. It was actually the suffering and eventually triumphant Tasso that inspired Liszt's imagination. In his preface to Tasso, Liszt refers not only to Goethe but also to Lord Byron's poem on Tasso, even admitting to being influenced by the latter. He adds:

Tasso loved and suffered at Ferrara, he was avenged at Rome, and even today lives in the popular songs of Venice. These three moments are inseparable from his immortal fame. To reproduce them in music, we first conjured up the great shade as he wanders through the lagoons of Venice even today; then his countenance appeared to us, lofty and melancholy, as he gazes at the festivities at Ferrara, where he created his masterworks; and finally we followed him to Rome, the Eternal City, which crowned him with fame and thus pays him tribute both as martyr and as poet.

=== Instrumentation ===
This work calls for piccolo, 2 flutes, 2 oboes, 2 clarinets in B♭, bass clarinet in B♭, 2 bassoons, 4 horns in B♭ and C, 4 trumpets in C, 2 tenor trombones, bass trombone, tuba, triangle, snare drum, cymbals, bass drum, harp, and strings.

=== Structure ===
The 1849 version following a conventional overture layout, divided into a slow section ("Lament") and a fast one ("Triumph"). Even with this division, the entire work was actually a set of variations on a single melody—a folk hymn sung to Liszt by a gondolier in Venice in the late 1830s. Among the most significant revisions Liszt made was the addition of a middle section in the vein of a minuet. Calmer than either of the outer sections, it was intended to depict Tasso's more stable years in the employment of the d'Este family in Ferrara. In a margin note Liszt informs the conductor that the orchestra "assumes a dual role" in this section, with strings playing one self-contained piece while woodwinds play another. This was very much in the manner of Italian composer Pietro Raimondi, whose contrapuntal mastery was such that he had written three oratorios—titled Joseph, Potiphar and Jacob—which could be performed either individually or combined. Liszt made a study of Raimondi's work but the Italian composer died before Liszt could meet him personally.

=== Tonality ===
The Romantics considered alienation, particularly self- and social alienation, as a prominent characteristic of artistic genius. Both these forms of alienation are present in Byron's poem and according to some critics may have influenced Liszt's tonal and formal plan of Tasso, as well. The secondary theme is in E major, a relatively distant major key of a raised third in a minor-key piece. He would use this same raised-third relationship, possibly with a similar intent effectively, in both Prometheus and the Faust symphony. Tonal expectations continue to be undermined with the central minuet, written in F♯ major and tonally distant from the work's tonic, adding to a sense of disassociation.

== Use in popular culture ==
In the film Hans Christian Andersen directed by Charles Vidor, starring Danny Kaye, Farley Granger, and Zizi Jeanmaire, the music for the climatic ballet based on the writer's work "The Little Mermaid" uses large portions of Tasso, most especially when the little mermaid goes to the prince's ball.

== Bibliography ==
- ed. Hamilton, Kenneth, The Cambridge Companion to Liszt (Cambridge and New York: Cambridge University Press, 2005). ISBN 0-521-64462-3 (paperback).
  - Shulstad, Reeves, "Liszt's symphonic poems and symphonies"
- ed. Walker, Alan, Franz Liszt: The man and His Music (New York: Taplinger Publkishing Company, 1970). SBN 8008-2990-5
  - Searle, Humphrey, "The Orchestral Works"
- Walker, Alan, Franz Liszt, Volume 2: The Weimar Years, 1848–1861 (New York: Alfred A Knopf, 1989). ISBN 0-394-52540-X
