= Ce qu'on entend sur la montagne =

Symphonic poem by Franz Liszt

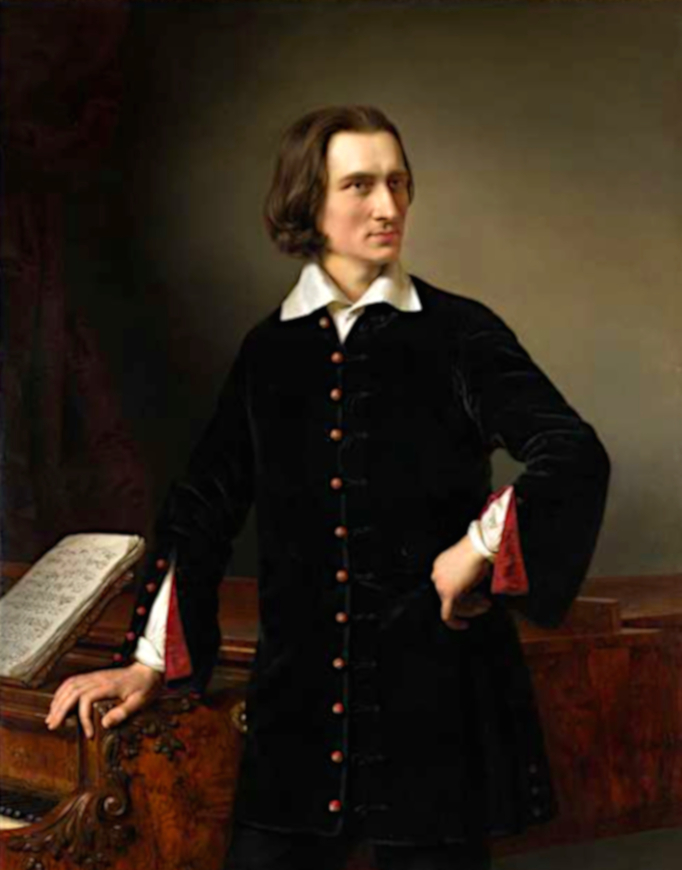
Franz Liszt, portrait by Hungarian painter Miklós Barabás, 1847

Ce qu'on entend sur la montagne, S. 95, is the first of thirteen symphonic poems by Austro-Hungarian composer Franz Liszt. It is an orchestral work inspired by Victor Hugo's poem of the same name, published as No. 5 of his collection Les Feuilles d'automne (1831).

The French title means "What one hears on the mountain". The work is sometimes referred to by its German title "Bergsymphonie" ("Mountain Symphony"). The piece, like many of Liszt's works, was revised a number of times before reaching the final version known today. It was originally composed in the years 1848–9 and subsequently revised in 1850, with the final form being produced in 1854. It is also the longest of Liszt's symphonic poems; a typical performance averages over half an hour in length.

This symphonic poem, like many of Liszt's works is largely of programmatic nature, the subject being of Nature's perfection contrasted with man's misery. Liszt writes: “The poet hears two voices; one immense, splendid, and full of order, raising to the Lord its joyous hymn of praise – the other hollow, full of pain, swollen by weeping, blasphemies, and curses. One spoke of nature, the other of humanity! Both voices struggle near to each other, cross over, and melt into one another, till finally they die away in a state of holiness.”
