= Hunnenschlacht (Liszt) =

Symphonic poem by Franz Liszt

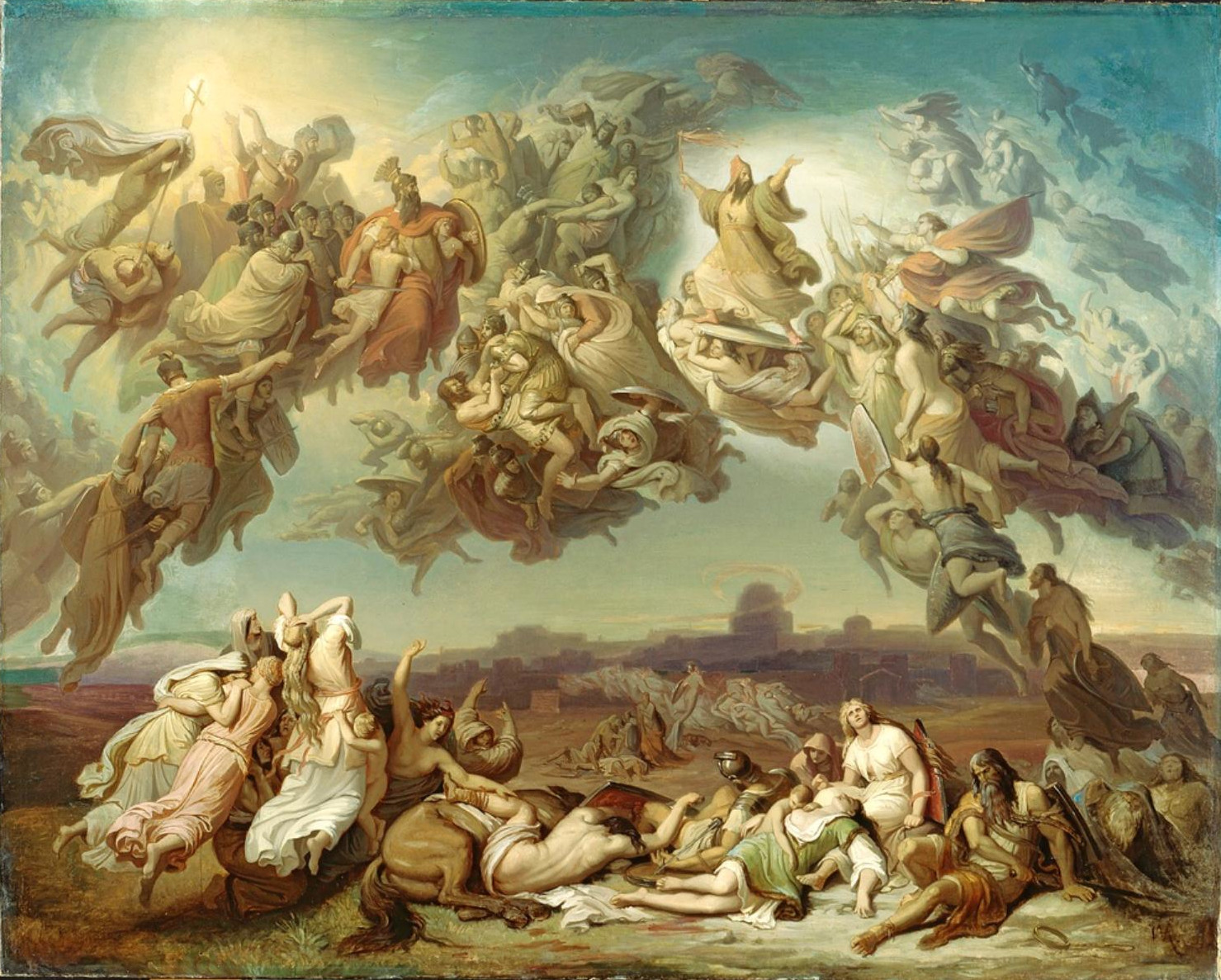
Die Hunnenschlacht, as painted by Wilhelm von Kaulbach

Hunnenschlacht (The Battle of the Huns), S.105, is a symphonic poem by Franz Liszt, written in 1857 after a painting of the same name by Wilhelm von Kaulbach. Liszt conducted the premiere himself in Weimar on 29 December 1857.

The painting depicts the battle of the Catalaunian Fields around 20 June 451 AD, where the Hun armies led by Attila fought a savage battle against a Roman coalition led by Roman General Flavius Aëtius and the Visigothic king Theodoric. According to legend, the battle was so ferocious that the souls of the dead warriors continued their fighting in the sky as they rose to Heaven.

== Structure ==
The first section of the piece, marked Tempestuoso, allegro non troppo carries Liszt's instruction: "Conductors: the entire colour should be kept very dark, and all instruments must sound like ghosts." Liszt achieves much of this effect by scoring the entire string section to play with mutes, even in fortissimo passages. This section depicts an atmosphere of foreboding and suppressed rage before the battle breaks out.

The second section, Più mosso, begins with a "Schlachtruf" (battle cry) in the horns, which is then taken up by the strings. The main battle theme is then stated, a fully formed version of material from the very opening. This entire section makes use of the so-called gypsy scale, which Liszt frequently used in his Hungarian-themed compositions. In this section Liszt introduces an unusual effect: against the current of the raucous battle music in the rest of the orchestra, the trombones play the ancient plainchant melody "Crux fidelis". Liszt's own description of this section was of "two opposing streams of light in which the Huns and the Cross are moving."

The "Crux fidelis" theme is later taken up by the strings in a quiet, peaceful contrasting section. The music grows in intensity, eventually including an organ and offstage brass section, and it ends triumphantly.
