= Prometheus (Liszt) =

Symphonic poem by Franz Liszt

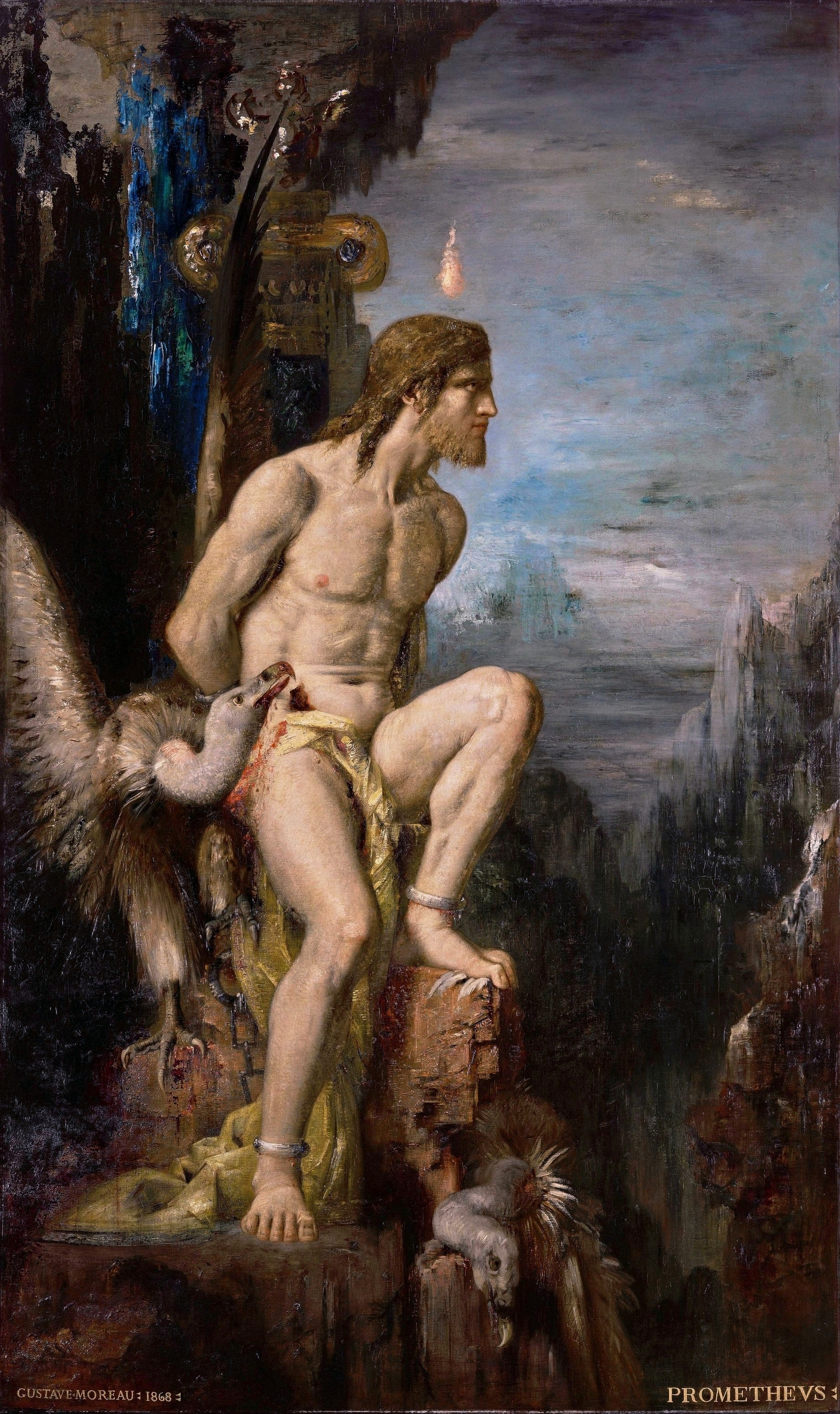
Prometheus, by Gustave Moreau

Franz Liszt composed his Prometheus in 1850, numbering it No. 5 in his cycle of symphonic poems when he revised it in 1855. The work is based on the Greek myth detailing the Titan Prometheus' theft of fire from the gods and is numbered S.99 in the Searle catalogue.

== Overview ==
=== Composition ===
In 1850, Franz Liszt composed an overture and eight choruses with orchestra accompaniment for Johann Gottfried Herder's Der entfesselte Prometheus (Prometheus Unbound), a mythological work of thirteen scenes meant as a sequel to Aeschylus's Prometheus Bound. This was to be performed for the Herder Festival scheduled for August of that year in Weimar. Liszt gave indications for the orchestration, and from these notes Liszt's helper Joachim Raff produced a score which was used in the first performance. This concert commemorated the unveiling of a monument to Herder on 24 August 1850. In 1855 Liszt revised both the overture and the choruses, added new instruments, mainly woodwinds, which resulted in the expansion of the overture to a symphonic poem and the choruses to a concert stage work. The symphonic poem was first performed on 18 October 1855.

=== Description ===
The work that was composed to illustrate the imprisonment, pain, hope, and the final triumph of Prometheus turned out to be incomprehensible to the contemporary public because of the many dissonances in the music. The choral parts ended too soon and were unusable, but the overture acquired its own life as a symphonic poem thanks to many performances of it by conductor Hans von Bülow.

For the performance of the revised choruses, Weimar critic Richard Pohl condensed Herder's work into prologues to be read before each chorus. Unlike Herder's allegorical text, Pohl's prologues develop Prometheus' character, emphasizing both his sufferings and his turbulent relationship with Zeus. They also create an intensity not present in Herder's drama, which carries over into the symphonic poem, from the furious opening (marked Allegro energico ed adagio assai) to the principal musical material (marked Allegro molto appassionato).

== Transcriptions ==
As with the other symphonic poems written during the Weimar period, Prometheus was also transcribed for piano four-hands and two pianos. Additionally, the organist and composer Jean Guillou has transcribed Prometheus for organ solo.

== Discography ==
- Prometheus, the myth in music

Berlin Philharmonic directed by Claudio Abbado,
label SONY Classical, SK 53978-2
live recording from 4 October 1994.

- Liszt, Symphonic Poems

the symphonic orchestra of Polskie Radio, directed by Michael Hálasz
label Naxos 8.550487
recorded 2–6 April 1991

- Liszt, A Faust Symphony, A Dante Symphony, Les Preludes, Prometheus, (2CD)

London Philharmonic Orchestra directed by Sir Georg Solti
label Decca, 466751
recorded 13 June 1977

== Bibliography ==
- ed. Hamilton, Kenneth, The Cambridge Companion to Liszt (Cambridge and New York: Cambridge University Press, 2005). ISBN 0-521-64462-3 (paperback).
  - Shulstad, Reeves, "Liszt's symphonic poems and symphonies"
- ed. Walker, Alan, Franz Liszt: The man and His Music (New York: Taplinger Publkishing Company, 1970). SBN 8008–2990–5
  - Searle, Humphrey, "The Orchestral Works"
- Walker, Alan, Franz Liszt, Volume 2: The Weimar Years, 1848–1861 (New York: Alfred A Knopf, 1989). ISBN 0-394-52540-X

== Additional sources ==
- Müller-Reuter, Theodor. Lexikon der deutschen Konzertliteratur. Leipzig: C.F. Kahnt, 1909
- Raff, Helene. "Franz Liszt und Joachim Raff im Spiegel ihrer Briefe." Die Musik. 1901–1902
- Paul Allen Bertagnolli. "From overture to symphonic poem, from melodrama to choral cantata: studies of the sources for Franz Liszt’s Prometheus and his Chöre zu Herder's Entfesseltem Prometheus" (Ph.D. Dissertation, Washington University, 1998).

== See also ==
- Franz Liszt
- Symphonic poem
