= Marche funèbre (disambiguation) =

Marche funèbre (French: funeral march) may refer to:

- Funeral march
- Marche funèbre (Chopin), a section of Frédéric Chopin's Piano Sonata No. 2 in B-flat minor
- Marche Funèbre (EP), EP by Soap&Skin
