= Embryons desséchés =

1913 piano composition by Erik Satie

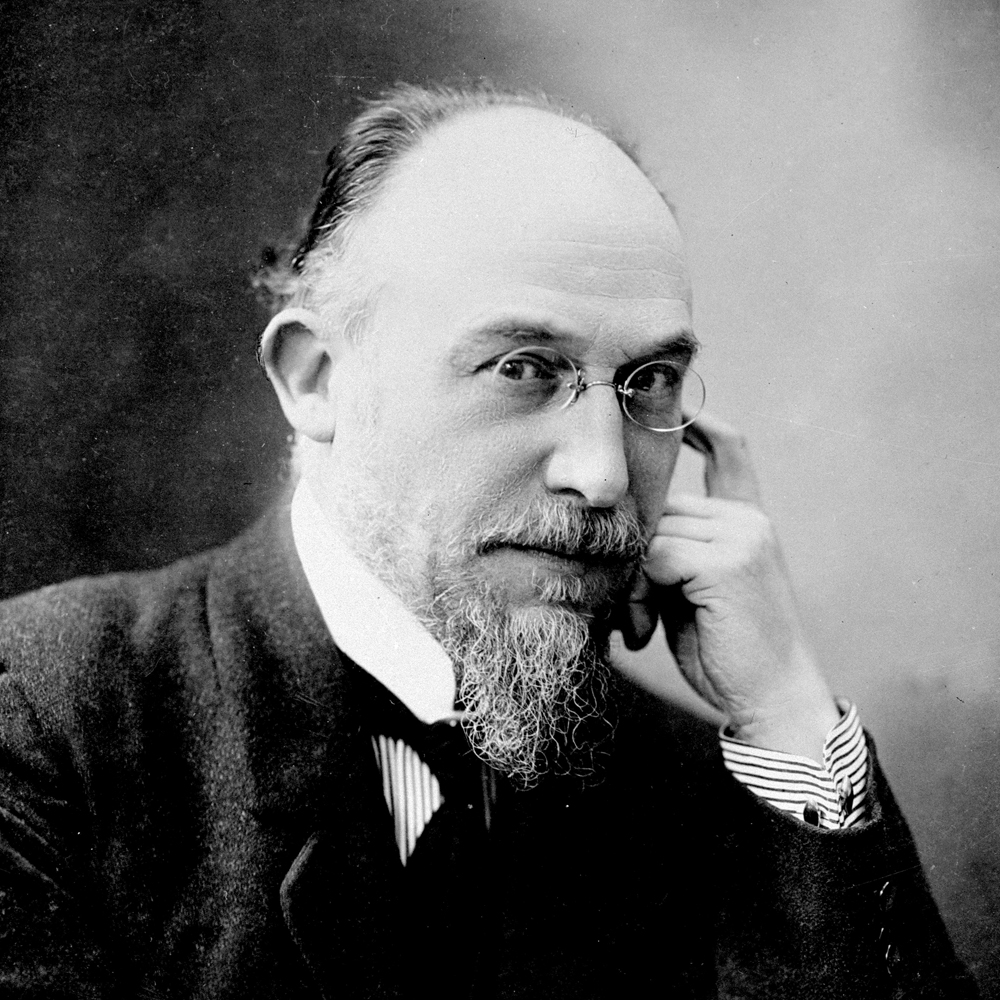
Erik Satie

Embryons desséchés ("Desiccated embryos") is a piano composition by Erik Satie, composed in the summer of 1913. The composition consists of three little movements, each taking about two to three minutes to play.

== The music ==
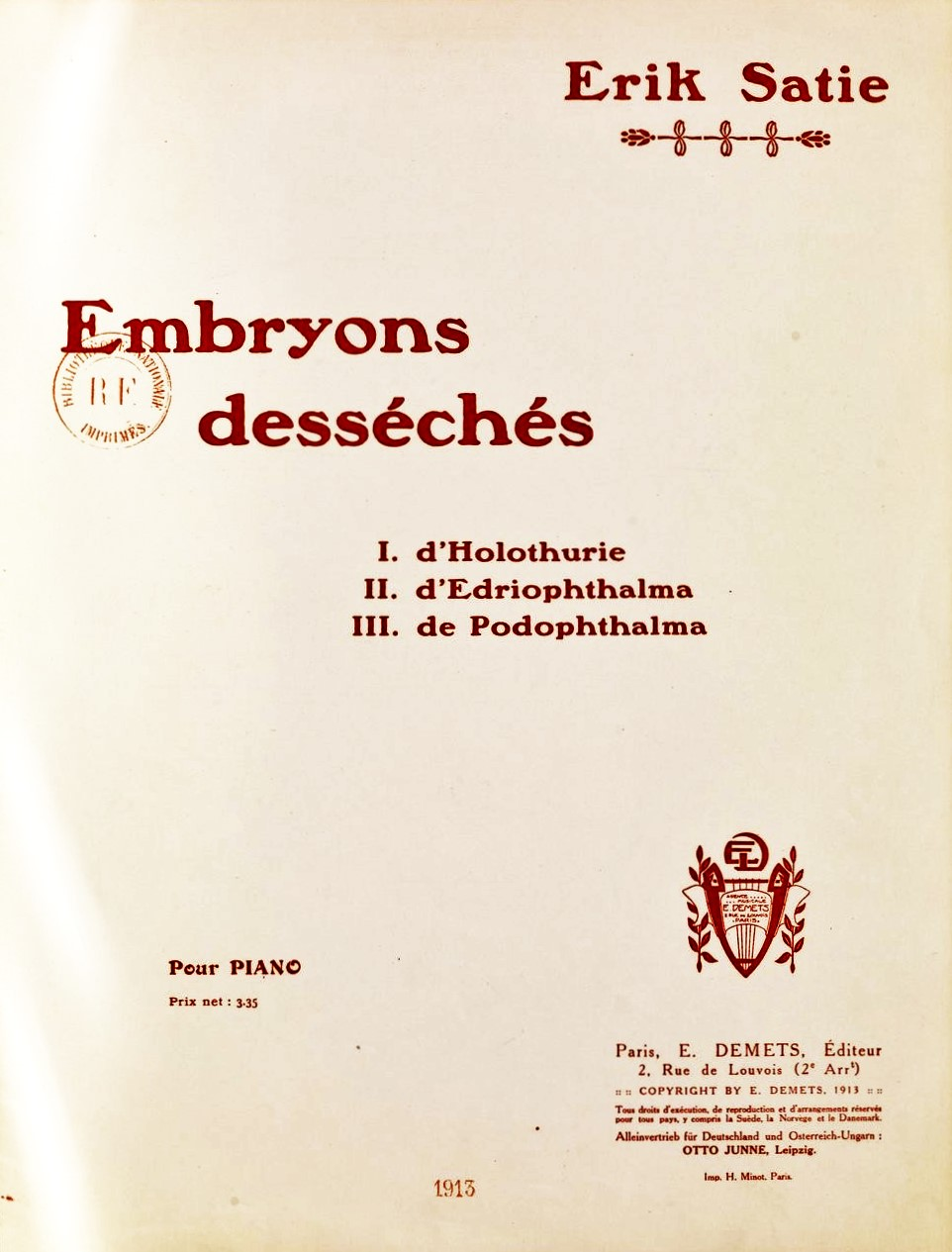
Cover of the original edition of Satie's Embryons desséchés (1913)

The parts of the composition are:

1. (Desiccated embryo) of a Holothurian (30 June 1913), dedicated to Suzanne Roux:

- See: sea cucumber. This type of animal has no eyes.
- The music of this first part of the composition concentrates on the so-called "purring" of the holothurian, besides making fun of Loïsa Puget's song Mon rocher de Saint-Malo ("My rock of Saint-Malo" – a then popular salon composition, which Satie had probably played numerous times in his cabaret pianist career). That this song is intended is already suggested by the introduction: Satie writes above the score, "[...] I observed a Holothurian in the bay of Saint-Malo." Further he writes following remarks in the score, when "quoting" the melody of the song: "What a nice rock!" and the second time: "That was a nice rock! How sticky!". Going submarine in a bay in Brittany, might also have been a wink from Satie to his (former) friend Debussy: three years earlier this composer had published the piano piece La cathédrale engloutie (Préludes, book I, No. 10), alluding to the legendary city of Ys, submersed in a bay in Brittany. There's even a reproach implied: as friends, they had renounced romanticism in the late 19th century: since, Debussy apparently had turned to romanticised myths about submersed cities and the like, as a subject for his compositions. Satie's statement is clear: he had remained true to himself, taking as subject for his composition something "he had seen with his own eyes".

2. (Desiccated embryo) of an Edriophthalma (1 July 1913), dedicated to Edouard Dreyfus:

- Edriophthalma, also known as Arthrostraca, are crustaceans with immobile eyes. In more modern taxonomies they belong to sub-groups of the Tetradecapoda (i.e. fourteen-legged crustaceans), e.g. Amphipoda (several kinds of usually small shrimp), and Isopoda (see e.g. this giant isopod or these woodlice).
- It is not clear whether Satie had in mind any of these animals in particular, or that he just wanted to make reference to this group of crustaceans in general, for their "underdog"-like qualities (which he describes as subdue and morose in the score). In this part of the composition he makes fun of Frédéric Chopin's Funeral March from his Piano Sonata No. 2 in B-flat minor (by the way calling it a "famous mazurka by Schubert". In fact, Schubert composed no mazurkas).

3. (Desiccated embryo) of a Podophthalma (4 July 1913), dedicated to Jane Mortier:

- Podophthalmia are stalk-eyed crustaceans, like crabs and lobsters (and various types of mostly larger shrimp), now grouped as Decapoda (i.e. ten-legged crustaceans).
- In the score, Satie mentions the "hunter"-like qualities of podophthalmia, so the music is conceived as a miniature hunt. Hunts are a tradition in classical music, from early baroque keyboard music, over Vivaldi, several classical era composers and romantic opera composers to César Franck. Nonetheless, in music a hunting sea animal can be considered one of a kind.
- Satie also points out that podophthalmia are delicious food: he was particularly fond of this kind of sea-food himself.
- Satie concludes his triptych with a coda marked, "Obligatory cadenza (by the composer.)" Consisting, as it does, of more than half a page of fortissimo F-major chords and arpeggios, this grandiose flourish is incongruous with the modest proportions of the piece as a whole. It appears to be a pastiche of the end of Beethoven's Eighth Symphony, and of Beethoven's style, the "endless coda".

== Orchestral version ==
Composer/conductor Friedrich Cerha orchestrated Embryons desséchés for a 1970 recording of Satie's orchestral music (CE 31018) by his ensemble, "Die Reihe." This performance of Embryons desséchés features an actress reciting the narratives from Satie's original score synchronously with the music, even though the composer disapproved of such a practice.

== The crustaceans ==
In the 20th century both Edriophthalma and Podophthalmia would become classified in the Malacostraca class of the Crustacea subphylum of the Arthropoda phylum; the use of the terms Edriophthalma and Podophthalmia became obsolete with regard to the taxonomy of crustaceans.

As to the sources Satie might have had to make references to Podophthalmia and Edriophthalmata: in early evolutionary biology these crustaceans (and notably also their embryos) were studied by Fritz Müller, in his book Facts and Arguments for Darwin, published in German in 1863, and available in English in 1869. The images below are taken from the Project Gutenberg publication of that book (E-text N° 6475):

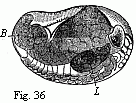

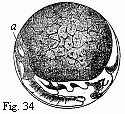

From Chapter 8 — Developmental History of Edriophthalma:
- Figure 36. Embryo of Ligia in the egg, magnified 15 diam. B. yelk; L. liver.
- Figure 38. Embryo of a Philoscia in the egg, magnified 25 diam.
- Figure 39. Embryo of Cryptoniscus planarioides, magnified 90 diam.
- Figure 43. Embryo of a Corophium, magnified 90 diam.
From Chapter 7 — Developmental History of Podophthalma:
- FIGURE 34. Embryo of a Squilla, magnified 45 diam. a. heart.

The book also shows other development stages of these animals (zoea, larva), even odder in shape.
