= In memoriam (Sibelius) =

Funeral march by Jean Sibelius

- Funeral march by Jean Sibelius
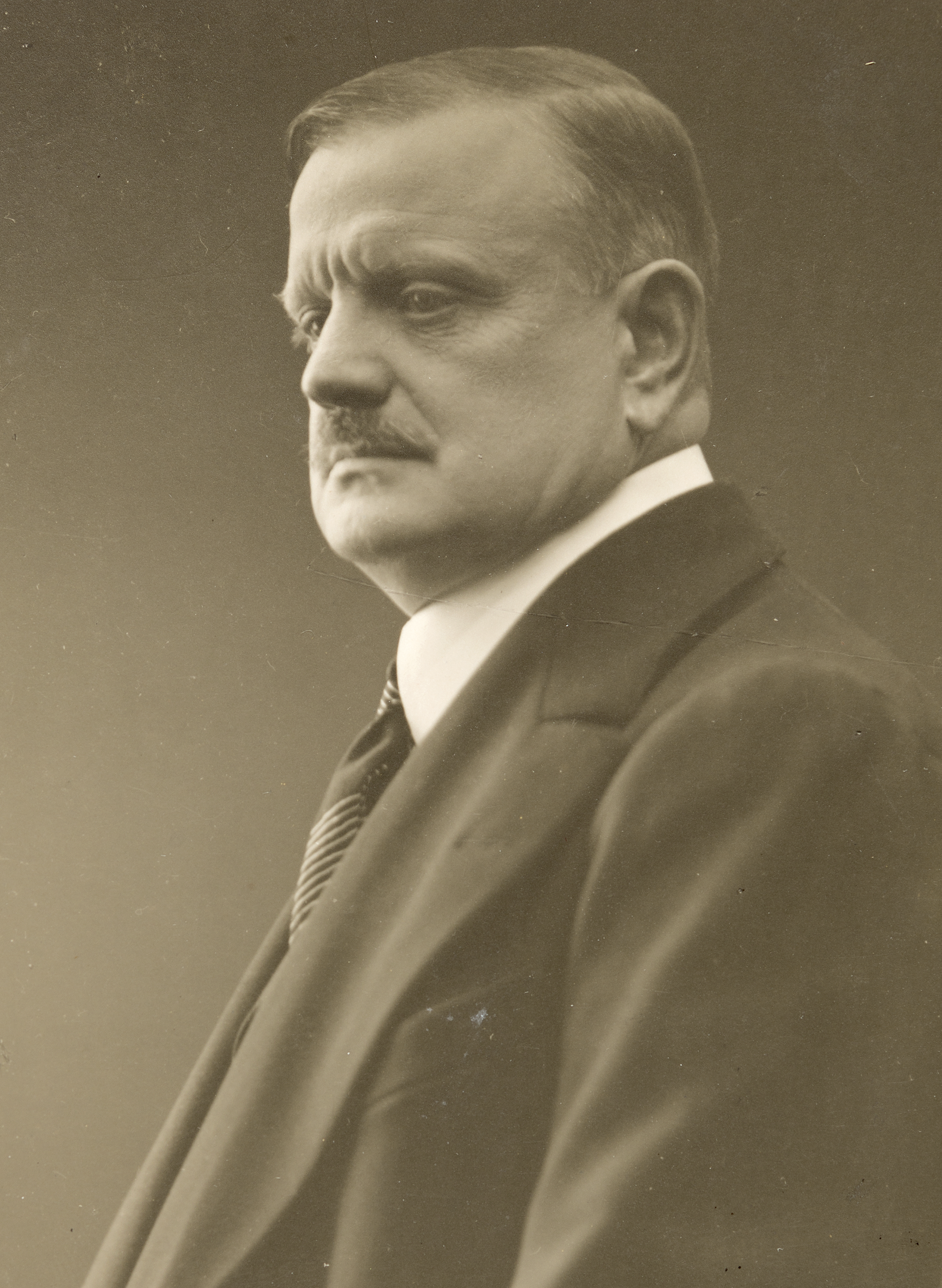
- The composer (c. 1911)
- Opus: 59
- Composed: 1909, rev. 1910
- Publisher: Breitkopf & Härtel (1910)
- Duration: 9 mins. (orig. 10 mins.)

Premiere
- Date: 8 October 1910
- Location: Kristiania, Norway
- Conductor: Jean Sibelius
- Performers: Kristiania Musical Association

In memoriam, Op. 59, is a single-movement funeral march for orchestra written in 1909 by the Finnish composer Jean Sibelius. It was written in memory of Eugen Schauman. However, he revised the piece in 1910. He conducted the first performance in Kristiania (now Oslo) on 8 October 1910. The piece was also performed at his own funeral.

== History ==
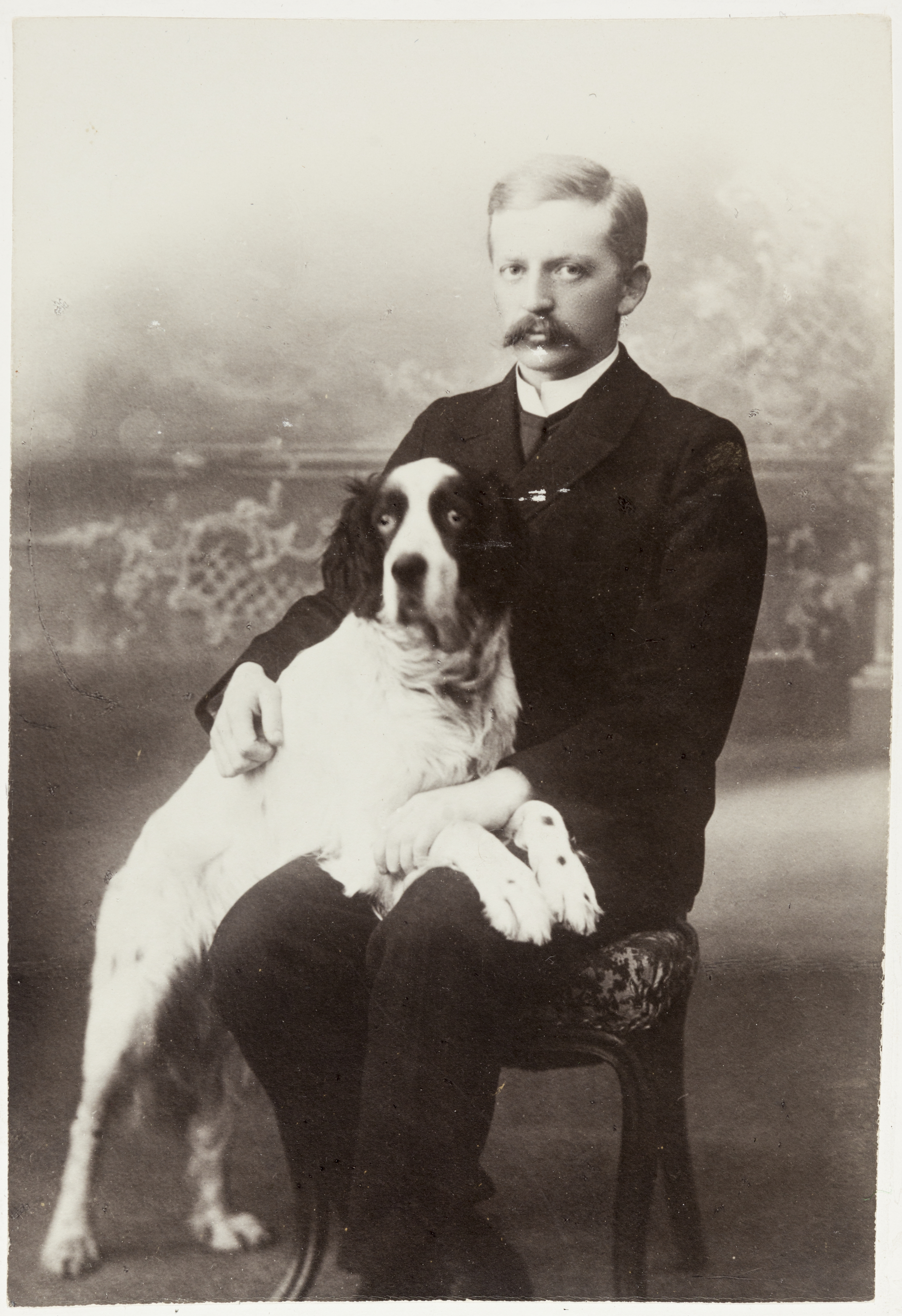
Eugen Schauman, in whose memory the work was conceived

The work was written to commemorate Eugen Schauman who had in 1904 shot Governor-General Nikolay Bobrikov and then killed himself. Sibelius mentioned on New Year's Day of 1905 "that he intended to write a requiem in memory of Eugen Schauman and that he had already started to work on it. – I just hope it will be worthy of its subject matter! After all, it will be the only monument that we can raise for him!"

Only in 1909, after his throat surgery which made him think of death, he returned to the idea. Erik Tawaststjerna assumes that he wrote it also for himself. He composed a first version in 1909, completed on 14 December 1909. His models were the funeral marches of Beethoven's Symphony No. 3 "Eroica" and Wagner's Götterdämmerung. The work in sonata form is introduced by the violins and violas, with a main theme developing "like the approach of a distant cortege". He sent the work to the publisher Breitkopf.

Reading the proofs, Sibelius was not satisfied, especially with the instrumentation. He revised the piece, completing the work in March 1910. Sibelius first performed it on 8 October 1910, played by the Musikforeningen, in concerts in Kristiania, Norway.

In memoriam was played at the funeral of Sibelius in 1957.

== Instrumentation ==
In its revised form, In memoriam is scored for the following instruments, organized by family (woodwinds, brass, percussion, and strings):

- 2 flutes, 2 oboes, 1 cor anglais, 2 clarinets (in A), 1 bass clarinet (in B♭), 2 bassoons, and 1 contrabassoon
- 4 horns (in F), 3 trumpets (in B♭), 3 trombones, and 1 tuba
- Timpani, bass drum, snare drum, and cymbals
- Violins (I and II), violas, cellos, and double basses

The original version of the piece called for 1 piccolo in addition to the orchestra forces above.

== Discography ==
The British conductor Sir Thomas Beecham and the London Philharmonic Orchestra made the world premiere studio recording of In memoriam in 1938 for His Master's Voice. The table below lists this and other commercially available recordings:

No.	Conductor	Ensemble	Rec. (Note: Refers to the year in which the performers recorded the work; this may not be the same as the year in which the recording was first released to the general public.)	Time	Recording venue	Label	Ref.
1	Sir Thomas Beecham	London Philharmonic Orchestra	1938	9:03		Koch	(Note: [ T. Beecham—Koch (3–7061–2 H1) 1991])
2	Jussi Jalas	Hungarian State Symphony Orchestra	c. 1975	8:51	[Unknown], Budapest	Decca	(Note: J. Jalas–Decca (482 331–1))
3	Neemi Järvi	Gothenburg Symphony Orchestra	1986	7:57	Gothenburg Concert Hall	BIS	(Note: N. Järvi–BIS (CD–372) 1987)
4	Atso Almila	Kuopio Symphony Orchestra	1998	8:48	Kuopio Music Centre	Finlandia	(Note: A. Almila–Finlandia (3984–23391–2) 1999)
5	Leif Segerstam (1)	Danish National Symphony Orchestra	1990	13:38	Danish Radio Concert Hall (old)	Chandos	(Note: L. Segerstam–Chandos (CHAN 9107) 1992)
6	Osmo Vänskä (1)	Lahti Symphony Orchestra (1)	2000	11:21	Sibelius Hall	BIS	(Note: O. Vänskä–BIS (CD–1485) 2006)
†	Osmo Vänskä (2)	Lahti Symphony Orchestra (2)	2004	10:25	Sibelius Hall	BIS	
7	Leif Segerstam (2)	Turku Philharmonic Orchestra	2014	13:15	Turku Concert Hall	Naxos	(Note: L. Segerstam–Naxos (8.573340) 2015)

† = original version (1904)
