= Funeral march =

Musical genre

A funeral march (marche funèbre in French, marcia funebre in Italian, Trauermarsch in German, marsz żałobny in Polish), as a musical genre, is a march, usually in a minor key, in a slow "simple duple" metre, imitating the solemn pace of a funeral procession. Some such marches are often considered appropriate for use during funerals and other sombre occasions, the best-known example being the third movement of Chopin's Piano Sonata No. 2. Handel uses the name dead march, also used for marches played by a military band at military funerals.

== History ==
=== Historical origins ===
The custom of accompanying the solemn funeral procession with instrumental music was already present in ancient civilizations in various forms. Both the Greeks and the Etruscans usually employed flute players or, the latter, zither players, as can be deduced for example from the Chiusi cippi illustrated in Pericle Ducati's work. Among the Romans, the traditional funeral (funus translaticium) involved the presence of musicians at the opening of the procession: two cornicini, four tibicini and a lituus, a special trumpet with a soft sound that was well suited to the circumstances. There is sculptural evidence of this ritual in a funerary bas-relief from Amiternum.

=== 17th century ===
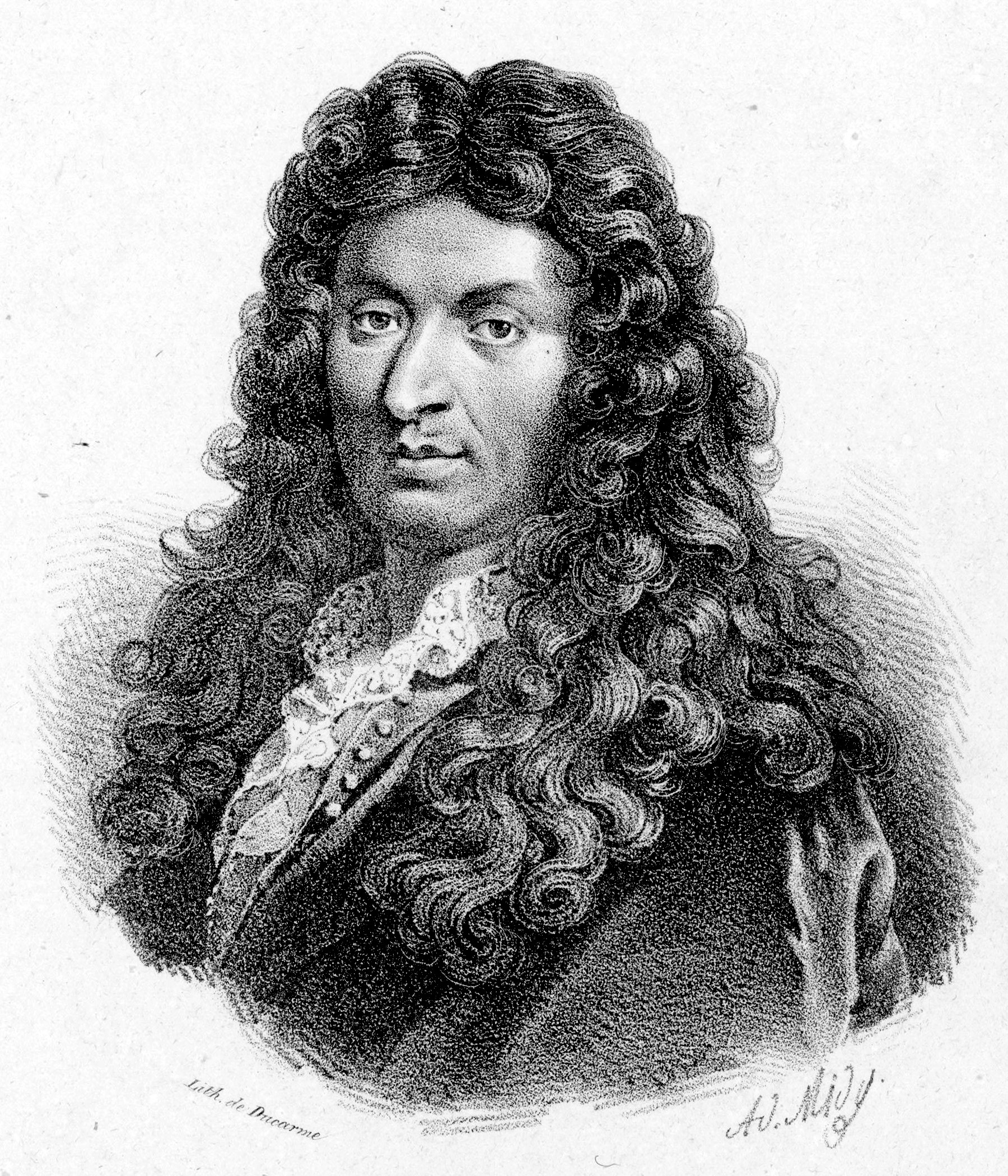
Lully codified the military march form and used a funeral march in an opera or tragédie lyrique.

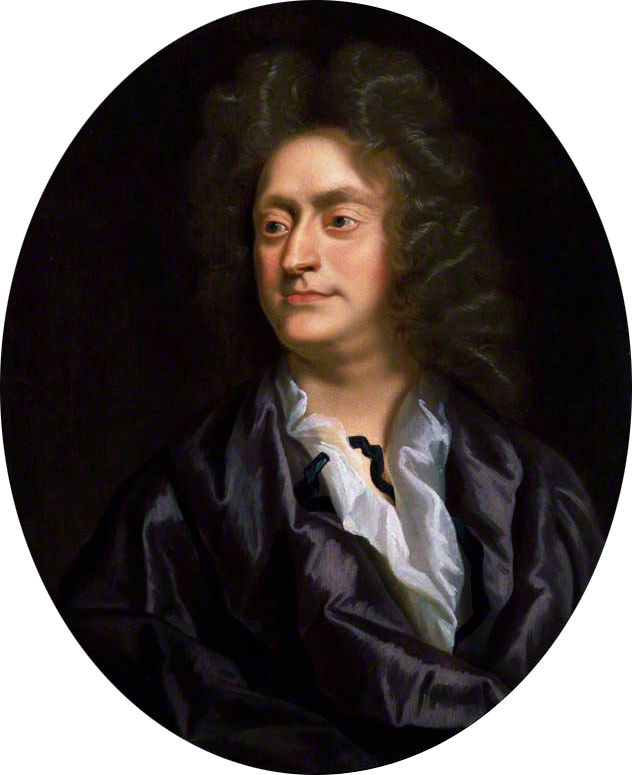
Purcell composed one of the oldest known examples of a funeral march composed specifically for the funeral of a powerful person.

The genesis of the funeral march dates back to the seventeenth century. Originally it belongs to the group of solemn processional marches, military and non-military, and was intended only for practical use in the funerals of illustrious figures. However, already in 1674 Jean-Baptiste Lully used his Pompe funèbre in his opera Alceste.

Other ancient funeral marches, however intended for their own use, are the marches taken from Purcell 's Music for the Funeral of Queen Mary (1694), composed for the funeral of Mary II of England (5 March 1695), and the March to the Dauphin's Funeral Home written for Maria Anna of Bavaria and attributed to Philidor the Elder around 1690.

=== 18th century ===
The eighteenth century was relatively scarce with funeral marches, both in military repertoires and in the works of great composers, but it still produced notable examples and, above all, freed the genre from its ceremonial function.

If in the early years of the century Philidor still composed a Marche funèbre pour le convoi du Roy (1715) for the solemn funeral of Louis XIV, twenty years later we remember the Dead marches written by Handel for the Saul oratorios (1738) and Samson (1742). The first is identified in England with the funeral march par excellence and remained in use in funerals until the twentieth century.

The rituals of Freemasonry contributed to the development of the genre at the end of the century. An early example is Giroust 's cantata Le déluge (1784), composed to commemorate a free-mason of the Paris lodge. Even Mozart 's Maurerische Trauermusik (1785), an original composition that combines the cantus firmus with a march and presents various characteristics similar to those of the funeral march, is dedicated to the memory of two Freemasons. This famous Trauermusik is preceded by a Kleiner Trauermarsch (1784) which seems to anticipate its content.

The French Revolution replaced the Requiem Mass with the funeral procession with its triumph being the procession to the Pantheon as for Rouseau in 1994, in what used to be the Roman Catholic church of Sainte-Genevieve in Paris. It is at this moment that the funeral march established itself to the detriment of the requiem as a secular model of funeral music, intended as much for witnesses of civil virtue as for military heroes. Civil celebrations become an essential moment of the new religion of reason, inspiring hymns and other compositions suitable for various occasions, including funerals.

The lacerating Lugubrious March composed by Francois-Joseph Gossec to celebrate the victims of an anti-royalist uprising on 20 September 1790 known as the Nancy affair which marked a decisive turning point. Performed on the Champ de Mars in memory of the fallen soldiers, it aroused great emotion and sets the standard for the nineteenth-century funeral march. The piece was repeated at Mirabeau 's solemn funeral on 4 April 1791. On this occasion, the use of the large drum was particularly striking, appearing for the first time in a musical composition and marking the procession with a sense of fatality. The Italians Cherubini and Paisiello also composed funeral marches for the death of General Hoche in 1797 after he had spilled a lot of blood during the Revolution.

=== 19th century ===
==== Beethoven and the heroic funeral march ====

Beethoven's Eroica funeral march is one of the first great works of its kind.

At the beginning of the nineteenth century, Beethoven adhered to the ideals of the Revolution and borrowed the theme of heroic death from the composers of the revolutionary era, from which he drew inspiration in several works destined to reverberate their influence on the work of romantic. The Funeral March on the Death of a Hero (1800-1801) which is the third movement of the Piano Sonata no. 12, one of the most popular of the century, would have a notable influence on Chopin in particular.

Beethoven was looking for the "new musical paths" (Neue Bahnen) mentioned in one of his letters to Krumpholz of 1802. In this period the maestro from Bonn frequented the funeral march genre several times: for example, the fifth of the Six Variations in F major for piano op. 34 (1799).

But what is of greatest importance is the second movement of the Eroica (1802-1804) which, in addition to innovating the very way of conceiving the central slow tempo of the symphony form, definitively frees the funeral march from functionality to practical use, drawing from it a pure concert piece. The funeral march of the Eroica was not very suitable for use in processions, unlike that of the Sonata n. 12, which remains the only movement of his own sonata orchestrated by Beethoven and which was performed at the composer's funeral on 29 March 1827.

However, alongside the Beethovenian epic genre, different other tendencies emerge. The funeral march that opens the finale of the second act in Rossini's Gazza ladra (1819) (Infelice, sventurata) is renowned throughout the nineteenth century and heralds a new turning point in the evolution of the genre, introducing a previously unknown melodic lyricism. The fifth of Schubert 's Six grandes marches en trio (1824) is in the same vein though it is not indicated by the author as a funeral march but so called in his obituaries and in a piano transcription by Liszt.

In terms of instrumentation, after the first decades of the century the orchestral workforce expanded. Percussions other than timpani, which had so much weight in band performances at the time of the Revolution, also made their debut in the orchestra: in the 1840s, those percussions were fully integrated in the compositions of Berlioz, Donizetti, Wagner.

Romanticism, fascinated by funeral music, further deepened the significance of the composition, using it in chamber music, in the symphony, in the sonata, in opera. At the same time, however, a vast literature of compositions for wind orchestra conceived as tribute and performed at funerals also flourished.

==== Chopin and the romantic funeral march ====
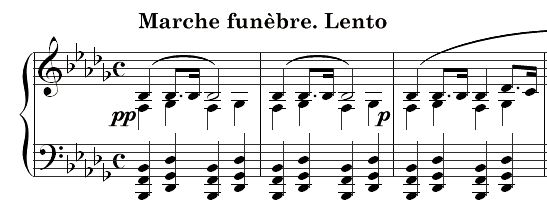
Opening of the Marche funèbre

III. Marche funèbre, Lento
Andreas Xenopoulos, piano

The attraction for funeral music was especially intense for Chopin, who knew well the Sonata No. 12 by Beethoven; as a matter of fact, he usually exploited its elements in other compositions. Many examples are certainly familiar to him when he sets out to compose the famous piece around which he would build the entire Sonata No. 2 Op. 35 (1839). In addition to the works of Beethoven and Rossini, the Polish composer almost certainly knew the first movement of Berlioz's Great Funeral and Triumphal Symphony before its official debut in 1840, but it possesses a very different character and in all likelihood represents a model negative.

The funeral marches were performed only an official function, it had almost no theme, the melody was chaste and sinister, the whole structure was oriented towards the solemn celebration. In Chopin's funeral march, the central section in a major mode trio presents a theme that is not only complete, but that can be counted among the melodic peaks reached by the author in all of his production.

In Chopin the funeral march abdicates public solemnity to include a moment of private meditation. Compared to Beethoven, the heroic and glorious dimension has been completely lost: the Chopin trio rather expresses a defeat, for some a prayer, for others only profound sadness, in a humanization of death which has certainly contributed to the popularity of the piece. It is a difficult passage to interpret, not surprisingly criticized and even repudiated as "abominable" by Bülow, or instead considered a "touchstone" of the pianist's sensitivity such as Wilhelm von Lenz.

At Chopin's funeral on 30 October 1849, the piece was performed in an orchestral transcription, entrusted to Reber with Meyerbeer's regret. It is just one of the countless transcriptions for band or orchestra that have contributed to extending the composition's fame.

Throughout the twentieth century and into the twenty-first century Chopin's funeral march has been the best-known in the world, and also the most famous of Chopin's works. It was orchestrated among others by Elgar (who transposes it from B♭ to D minor) and by Stokowski, and is often performed at state funerals, for example those of John F. Kennedy (25 November 1963), Sir Winston Churchill (30 January 1965), Leonid Brezhnev (15 November 1982), Margaret, Baroness Thatcher (17 April 2013), and Elizabeth II (19 September 2022). John Philip Sousa testifies that in Australia in 1910 his transcription for band thrilled the audience to the point that it was necessary to repeat it at the next concert.

==== Liszt and the romantic funeral march ====
The fascination with death then emerged from Liszt 's theme and also took on a personal dimension in the Three Funeral Odes, including The Night (1863-1864), a funeral march dedicated to the memory of his daughter Blandine. Liszt in turn referred to Beethoven, whose funeral march from the Eroica he transcribed for the piano.

The characteristics of the funeral march are found in various symphonic poems such as Tasso (1854), Die Ideale (1857), Hamlet (1858), Héroïde funèbre (1849-1850), Hungaria (1854), where the Hungarian composer deals with both death and mourning itself, and death as a prelude to rebirth. In the last two poems cited the reference to the funeral march is explicit in the time indication .

Liszt's funeral marches or pseudo-marches are characterized by their extreme slowness. Liszt relies particularly on dark timbres and low registers, providing expressive indications such as expressive dolente, feeble, lachrymoso, lamentative, lugubrious, crying. In some cases Hamlet and Hungaria) the one to the funeral march is a simple allusion conveyed by a theme in march time, while in others the composition receives a complete form and includes a trio. Another passage from the Years of Pilgrimage (1867) is dedicated to Maximilian I of Mexico, the emperor of the house of Habsburg executed by the republican troops of Benito Juarez.

==== Mahler and the symphonic funeral march ====
Towards the end of the century, the funeral march played an important symbolic role in Gustav Mahler's production, starting with the romance Die zwei blauen Augen (1884) taken from the Lieder eines fahrenden Gesellen. The composer uses it indifferently in the symphonies (third movement of the first and first of the fifth), in the Lieder and in the collections of the latter.

In the second volume of the collection Des Knaben Wunderhorn, which had a great influence on the first four symphonies and which stood out for the extreme nature of the emotions addressed, the echo of Die zwei blauen Augen stands out, melodically recalled by Nicht wiedersehen! (1888-1891).

The 1884 romance also returned in the most famous funeral march of the first symphony (1888-1894), in a mix of quotes that alludes to the author's autobiographical experience. The fundamental quote is a gloomy parody of the Fra Martino canon, a childish song to which Mahler has always attributed a sense of tragedy, which obsesses him all the time just as he is looking for an incipit and which, finally accepted into the symphony, sustains a sarcastic and sinister atmosphere.

Both the funeral march of the first symphony and that of the fifth are inspired by Mendelssohn 's model. The first finds its precedent in the parodic funeral march of A Midsummer Night's Dream (1843), a short-lived piece which in turn hints at Fra Martino 's theme and furthermore retains the typical trait of dotted rhythm. The second openly quotes the incipit of the Romanza senza parole op. 62 n. 3 (1842-1844).

==== The revival of Lenten funeral marches ====
From the military and royal funeral marches, the religious funeral marches developed since the 17th century. It evolved as a more specific genre in the 19th century with this repertoire being formed over the course of several decades. In the archives of the Hermandad de la Amargura (Brotherhood of Bitterness) of Seville, there is evidence of the Lenten funeral marches with the formation of the musical band known as the Banda del Asilo de San Fernando and today as the Municipal Symphonic Band of Seville through the artistic activity of Andrés Palatín Palma, who provided musical services for Holy Week since April 14, 1838.

In Italy, the earliest record of a special repertoire for those bands dates from 1857, the year in which Vincenzo Valente (1830-1908) composed U Conzasiegge, the oldest Molfetta Funeral March known today. It was another man with links to the Puglia, Vincenzo Alemanno, active as an organist in the 19th century in the main churches of Gallipoli who canonized the genre. A composition taken from his Requiem Mass and composed for the Solemn Funeral of Pope Pius IX, celebrated in the Cathedral Church of Sant'Agata, Saturday 16 March 1878 when Alemanno was organist at the same time at the Cathedral of Sant'Agata, the Chiesa del Carmine and the Chiesa delle Anime.

The genre crossed into Latin America, and became particular in many countries. They often followed a similar trajectory, from military to religious, to classical marches. The oldest Latin American funeral march known is the Marcha Morán, a Peruvian funeral march that tradition claims was composed in Arequipa in homage to General Trinidad Morán, shot in 1854. Since the 1870s, this melody has accompanied the journey of the Virgin of Sorrows, one of the most revered Catholic images of Arequipa, whose procession takes place every Good Friday of Holy Week, from the church of Santo Domingo. In Guatemala Lenten funeral marches have become a national treasure. La Fosa, by Santiago Coronado, is one of the first documented guatemaltec funeral marches, dating from 1888. Among the pioneers of the genre are also Salvador Iriarte, author of Jesús de la Merced, and Marcial Prem, creator of Funeral March n.3.

=== 20th century ===
After a golden age of funeral marches in the nineteenth century, the musical genre also thrived in the twentieth century: examples can be found among others in Britten, Kodály or Sibelius. There are various rearrangements of older masterpieces and especially of Chopin's funeral march. Saint-Saëns drew from it, for example, an arrangement for two pianos (1907), while Satie in his Embryons desséchés (1913) joked about it with a series of trivializing melodic and harmonic devices.

==== Shostakovich and the Russian funeral march ====
In particular, the funeral marches stand out in the production of Shostakovich, whose entire work is permeated by death, of which he is a constant witness in the collective tragedies of Russian history of the 20th century. The composer made his debut in the genre at the age of eleven with a piano piece dedicated to the fallen of the October Revolution (1917), transcribed a work by Schubert (1920) and then left numerous other examples, including the adagio In memoriam of the Symphony no. 15 (1957).

The obsessive theme of death deepens and is placed in special relief in his late production. Heartbreaking given the circumstances of his composition is the funeral march included in String Quartet No. 15 (1974), completed in hospital and entirely permeated by the idea of death, in «a disconsolate and tragic farewell to life» of the author now at the end of his existence.

==== Epic Lenten marches ====
In many places until the 20th century, the processions of Holy Week did not tolerate bands as instruments were banned from liturgy during Lent, there these processions were made in silence as it is still the case in many places, such as in the Procession of Silence in San Luis Potosi. However, with the continuous attraction of crowds, bands have been helpful to cover the noise and keep a pious atmosphere around the solemn moments. Thus, during Holy Week in Leon in 1959, a great novelty occurs: for the first time, a band of bugles and drums belonging entirely to a brotherhood and parades in a tunic accompanying the images of the Passion, Death and Resurrection of Our Lord.

The composition of the funeral march La Madrugá on Holy Tuesday 1987, April 14, marks a before and after processional music for the specific genre of Lenten funeral marches. It has since been performed in all the concert programs of Holy Week in Seville. Likewise, the Music Bands incorporate it into their processional routes, spreading it throughout Andalusia. With Abel Moreno moved to Madrid, its nationwide dissemination became unstoppable, becoming a reference not only for Spanish Holy Week, but for the entire world. The mutual enrichment and recognition between classical and popular "band" funeral marches was reached with this composition which go "in crescendo" until the explosion of the final tutti, allowing it to share programs with the "Passion" Symphony by J. Haydn and the Requiem by W. A. Mozart.

In Guatemala, it was not until 1988 that the procession known as the “Penitential Procession of the First Thursday of Lent” in Guatemala, has incorporated the presence of a musical band with the authorization of archbishop Monsignor Barrios Sánchez. The official marches that are performed are “Ramito de Olivo”, “King of the Universe” and “Jesús de San José”.

== Analysis ==
=== Form ===
The original structure of the funeral march repeats that of the Lullian military march in two repetitions of eight measures each. Subsequently, the genre evolved towards the form of the march with a ternary structure. The modern military march provides a ternary structure: the march itself is followed by a trio at the end of which the march starts again from the beginning. This pattern or a variant of it is usually used in the funeral march.

However, while other types of marches do not differ essentially from the ordinary model, the funeral march has characteristics that instantly distinguish it from other compositions. Mendelssohn, who for the fifth volume of hisSongs without Words composed a piece which overall did not correspond to the form of the funeral march, had his publishers title it Trauermarsch simply because of the characteristics of the first bars. The Lied was then instrumented by Moscheles and performed at Mendelssohn's funeral (7 November 1847).

=== Tempo and meter ===
Funeral marches are typically solemn marches, very slow in tempo (lento and adagio and similar tempos), in binary or quaternary measures of sad and regular progress. The time signature can be generic or specified by the composer via a metronome signature. In all cases there are several possible interpretations of the funeral march time. In fact, if the metronome is indicated, the speed of execution can vary from 44-48 bpm for Liszt's funeral marches to 92 of that contained in Symphony no. 1 of Ries. Beethoven himself indicates a tempo of 80 bpm to the quaver for the Eroica funeral march, although it is normally played slower. It is possible that the influences of national military traditions weighed on the choice of composers: the Austrian one, for example, prescribed the more pressing pace typical of the marches of the grenadiers and riflemen.

The military manuals of the eighteenth and nineteenth centuries do not expressly set the funeral march tempo, but suggest that it is at most that of the ordinary pace, and if possible slower. This is provided in particular by the regulations of the New York State Militia (1858), which allowed the ordinary step only when the distance to the place of burial was considerable (article 319). The modern military standard tends to halve the common march time and perform the funeral march at 60 bpm. However, the funeral pace is the slowest of the marching steps and is therefore located at the extreme limit opposite to the quickstep time.

=== Rhythm ===
The typical rhythm of the funeral march is dotted. The note following that episode normally lasts a quarter of the movement to which it belongs, but in some compositions it is reduced to an eighth (as in the second movement of the Eroica and in Grieg's Funeral March in memory of Rikard Nordraak (1866), where short notes are dusk notes). Czerny codified the rhythm of solemn, parade and funeral marches in the following two ways:

https://upload.wikimedia.org/score/e/y/ey2k22xfz1i0wa9kojxoilisr0cjp56/ey2k22xf.png

=== Mode ===
The funeral marches are mostly written in the minor mode, but the rule suffers from illustrious exceptions: for example, Handel's funeral marches are in the major mode. The melodic line is short and dark, and often resorts to the repetition of notes. An ascending minor third interval can characterize the main theme.

In the form established in the 19th century, the piece includes a trio in a major mode, often written in the parallel key, in the relative key, or in that of the subdominant of the latter. This section can represent a pitiful episode, or a consolatory one, or a heroic one, or at times (as in the specific case of Chopin's masterpiece) of complex interpretation, or it may want to sublimate death into a positive mystery.

=== Instruments ===
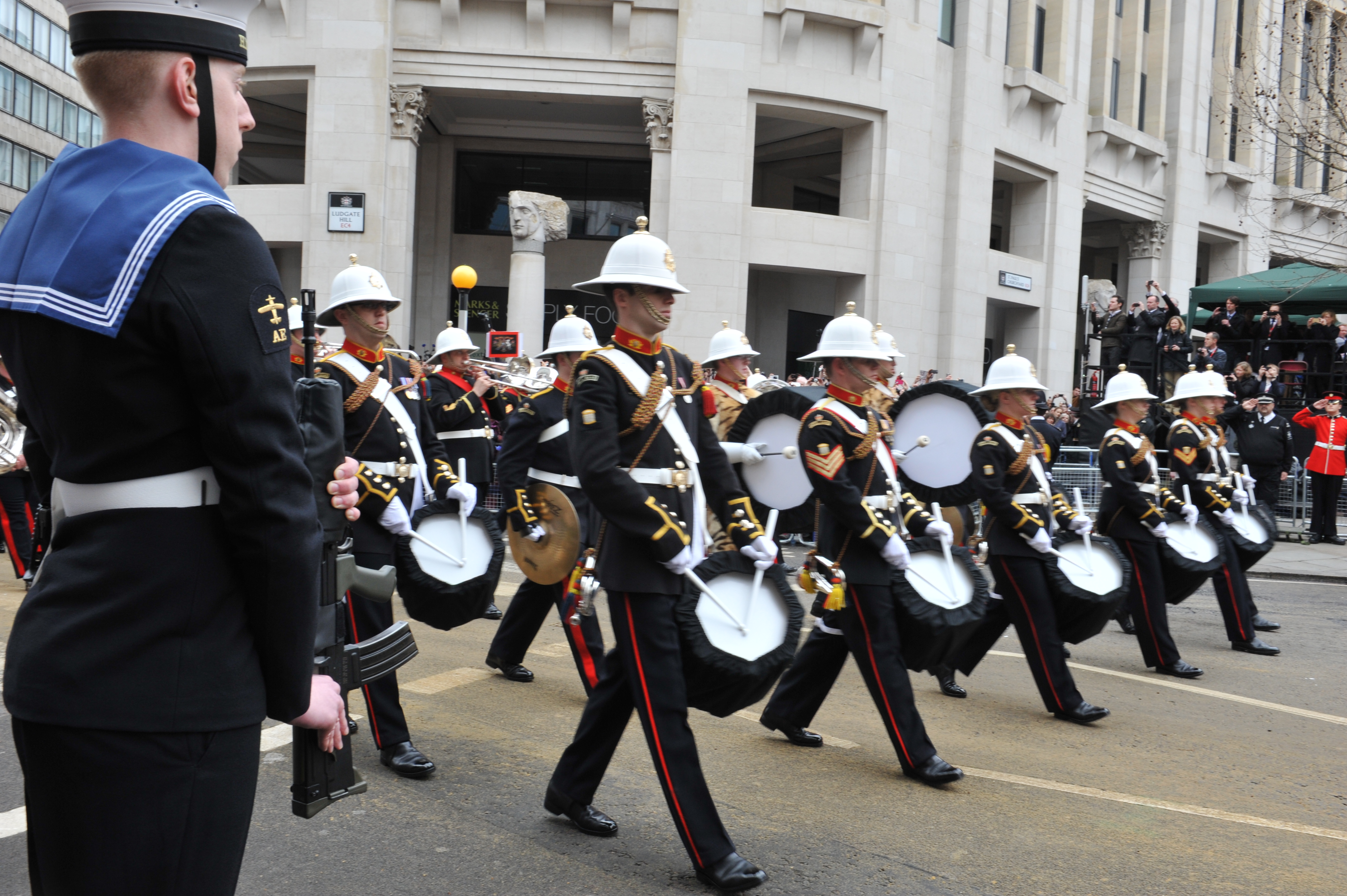
During the state funeral of Margaret Thatcher, the muffled drums playing the funeral march are covered in black cloth which symbolizes mourning and muffles the sound.

Funeral marches are usually performed by wind ensembles, which allow greater sound power in open spaces, as required by funeral ceremonies and processions. The reasons for the predilection for aerophones, however, are not merely practical, but also symbolic: in this sense, they derive from the biblical association between death and wind instruments such as the flute and the trumpet.

The use of drums (possibly muted), of military origin, is also normal. When, at the beginning of the 19th century, the use of these instruments in the orchestra was not common, the composer made up for it with strings in the low registers: they simulate percussion by exploiting the ear's difficulty in recognizing the pitch of low sounds, which seem almost indeterminate. Even the piano, as a struck string instrument, can easily imitate the drum.

Idiophones are prized for their ability to reproduce the sound of death knells.

== Genres ==
=== Funeral music ===
In terms of content, the funeral march belongs to the more generic funeral music, which includes expressive forms other than the march, some of which are entrusted to singing. Another of these forms is the requiem, which falls within the context of liturgical music.[64] In the United States, the contamination of the European and African traditions of the military band and the spiritual has given rise to the tradition of the jazz funeral, typical of New Orleans, in which a brass band accompanies the funeral with hymns and funeral songs in marching time.

=== Lenten and Holy Week processions ===
Funeral march of Francesco Porto used during Holy Week in Ruvo di Puglia

Funeral marches found their most common and regular expression in the Passiontide processions of the Spanish and Italian religious tradition which were propagated to Latin America especially Peru and Guatemala and all of Christianity. In southern Italy, popular funeral marches are still enormous successful, and musical bands perform entire repertoires of them in the long demonstrations of Holy Week.

=== Parody ===
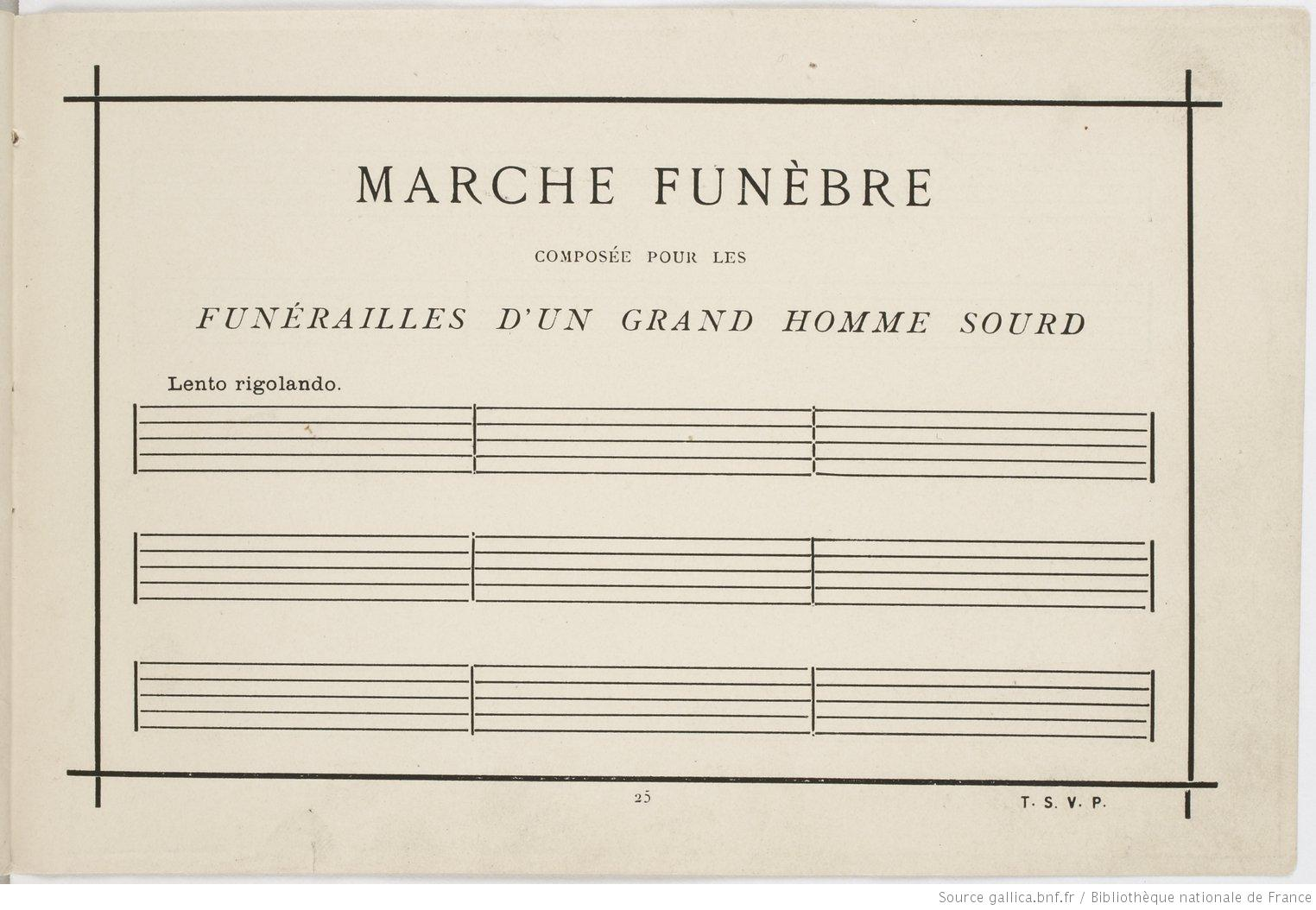
The empty score of the Funeral March for a Great Deaf Man by Allais.

The unmistakability of its characteristics and the possibility of exploiting its stereotypes makes the funeral march a genre that lends itself well to parodic and joking use, to the point of the grotesque.

In addition to Mahler's first symphony, where the parody takes on a ghostly tone, we find a famous example in Gounod's Funeral March for a Marionette (1872), which became famous in the 1950s and 1960s as the theme song for Alfred Hitchcock's television series. Charles-Valentin Alkan's Funeral March on the Death of a Parrot (1858), a surreal composition for wind instruments and choir is another classic of the genre: it mocks the funeral marches of Rossini, Gossec and Beethoven.The joking Italian title of Mozart's Kleiner Trauermarsch has led to suspicions of a self-parody of his Concerto for Piano and Orchestra No. 16, but the opinion is not sufficiently shared.

The French humorist Alphonse Allais "wrote" a Marche funèbre composée pour les funérailles d'un grand homme sourd (Funeral March for a Great Deaf Man), a completely blank score bearing the tempo Lento rigolando (inspired by the colloquial verb rigoler, "to joke").

== Répertoire ==
=== Classical funeral marches ===
- The Marche funèbre second movement of Charles-Valentin Alkan's Symphony for Solo Piano, Op. 39, No. 5.
- Alkan's "Funeral March on the Death of a Parrot" for four-part chorus, three oboes and bassoon.
- The second movement of Ludwig van Beethoven's Symphony No. 3 (Eroica): Marcia funebre: Adagio assai.
- The third movement of Beethoven's Piano Sonata No. 12: Maestoso andante, marcia funebre sulla morte d'un eroe
- Funeral March No.1, formerly attributed to Beethoven (WoO Anhang 13), believed to be by Johann Heinrich Walch, played annually at the National Service of Remembrance at The Cenotaph in London, and played during procession in British state funerals.
- The Funeral March for the Final Scene of Hamlet by Hector Berlioz.
- Grande symphonie funèbre et triomphale by Hector Berlioz (Op. 15, 1840), a symphony for military band in three movements.
- The eighth variation from Benjamin Britten's Variations on a Theme of Frank Bridge, Op. 10: Variation 8: Funeral March.
- Marche funèbre for piano written by Frédéric Chopin in 1837, which became the 3rd movement of his Piano Sonata No. 2 in B-flat minor, Op. 35.
- Chopin's Marche funèbre for piano in C minor, Op. posth. 72, No. 2.
- The second movement of Robert Schumann's Piano Quintet, Op. 44
- The second movement of Ferdinand David's Concertino for Trombone and Orchestra: Marcia funebre (Andante).
- The Trauermarsch written by Anton Diabelli in memory of Michael Haydn for solo guitar.
- Introduction and Funeral March in Edward Elgar's Grania and Diarmid, Op. 42, the score for the play Diarmuid and Grania.
- The "Funeral Music" for Akhnaten's father in Act I of the opera Akhnaten, by Philip Glass.
- The Funeral March of a Marionette by Charles Gounod (1872); this later became known to contemporary audiences as the theme music used for the Alfred Hitchcock Presents television series (1955–65)
- The Funeral March in Memory of Rikard Nordraak by Edvard Grieg.
- The Marche funèbre et chant séraphique (Funeral March and Seraphic Song), for organ, Op.17, No.3, by Alexandre Guilmant.
- The Dead March from Saul by George Frideric Handel.
- Franz Liszt's Marche funèbre, En mémoire de Maximilian I, Empereur du Mexique ("Funeral march, In memory of Maximilian I, Emperor of Mexico") from Années de pèlerinage, Book 3.
- Liszt's Trauervorspiel und Trauermarsch, S.206 (written in 1885 (the year before he died), and published three years later in 1888)
- The third movement of Gustav Mahler's first symphony, "Funeral March in the Manner of Callot" based on "Bruder Martin", the German minor-key variant of the children's song "Frère Jacques.", and the Trauermarsch opening movement of his Symphony No. 5.
- Song Without Words, Op. 62, No. 3, by Felix Mendelssohn: Andante maestoso: Trauermarsch
- The march from Funeral Sentences and Music for the Funeral of Queen Mary, by Henry Purcell.
- The funeral march for Lìu in the opera Turandot, by Giacomo Puccini.
- The second movement of Ferdinand Ries's Symphony No. 1: Marche funebre.
- The fifth movement of Dmitri Shostakovich's String Quartet No. 15: Funeral march: Adagio molto.
- The funeral march In memoriam by Jean Sibelius (Op. 59, 1909, revised 1910).
- "Siegfried's Funeral March" from Götterdämmerung by Richard Wagner.
- The fourth piece from Anton Webern's 6 Pieces for Orchestra, Op. 6: Langsam, marcia funebre.

=== Funeral marches for bands ===
An exhaustive list of the countless band funeral marches composed between the 19th and 20th centuries is practically impossible. Only the most famous can be mentioned.

- Ah! Sì, versate lacrime (anonimo)
- A Desirè (A.La Vela)
- Mater dolorosa (Mariano Bartolucci)
- Eterno pianto (Ernesto Becucci)
- Cristo alla colonna (Giuseppe Bellisario)
- Marcia funebre (Meindart Boekel)
- Grido di dolore (Amleto Cardone)
- Dolore senza lacrime (Cimaglia)
- Mesti rintocchi (Cimaglia)
- Pax (Luigi Cirenei)
- Sconforto (Curri)
- Ultimo saluto (De Cintio)
- Alla memoria del gran re (Fabiani)
- Rimembranze (Garofalo)
- Lacrime (Giammarinaro)
- A catanisa (Giappesi)
- Addio per sempre (Giappesi)
- Pace eterna (Ippolito)
- Nenia funebre (Lombardo)
- In memoria di Giacomo Puccini (Manente)
- Afflitta (Orsomando)
- Dolores (Orsomando)
- Strazio, lacrime e pietà (Perrini)
- Pianto eterno (Quatrano)
- Povero re (Rossaro)
- In memoriam (Sousa)
- Una lagrima sulla tomba di mia madre (Vella)
- Piccolo fiore (Vitale)
- Un dernier hommage (Ernest Marie)
- Le Champs du Repos (Michel Bléger)
- Calde Lacrime (Cesare de Michelis)

=== Funeral marches in films ===
- "Cortege funèbre" by Darius Milhaud in Espoir (1945)
- "Marcia funebre" by Carlo Rustichelli in Divorzio all'italiana (1961)
- "Funeral Music" by Zbigniew Preisner in Three Colours: Blue (1993)
- "Prima e dopo" by Ennio Morricone in Baarìa (2009)

== Bibliography ==
- Burke, Richard N. (1991). The Marche Funèbre from Beethoven to Mahler. City University of New York.
- Kim, Jung Hyun (2021). The Expressive Meaning of Funeral Marches in Early 19th Century Chamber Music. Manhattan School of Music.

== See also ==
- Dirge
