= Piano Sonata No. 12 (Beethoven) =

Piano sonata by Beethoven, composed 1800-01

Piano Sonata No.12
- by Ludwig van Beethoven
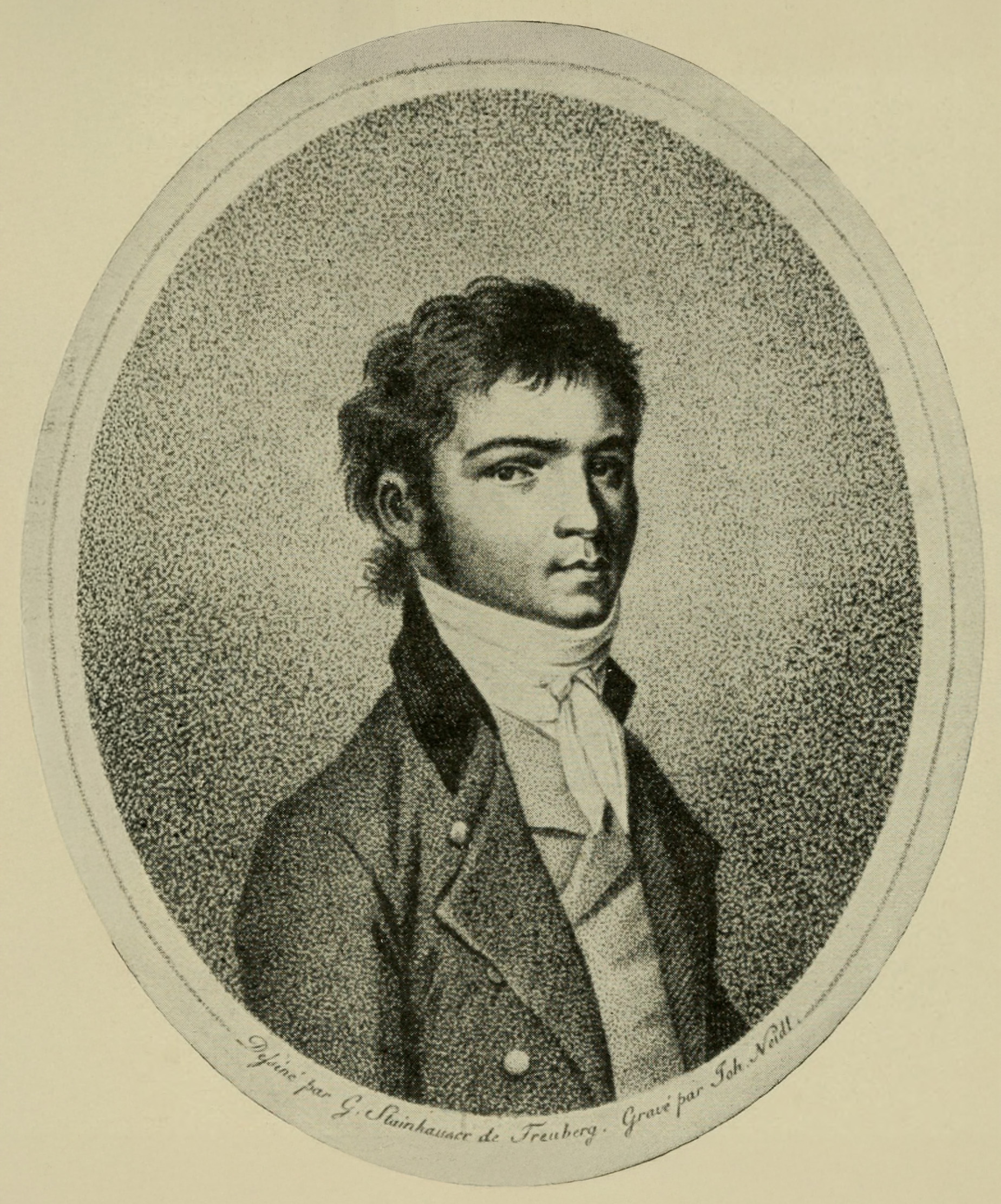
- 1801 engraving by Johann Joseph Neidl, after a now-lost portrait of Beethoven by Gandolph Ernst Stainhauser von Treuberg, ca. 1800
- Key: A♭ major
- Opus: 26
- Composed: 1800-01
- Duration: 20-22 minutes
- Movements: 4

I. Andante con variazioni

II. Scherzo, allegro molto

III. Maestoso andante, marcia funebre sulla morte d'un eroe

IV. Allegro
Played by Artur Schnabel in 1932

Ludwig van Beethoven composed his Piano Sonata No. 12 in A♭ major, Op. 26, in 1800–01, around the same time as he completed his First Symphony. He dedicated the sonata to Prince Karl von Lichnowsky, who had been his patron since 1792.

Consisting of four movements, the sonata takes around 20–22 minutes to perform.

The autograph manuscript of the sonata is preserved in the Jagiellonian Library.

== Structure ==
1. Andante con variazioni 3/8 A♭ major
2. Scherzo, allegro molto 3/4 A♭ major, D♭ major, A♭ major
3. Maestoso andante, marcia funebre sulla morte d'un eroe 4/4 A♭ minor, A♭ major
4. Allegro, Rondo form 2/4 A♭ major

The structure of the sonata is unconventional in that the piece opens with a relatively slow movement in the format of theme and variations (Mozart did the same in his Piano Sonata No. 11). The third movement incorporates a funeral march, clearly anticipating the watershed of the Eroica Symphony that Beethoven wrote in 1803–1804. This is the only movement from his sonatas that Beethoven arranged for orchestra, and was played during Beethoven's own funeral procession in 1827.

This sonata is also unusual in that none of its four movements is in sonata-allegro form.

In most of Beethoven's four-movement sonatas, the third movement is in 3/4 and in ternary form, while the second movement is slow and in a different key from the other movements. In this sonata, the second and third movements have switched roles, where the second movement is the ternary scherzo and trio, while the third movement is the slow movement in the tonic minor.

=== I. Andante con variazioni ===

Donald Francis Tovey described this movement as "intensely aristocratic".

The movement consists of a theme by Beethoven and five variations. The third variation has been called a "pre-echo" of the funeral march movement by Andras Schiff during his lecture on the sonata. This movement is also unusual in the sense that it is not in sonata form but rather a set of variations on a theme.

=== II. Scherzo, allegro molto ===

Tovey described this movement as "witty and far from easy".

=== III. Maestoso andante, marcia funebre sulla morte d'un eroe ===

In some editions there are no tempo markings, just "Marcia Funebre, sulla morte d'un Eroe" ("Funeral March, relating to the death of a hero").

14 years after finishing Op. 26, in 1815, Beethoven transcribed this movement for orchestra as part of a suite of incidental music to Johann Duncker's play Leonore Prohaska, bearing the catalogue number WoO 96.

=== IV. Allegro ===

The final rondo is rather short – a performance typically takes around 3 minutes. The rondo returns to the A♭ major of the first two movements, and like them is full of innovative rhythms. This brief rondo has three short episodes, the second in C minor, and in a usual move, the third episode reprises the first: whereas the first episode was in the dominant (E♭), the third presents the same material in the tonic.

== Influence ==
The main theme of Schubert's Impromptu in A♭ major, Op. 142 No. 2 is strikingly similar to the theme in the first movement of Beethoven's sonata. The four-bar phrases that open these pieces are almost identical in most musical aspects: key, harmony, voicing, register, and basic as well as harmonic rhythm. Another less immediate connection exists with the main theme, also in A♭ major, of the Adagio movement in Schubert's piano sonata in C minor, D. 958. Indeed, Schubert may have borrowed these themes from Beethoven, as he often did in his compositions.

This sonata was greatly admired by Chopin, who repeated its basic sequence of scherzo, funeral march with trio, and perpetuum mobile finale in his own Piano Sonata in B♭ minor. His first movement, however, is also animated and in sonata form, unlike Beethoven's Andante con variazioni. This is the only Beethoven sonata that Chopin performed regularly.
