= Edriophthalma =

Class of crustaceans

Edriophthalma is a disused peracarid (Malacostraca) classification comprising Isopoda and Amphipoda, first proposed by William Elford Leach in 1815. They have several common features, such as the fact that they both lack a carapace, possess sessile compound eyes, and thoracic coxae fused to their pleurites. Some molecular studies have shown that these are not related. The group has also been known as Acaridea and Arthrostraca.
