= Piano Sonata No. 2 (Chopin) =

1839 sonata by Chopin

- by Frédéric Chopin
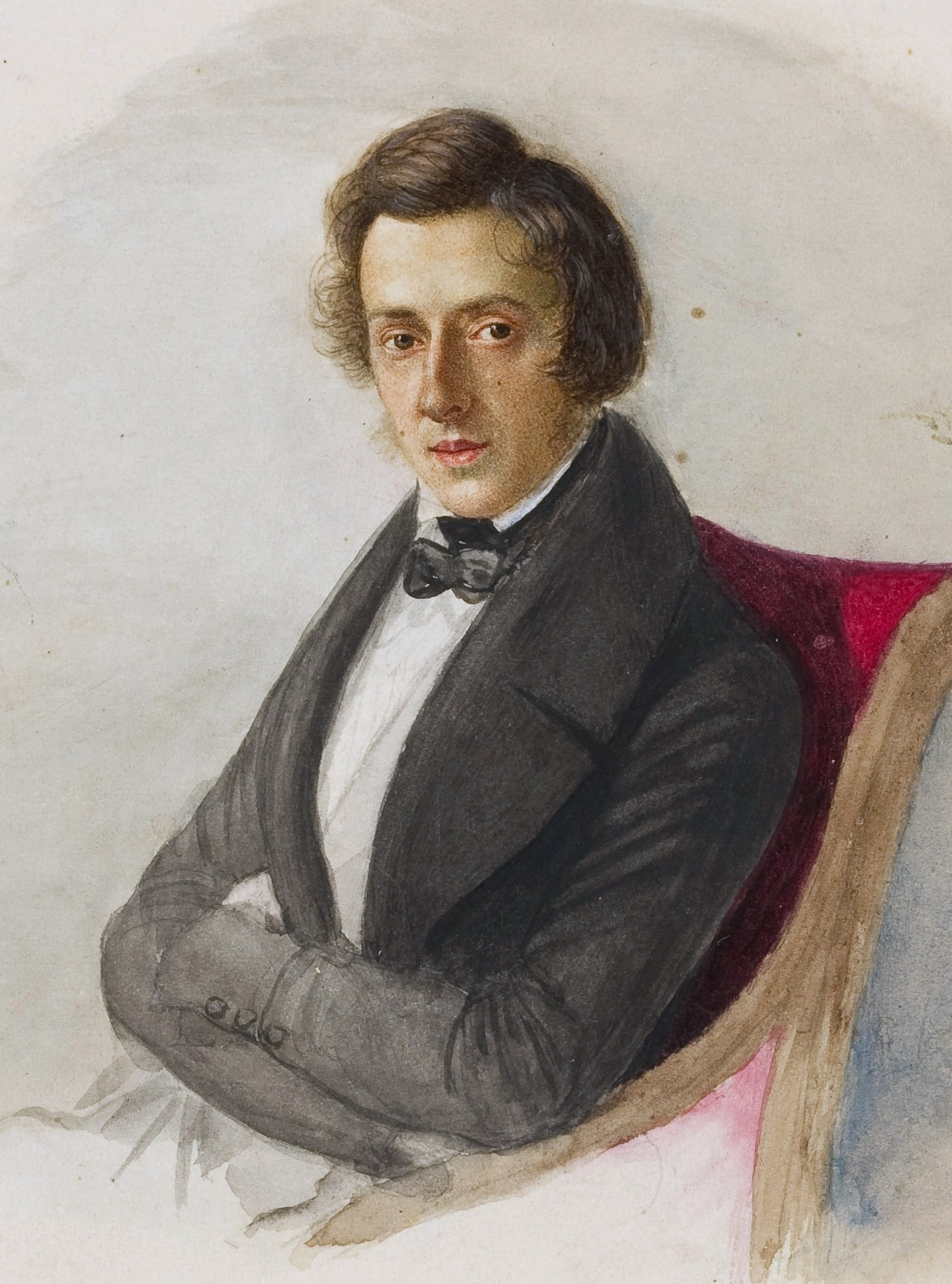
- Watercolour of Chopin by Maria Wodzińska, 1836
- Other name: Funeral March
- Key: B♭ minor
- Opus: 35
- Form: Piano sonata
- Composed: 1837–1839
- Published: 1840
- Duration: About 21–25 minutes
- Movements: Four

The Piano Sonata No. 2 in B♭ minor, Op. 35, is a piano sonata in four movements by Polish composer Frédéric Chopin. Chopin completed the work while living in George Sand's manor in Nohant, some 250 km (160 mi) south of Paris, a year before it was published in 1840. The first of the composer's three mature sonatas (the others being the Piano Sonata No. 3 in B minor, Op. 58 and the Sonata for Piano and Cello in G minor, Op. 65), the work is considered to be one of the greatest piano sonatas of the literature.

The third movement of the Piano Sonata No. 2 is Chopin's famous funeral march (French: Marche funèbre; Polish: Marsz żałobny) which was composed at least two years before the remainder of the work and has remained, by itself, one of Chopin's most popular compositions. The Piano Sonata No. 2 carries allusions and reminiscences of music by J. S. Bach and by Ludwig van Beethoven; Beethoven's Piano Sonata No. 12 also has a funeral march as its third movement. A typical performance of Chopin's second sonata lasts between 21 and 25 minutes, depending on whether the repetition of the first movement's exposition is observed.

While the Piano Sonata No. 2 gained instant popularity with the public, critical reception was initially more doubtful. Robert Schumann, among other critics, argued that the work was structurally inferior and that Chopin "could not quite handle sonata form", a criticism that did not withstand time. The work has been recorded by numerous pianists and is regularly programmed in concerts and piano competitions. The Marche funèbre exists in countless arrangements and has been performed at funerals all over the world (including Chopin's own), having become an archetypal evocation of death.

== Historical background ==
The Piano Sonata No. 2 was written during a time where the sonata lost its overpowering dominance. While the sonatas of Beethoven and Mozart comprised a considerable portion of their compositional output, this is not true of the next generation of composers: Franz Liszt only wrote two sonatas among his dozens of instrumental compositions, Robert Schumann seven (eight if including the Fantasie in C, Op. 17), and Felix Mendelssohn thirteen. Besides the Piano Sonata No. 2, Chopin wrote only three other sonatas: the Piano Sonata in C minor (Op. posth. 4), written at the age of eighteen; the Piano Sonata No. 3 in B minor (Op. 58); and the Sonata for Piano and Cello in G minor (Op. 65).

The compositional origins of the Piano Sonata No. 2, the first mature piano sonata Chopin wrote, are centred on its third movement (Marche funèbre), a funeral march which many scholars indicate was written in 1837. However, Jeffrey Kallberg believes that such indications are because of an autograph manuscript of eight bars of music in D♭ major marked Lento cantabile, apparently written as a gift to an unnamed recipient. The manuscript, which is dated 28 November 1837, would later become part of the trio of the Marche funèbre. However, Kallberg suggests this manuscript may have been intended as the beginning of an earlier attempt of a different slow movement instead of being part of the Marche funèbre, writing that "it would have been unusual for Chopin to make a gift of a manuscript that, if it did not contain an entire piece, did not at least quote the beginning of it", as almost all of his other presentation manuscripts did. He also suggests that a four-hand arrangement by Julian Fontana of the Marche funèbre may be connected with an abandoned piano sonata for four hands that Chopin wrote in 1835, originally to be published as his Op. 28 (which was instead appropriated to the 24 Preludes, Op. 28), therefore raising the possibility that the movement may actually date from 1835 instead of the generally accepted 1837.

Some time after writing the Marche funèbre, Chopin composed the other movements, completing the entire sonata by 1839. In a letter on 8 August 1839, addressed to Fontana, Chopin wrote:

I am writing here a Sonata in B-flat minor which will contain my March which you already know. There is an Allegro, then a Scherzo in E-flat minor, the March and a short Finale about three pages of my manuscript-paper. The left hand and the right hand gossip in unison after the March. ... My father has written to say that my old sonata [in C minor, Op. 4] has been published (Note: Op. 4 was not actually published until after Chopin's death, but the work had already been engraved and begun to circulate.) by [Tobias Haslinger] and that the German critics praise it. Including the ones in your hands I now have six manuscripts. I'll see the publishers damned before they get them for nothing.

Haslinger's unauthorised dissemination of Chopin's early C minor sonata (he had gone as far as engraving the work and allowing it to circulate, against the composer's wishes) may have increased the pressure Chopin had to publish a piano sonata, which may explain why Chopin added the other movements to the Marche funèbre to produce a sonata. The work was finished in the summer of 1839 in Nohant (near Châteauroux), in France, and published in May 1840 in London, Leipzig, and Paris. The work was not furnished with a dedication.

== Analysis ==
I. Grave, Doppio movimento
Andreas Xenopoulos, piano

II. Scherzo
Paul Pitman, piano

III. Marche funèbre, Lento
Andreas Xenopoulos, piano

IV. Finale, Presto
Paul Pitman, piano

The sonata comprises four movements:

1. Grave – Doppio movimento (B♭ minor – B♭ major)
2. Scherzo (E♭ minor with a trio and ending both in G♭ major)
3. Marche funèbre: Lento (B♭ minor with a trio in D♭ major)
4. Finale: Presto (B♭ minor)

=== I. Grave – Doppio movimento ===
5–7 minutes (Note: 5 minutes if the repetition of the exposition is left out altogether; 7 minutes if the repeat is observed)

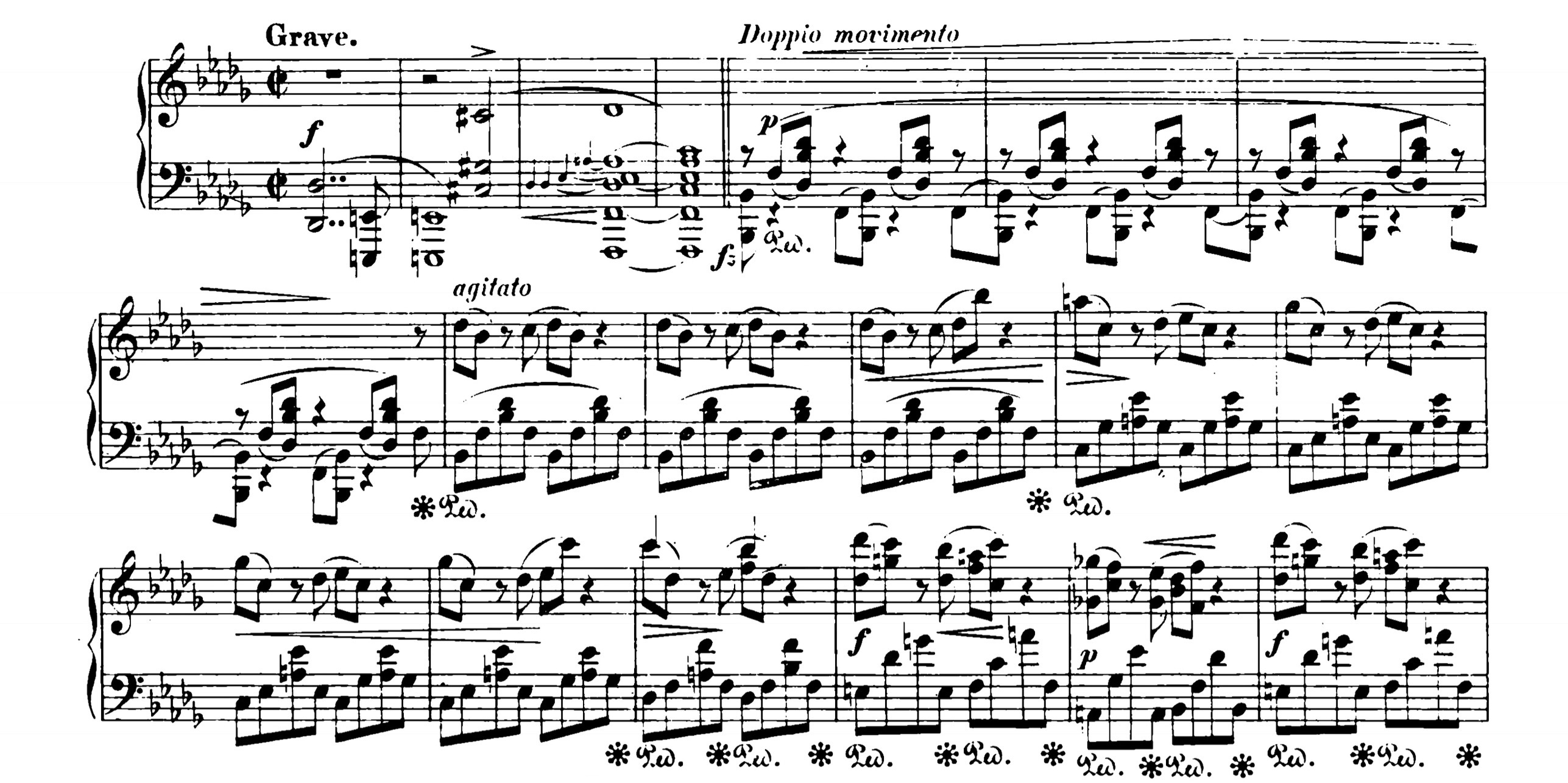
Breitkopf & Härtel edition edited by Johannes Brahms (1878). This edition lacks a backwards repeat sign at the Doppio movimento and therefore indicates that the repetition of the exposition should start at the Grave.

The first movement is in a modified sonata form (Note: "Modified" in that the principal section containing the main theme does not return in the recapitulation.) in B♭ minor and 2/2 time. It opens with a four-bar introduction in the relative major, D♭ major marked Grave, followed by a tempo change to Doppio movimento, (Note: From Merriam-Webster Online: Doppio movimento – "twice as fast as the preceding — used as a direction in music") a key change to the tonic key, and the introduction of an agitated bass accompanimental figure; four bars later, the main theme enters. The main theme, marked agitato, is followed by a second theme, in D♭ major, which is marked piano and sostenuto. In the beginning of the development, all of the themes introduced in the exposition appear. (Note: The first three bars (106–108) come from the main theme; the next bar (109) from the secondary theme; the following bar from the Grave introduction, and so on.) Later in the development, a seemingly new tune, which is actually an inversion of part of the second theme, is introduced. In the climax of the development, Chopin combines three elements at once: the motifs from the Grave introduction and the main theme in the bass and treble respectively, with crotchet triplets in the middle. In the recapitulation, the principal section containing the main theme does not return, possibly inspired by the older binary sonata form typical of Domenico Scarlatti's keyboard sonatas; instead, only the lyrical second theme returns in the tonic's parallel major of B♭. The movement is closed with a brilliant 12-bar stretto which forms a coda of 12 bars, ending in three B♭ major chords marked fff (fortississimo).

==== Repeat of the exposition ====
When the sonata was published in 1840 in the usual three cities of Paris, Leipzig, and London, the London and Paris editions indicated the repeat of the exposition as starting at the very beginning of the movement (at the Grave section). However, the Leipzig edition designed the repeat as beginning at the Doppio movimento section. Although the critical edition published by Breitkopf & Härtel (that was edited, among others, by Franz Liszt, Carl Reinecke, and Johannes Brahms) indicate the repeat similarly to the London and Paris first editions, almost all 20th-century editions are similar to the Leipzig edition in this regard. Charles Rosen argues that the repeat of the exposition in the manner perpetrated by the Leipzig edition is a serious error, saying it is "musically impossible" as it interrupts the D♭ major cadence (which ends the exposition) with the B♭ minor accompanimental figure. Edward T. Cone agrees, calling the repeat to the Doppio movimento "nonsense". However, Leikin advocates for excluding the Grave from the repeat of the exposition, citing in part that Karol Mikuli's 1880 complete edition of Chopin contained a repeat sign after the Grave in the first movement of the Piano Sonata No. 2. Mikuli was a student of Chopin from 1844 to 1848 and also observed lessons Chopin gave to other students – including those where this sonata was taught – and took extensive notes.

Most commercial recordings exclude the Grave from the repetition of the exposition, including those of Martha Argerich, Vladimir Ashkenazy, Stefan Askenase, Arturo Benedetti Michelangeli, Vlado Perlemuter, Rafał Blechacz, Nelson Freire, Cécile Ousset, Andrei Gavrilov, Hélène Grimaud, Peter Jablonski, Wilhelm Kempff, Nikita Magaloff, Krystian Zimerman, Murray Perahia, Maurizio Pollini (in his 1985 recording), and Yuja Wang. However, Pollini's 2008 recording, Louis Lortie's, and Mitsuko Uchida's recordings, among others, begin the repetition from the Grave. Other recordings, including those of Alfred Cortot, Robert Casadesus, Guiomar Novaes, Daniel Barenboim, Seong-Jin Cho, Vladimir Horowitz, Julius Katchen, Evgeny Kissin, İdil Biret, Garrick Ohlsson, Ivo Pogorelić, Sergei Rachmaninoff, Arthur Rubinstein, and Khatia Buniatishvili, exclude the repetition altogether.

=== II. Scherzo ===
6–7 minutes

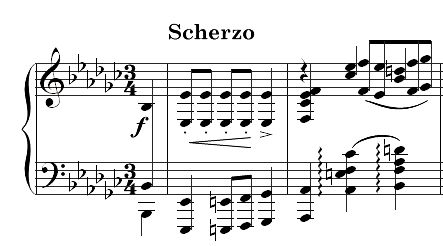
Opening of the Scherzo

The second movement is a scherzo in E♭ minor and 3/4 time with no tempo indication. Anatole Leikin suggests that the absence of the tempo indication can be explained by the close similarities of this movement and the closing section of the first movement, including the prevalence of repeated octaves and chords in both movements, and the identical cadential phrases. Therefore, the absence of a tempo indication may suggest that there is no new tempo, but instead a mere change of notation (from triplets to triple metre).

The movement is in the conventional scherzo-trio-scherzo form with the trio in G♭ major. The scherzo's explosive rhythmic and dynamic power, as well as its furious insistence on repeated chords and octaves, places it in the tradition of the scherzo movements of Beethoven. However, unlike Beethoven, whose scherzos are transformed minuets, this scherzo has many defining rhythmic characteristics that make it a transformed mazurka instead. The trio, marked Più lento, has a songlike quality to it with its simple, sensuous melody. Following the return of the scherzo is a coda that is a condensed reprise of the trio and therefore ends the work in the relative major; other works of Chopin that also end in the relative major include the Scherzo No. 2 in B♭ minor (Op. 31) and the Fantaisie in F minor (Op. 49).

=== III. Marche funèbre: Lento ===
8–9 minutes

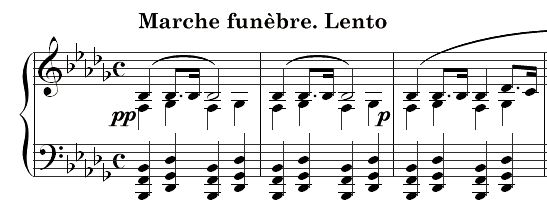
Opening of the Marche funèbre

The third movement, titled Marche funèbre, is a "stark juxtaposition of funeral march and pastoral trio". The movement is in B♭ minor and 4/4 time with the trio in the relative major of D♭. The tempo designation, Lento, was not added until after the sonata's publication in 1840. The movement opens with a melody consisting of just a repeated B♭ for almost three measures accompanied by alternating B♭ (without the third) and G♭ major chords that ring like a funeral bell. This melodic device was also used as the backbone for the main theme of the preceding Scherzo movement and part of the coda of the opening movement. The melody following the repeated B♭, is, as Alan Walker notes, "a strict retrograde" of the first movement's main theme. The trio of the movement, which is in the tonic's relative major, consists of a serene nocturne-like melody accompanied by quavers in the left hand.

The Marche funèbre alone has remained one of Chopin's most popular compositions and has become an archetypal evocation of death. It has been widely arranged for other instrumentations, most notably for orchestra. The first known orchestral arrangement of the movement was made by Napoléon Henri Reber and was played at the graveside during Chopin's own burial on 30 October 1849 at Père Lachaise Cemetery in Paris. The English conductor Henry Wood made two orchestrations of the Marche funèbre, the first of which was played at The Proms on four occasions between 1895 and 1904. For the First Night of the 1907 Proms on 17 August 1907, Wood conducted a new version he had written on learning of the death two days earlier of the renowned violinist Joseph Joachim. In March, 1932, Sir Edward Elgar transcribed the Marche funèbre for full orchestra on a commission from The Gramophone Co. Ltd; its first public performance was at his own memorial concert the next year. It was also transcribed for large orchestra by the conductor Leopold Stokowski; this version was recorded for the first time by Matthias Bamert.

Although the movement was originally published as Marche funèbre, Chopin changed its title to simply Marche in his corrections of the first Paris edition. In addition, whenever Chopin wrote about this movement in his letters, he referred to it as a "march" instead of a "funeral march". (Note: In addition to 8 August 1839 letter to Fontana mentioned above, Chopin referred to the movement as just a "march" in a letter to his family dated 8 June 1847.) Kallberg believes Chopin's removal of the adjective funèbre was possibly motivated by his contempt for descriptive labels of his music. After his London publisher Wessel & Stapleton added unauthorised titles to Chopin's works, including The Infernal Banquet to his first scherzo in B minor (Op. 20), the composer, in a letter to Fontana on October 9, 1841, wrote:

Now concerning [Christian Rudolf Wessel], he is an ass and a cheater ... if he has lost on my compositions, it is doubtless due to the stupid titles he has given them in spite of my repeated railings to [Frederic Stapleton]; that if I listened to the voice of my soul, I would have never sent him anything more after those titles.

In 1826, a decade before he wrote this movement, Chopin had composed another Marche funèbre in C minor, which was published posthumously as Op. 72 No. 2.

=== IV. Finale: Presto ===
1–2 minutes

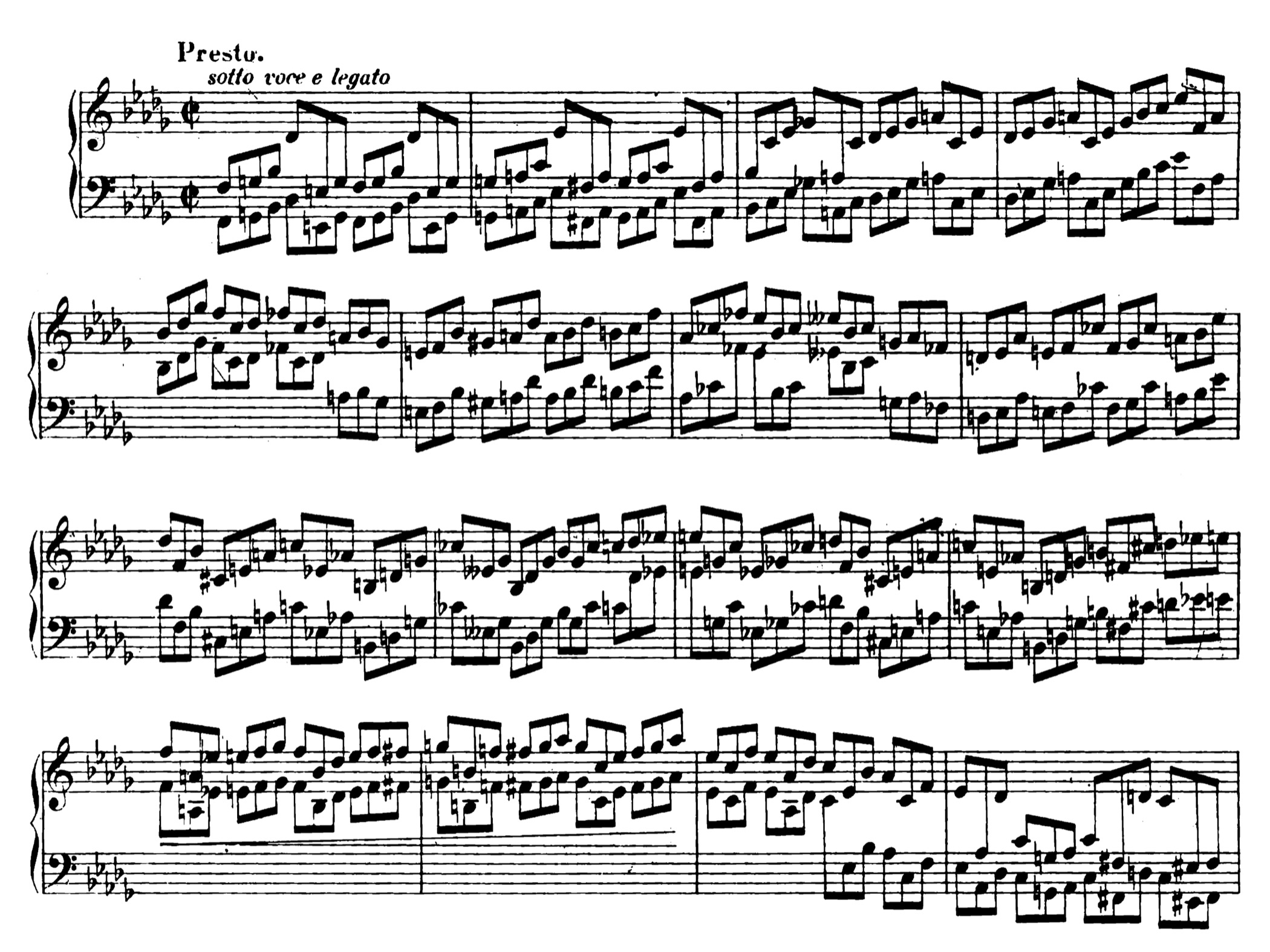
Opening of the finale

The short finale, marked Presto and in 2/2 time, is a perpetuum mobile in "relatively simple" binary form (Note: The structure, especially the harmonic aspects, of the Finale in described in detail in Rosen (1995), pp. 294–298) consisting of parallel octaves played sotto voce e legato (similarly to the Prelude in E♭ minor, Op. 28 No. 14) and not a single rest or chord until the final bars with a sudden fortissimo B♭ bass octave and a B♭ minor chord ending the whole piece. In this movement, "a complicated chromaticism is worked out in implied three- and four-part harmony entirely by means of one doubled monophonic line"; very similarly, the five measures that begin J. S. Bach's Fugue in A minor (BWV 543) imply a four-part harmony through a single monophonic line. Garrick Ohlsson remarked that the movement is "extraordinary, because he’s written the weirdest movement he's ever written in his whole life, something which truly looks to the 20th century and post-romanticism and atonality". Additionally, Leikin describes the finale as "probably the most enigmatic piece Chopin ever wrote", and Anton Rubinstein is said to have remarked that the fourth movement is the "wind howling around the gravestones".

Chopin, who wrote pedal indications very frequently, did not write any in the Finale except for the very last bar. Although Moriz Rosenthal (a pupil of Liszt and Mikuli) claimed that the movement should not be played with any pedal except where indicated in the last measure, Rosen believed that the "effect of wind over the graves", as Anton Rubinstein described this movement, "is generally achieved with a heavy wash of pedal".

=== Allusions ===
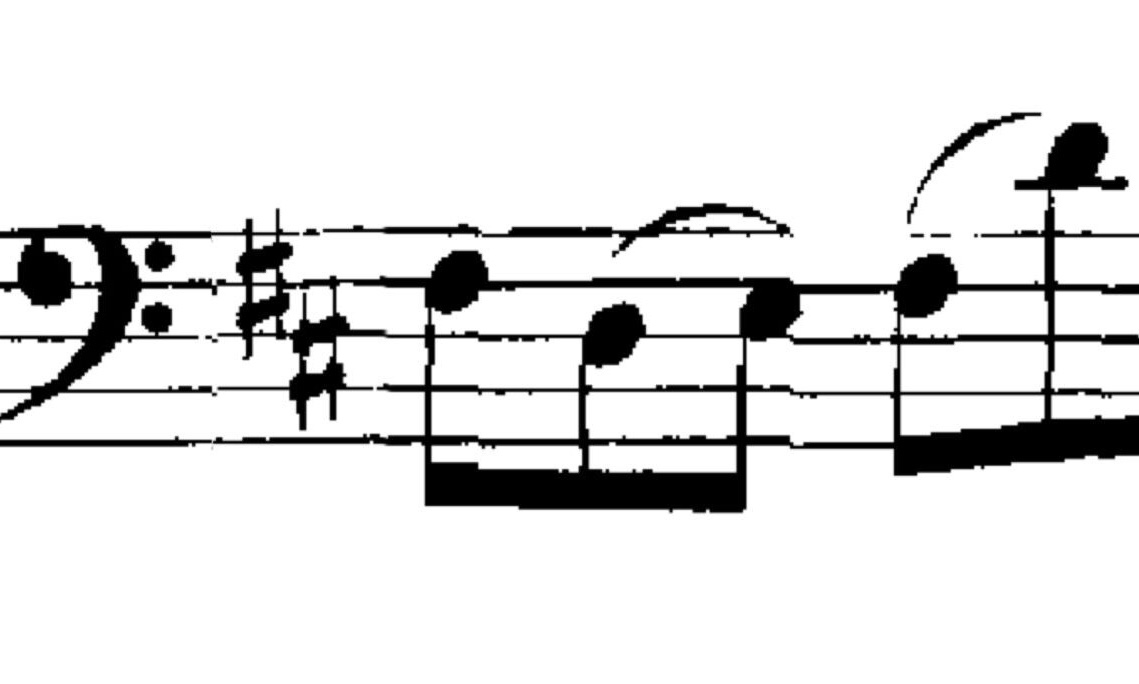
A recurring motif from the Prelude of Bach's Cello Suite No. 6 in D major, BWV 1012

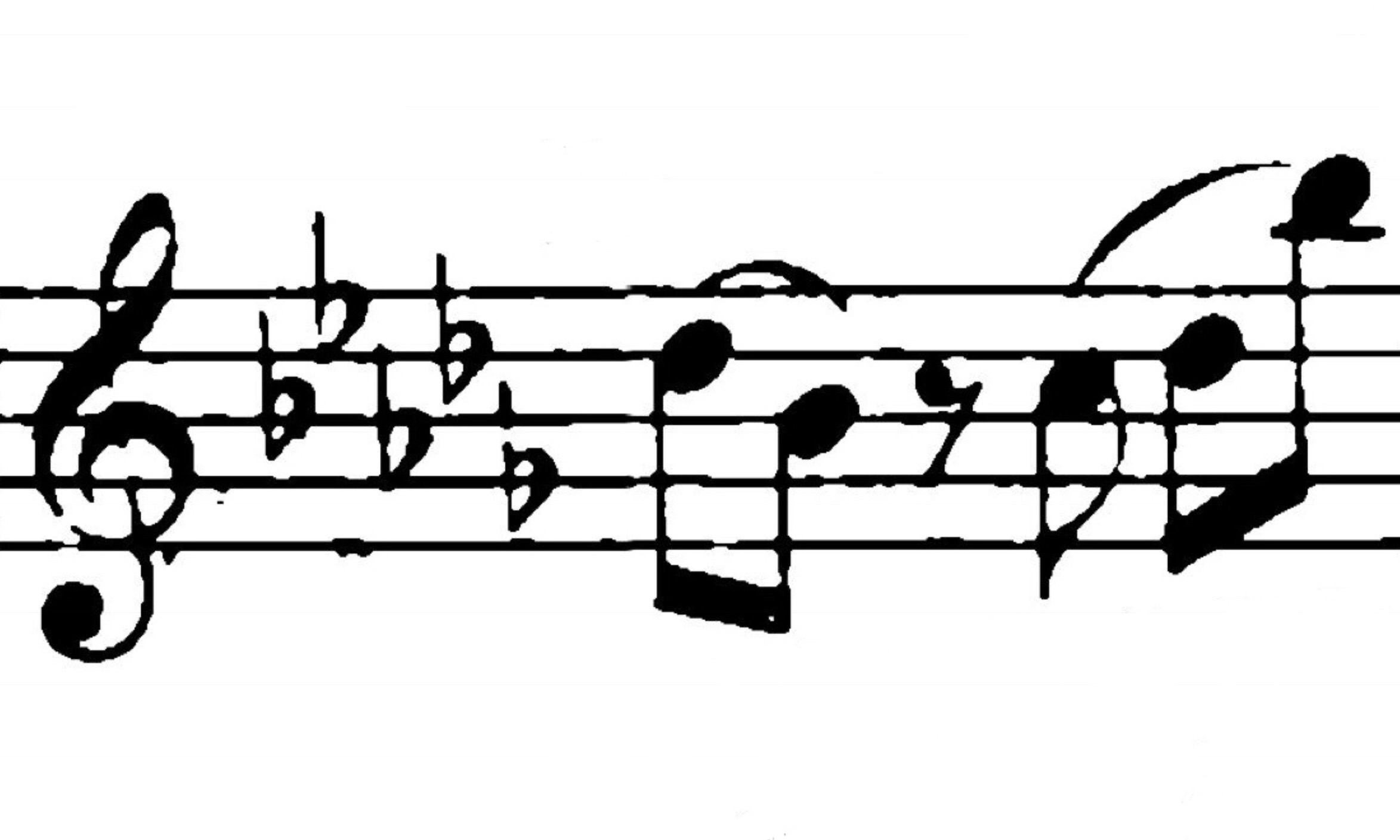
Main theme from the first movement of Chopin's Piano Sonata No. 2

The Piano Sonata No. 2 draws an allusion to the Prelude from Bach's Cello Suite No. 6 in D major, BWV 1012. A frequently repeated motif of Bach's Prelude is noticeably similar to the main theme of the first movement of Chopin's sonata; in addition, similarly to the Finale of Chopin's sonata, the Prelude is a perpetuum mobile with four groups of quaver triplets per bar. In addition, in the Finale, Chopin borrowed from Bach the craft of achieving polyphony through a monophonic line by the means of arpeggiated figures: in some respects, he even went further than Bach in this regard. In addition, the plan of Chopin's sonata directly follows that of Beethoven's Piano Sonata No. 12 in A♭ major, Op. 26, which also is in four movements and features a Marcia funèbre slow movement: like Chopin's sonata, the slow funeral march movement follows the fast scherzo second movement. Chopin is usually regarded as the Romantic era composer least influenced by Beethoven; however, Beethoven's Op. 26 was reportedly his favourite Beethoven sonata, and he played and taught it more than any other Beethoven sonata.

== Reception and legacy ==
Although the Piano Sonata No. 2 was quick to gain popularity among the public, it initially confused the critics, who found it lacked cohesion and unity, and remarked that Chopin could not quite handle sonata form. Most of the critical reviews written in the century following the work's publication were negative, although critics were still very complimentary about certain aspects of the sonata. The sonata, along with Chopin's two other mature sonatas, was performed very sporadically in Poland and other countries in Europe prior to 1900; however, the Marche funèbre by itself was performed often, both for piano and in transcriptions. It was not until the turn of the century that the sonatas were performed more often. Recent commentaries suggest that the notions that the work suffers from structural inferiority and that Chopin could not handle sonata form are slowly fading away, and it is now considered one of the greatest piano sonatas of the literature. The sonata now continues to regularly appear on concert programs and is frequently performed in classical music competitions, especially the International Chopin Piano Competition.

The first major criticism, by Robert Schumann, appeared in 1841. (Note: Schumann's complete written critique, in an English translation, is available at Oshry (1999), pp. 88–90) Schumann was critical of the work. He described the sonata as "four of [his] maddest children under the same roof" and found the title "Sonata" capricious and slightly presumptuous. He also remarked that the Marche funèbre "has something repulsive" about it, and that "an adagio in its place, perhaps in D-flat, would have had a far more beautiful effect". In addition, the finale caused a stir among Schumann and other musicians. Schumann said that the movement "seems more like a mockery than any [sort of] music", and when Felix Mendelssohn was asked for an opinion of it, he commented, "Oh, I abhor it". James Huneker remarked that the four movements of the sonata "have no common life", and that the sonata "is not more a sonata than it is a sequence of ballades and scherzi." Despite these remarks, he called the last two movements "masterpieces" and wrote that the finale has "no parallel in piano music". Similarly, James Cuthbert Hadden wrote that "the four movements, regarded separately, are admirable, but taken together they have little thematic or other affinity," and also concurred with Schumann's description of the sonata as "four of his maddest children" bound together. Henry Bidou considered the work "not very coherent", and remarked that "Schumann has pointed out the defect in its composition".

Despite the negative reaction to the work, the reception of the Marche funèbre itself was generally positive, and according to Hadden, writing in 1903, the work had been "popularised to death". Franz Liszt, a friend of Chopin's, remarked that the Marche funèbre is "of such penetrating sweetness that we can scarcely deem it of this earth", and Charles Willeby wrote that it is by far "the most beautiful and consistent movement" of the work. Despite criticising the sonata as a whole, Hadden conveyed the opinion that the Marche funèbre "is really the finest movement in the Sonata". The Marche funèbre alone continues to be one of Chopin's most enduringly popular compositions, and is performed at funerals around the world. In addition to Chopin's own funeral, it was also performed at the state funerals of John F. Kennedy, Winston Churchill, Margaret Thatcher, Queen Elizabeth II, and those of Soviet and Communist leaders, including Leonid Brezhnev, Yuri Andropov, Konstantin Chernenko and Josip Broz Tito. The movement was also played at the state funeral of Polish president Lech Kaczyński and Taiwanese president Chiang Kai-shek. In Egypt, the march is played at military and government funerals. One instance was that the piece played at the 2020 funeral of then-president Hosni Mubarak.

The sonata, mainly the Marche funèbre, played an influence in a variety of both classical and non-classical compositions written after it. The second movement of Erik Satie's Embryons desséchés, entitled "of an Edriophthalma", uses a variation on the Marche funèbre's second theme. Satie labels it "Citation de la célèbre mazurka de SCHUBERT" ("quotation from the celebrated mazurka of Schubert"), but no such piece exists. In addition, the Marche funèbre is sampled in a number of jazz compositions, including Duke Ellington's "Black and Tan Fantasy", and the Canadian electronic dance music musician deadmau5 used the theme from the Marche funèbre in his song "Ghosts 'n' Stuff". Professional wrestler The Undertaker quotes the opening of the March in his entrance theme, as part of his macabre gimmick. This sonata also influenced Sergei Rachmaninoff in his Piano Sonata No. 2 (Op. 36), also in B♭ minor. While explaining to his friends why he decided on a new 1931 version, Rachmaninoff said: "I look at my early works and see how much there is that is superfluous. Even in this sonata so many voices are moving simultaneously, and it is too long. Chopin's Sonata lasts nineteen minutes, and all has been said".

== Available editions and recordings ==
Several highly acclaimed editions are available of the Piano Sonata No. 2, most notably the editions of G. Henle Verlag, the edition edited by Ignacy Jan Paderewski, and the Chopin National Edition edited by Jan Ekier. The work has been widely performed and recorded. Two of the earliest commercial recordings of the work were made by Percy Grainger and Sergei Rachmaninoff in 1928 and 1930 respectively. Commercial recordings have also been made by such pianists as Leif Ove Andsnes, Abbey Simon, Alfred Cortot, Robert Casadesus, Vlado Perlemuter, Guiomar Novaes, Daniel Barenboim, Cécile Ousset, Alexander Brailowsky, Josef Hofmann, Leopold Godowsky, Samson François, Emil Gilels, Vladimir Horowitz, William Kapell, Wilhelm Kempff, Evgeny Kissin, George Li, Murray Perahia, Ivo Pogorelić, İdil Biret, Antonio Pompa-Baldi, Louis Lortie, Arthur Rubinstein, Mitsuko Uchida, Khatia Buniatishvili, and Chopin International Piano Competition winners Martha Argerich, Yulianna Avdeeva, Seong-Jin Cho, Maurizio Pollini, Adam Harasiewicz, Yundi, and Garrick Ohlsson.
