= Op. 27 =

In music, Op. 27 stands for Opus number 27. Compositions that are assigned this number include:

- Alkan – Le chemin de fer
- Arnold – English Dances
- Atterberg – Sonata in B minor
- Beethoven – Piano Sonata No. 13
- Beethoven – Piano Sonata No. 14
- Britten – Hymn to St Cecilia
- Castelnuovo – Naomi and Ruth
- Chopin – Nocturnes, Op. 27
- Elgar – From the Bavarian Highlands
- Elgar – Three Bavarian Dances
- Enescu – Orchestral Suite No. 3
- Grieg – String Quartet No. 1
- Klebe – Die tödlichen Wünsche
- Lover – Heimliche Aufforderung
- Mendelssohn – Calm Sea and Prosperous Voyage
- Nielsen – Symphony No. 3
- Rachmaninoff – Symphony No. 2
- Reger – Ein' feste Burg ist unser Gott
- Roussel – Joueurs de flûte
- Schumann – Lieder und Gesänge volume I (5 songs)
- Shostakovich – The Bolt
- Sibelius – King Christian II (Kuningas Kristian II), theatre score and suite (1898, revised and arranged 1898)
- Spohr – String Quartet No. 6
- Strauss – Cäcilie
- Strauss – Morgen!
- Strauss – Ruhe, meine Seele!
- Suk – Asrael Symphony
- Szymanowski – Symphony No. 3
- Waterhouse – Cello Concerto
- Webern – Variations for piano
- Wirén – Symphony No. 4 (1952)
- Ysaÿe – Six Sonatas for solo violin
  - Violin Sonata No. 2
