= Die Anarchisten =

1891 book by anarchist writer John Henry Mackay

The Anarchists
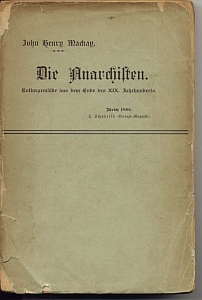
- Cover of the first edition
- Author: John Henry Mackay
- Original title: Die Anarchisten
- Translator: George Schumm
- Language: German, English
- Publisher: K. Henckell
- Publication date: 1891
- Publication place: Switzerland
- English publication date: 1891
- OCLC: 45768069
- Followed by: Der Freiheitsucher (The Freedom Seeker)

Die Anarchisten: Kulturgemälde aus dem Ende des XIX Jahrhunderts (The Anarchists: A Picture of Civilization at the Close of the Nineteenth Century) is a book by anarchist writer John Henry Mackay published in German and English in 1891. It is the best known and most widely read of Mackay's works, and made him famous overnight. Mackay made it clear in the book's subtitle that it was not intended as a novel, and complained when it was criticised as such, declaring it instead propaganda. A Yiddish translation by Abraham Frumkin was published in London in 1908 by the Worker's Friend Group, with an introduction by the journal's editor, prominent London anarchist Rudolf Rocker. It was also translated into Czech, Dutch, French, Italian, Russian, Spanish, and Swedish. Die Anarchisten had sold 6,500 copies in Germany by 1903, 8,000 by 1911, and over 15,000 by the time of the author's death in 1933.

== Content ==
Die Anarchisten is a semi-fictional account of Mackay's year in London from the spring of 1887 to that of the following year, written from the perspective of protagonist and author surrogate Carrard Auban. It chronicles Mackay's conversion to the individualist philosophy of Max Stirner, to whom the book is dedicated. In it, Mackay unfavourably counterposes the then-prevalent communist anarchism with individualist anarchism, to which he had been won over by Benjamin R. Tucker, and which Auban represents in the face of his communist counterpart Otto Trupp (whose position is akin to that of Gustav Landauer). Much of the book focuses on arguments between the anarchist advocates of violence, epitomised by Trupp, and those such as Auban who believe that propaganda of the deed inadvertently strengthens the authorities it seeks to undermine. Mackay scholar Thomas Riley comments:

In Die Anarchisten there are two contrasting characters, one of which represents a philosophy of life that is clearly communist-anarchism; the other, a more intellectual person, is an individualistic anarchist and an egoist. Through the eyes of these two men we see the horrors of life among the London poor in 1887 and the useless attempts of London radicals to wipe out the evils of the world by means of an effective social movement. Only by individualism à la Tucker and egoism à la Max Stirner can the world progress out of the misery, poverty, and wars produced by governments. The book is obviously aimed not only at the layman but also at the communist-anarchists, in an attempt to persuade them to drop their evil ways and come over to the camp of the Americans.

== Influence and reception ==
Die Anarchisten proved to be influential. According to a remark by Rocker in 1927, the book's publication in Zürich in 1891 caused considerable excitement in anarchist circles, which had hitherto been unfamiliar with any form of anarchism other than the communist anarchism they uniformly subscribed to. It firmly established Stirner's philosophy in the German anarchist movement. The book influenced Romantic composer Richard Strauss, who read it avidly and was reportedly engaged in a heated discussion concerning it hours before the opening of his first opera, Guntram.

A Companion to Twentieth-century German Literature describes the work as "a skilful portrayal of cultural life in Germany at the end of the nineteenth century". Anarchist historian Paul Avrich found the book to be "remarkable", while his counterpart George Woodcock commented that it revealed Mackay to be "a sort of inferior libertarian Gissing". In his memoirs, Austrian philosopher Rudolf Steiner wrote of the book:

This is a noble work based on faith in the individual man. It describes penetratingly and with great vividness the social condition of the poorest of the poor. But it also sets out how out of the world's misery, those men will find a way to improvement who, being wholly devoted to the good forces, so bring these forces to their unfolding that they become effective in the free association of men rendering compulsion unnecessary.

— Steiner, Rudolf, The Story of My Life

== See also ==
- Anarchist schools of thought
- The Secret Agent, a 1907 novel by Joseph Conrad set in the London anarchist scene
- List of books about anarchism

== Bibliography ==
- "Book Notes". The American Journal of Economics and Sociology. 59 (3): 537–543. July 2000. doi:10.1111/1536-7150.00042.
- Avrich, Paul (1988). Anarchist Portraits. Princeton: Princeton University Press. ISBN 0-691-00609-1.
- Fähnders, Walter (1995). "John Henry Mackay". In Hekma, Gert (ed.). Gay Men and the Sexual History of the Political Left. New York: Haworth Press. ISBN 978-1-56023-067-0.
- Furness, Raymond; Humble, Malcolm (1997). "Mackay, John Henry (1864–1933)". A companion to twentieth-century German literature (2nd ed.). London; New York: Routledge. p. 214. ISBN 0-203-36042-7. OCLC 62891879.
- Kennedy, Hubert (2002b). "Anarchist of Love: The Secret Life of John Henry Mackay" (PDF). Peremptory Publications. Archived from the original (PDF) on 2008-11-21.
- Kennedy, Michael (2006). Richard Strauss. Cambridge: Cambridge University Press. ISBN 0-521-02774-8.
- Laqueur, Walter (2001). A History of Terrorism. New Brunswick: Transaction. ISBN 0-7658-0799-8.
- Murphy, Timothy (2000). Reader's Guide to Lesbian and Gay Studies. Chicago: Fitzroy Dearborn Publishers. ISBN 1-57958-142-0.
- Riley, Thomas A. (March 1945). "Individualist Anarchism: Individualism In Middle Europe". New England Quarterly. XVIII. Archived from the original on 2012-02-07.
- Steiner, Rudolf (2003). Story of My Life. Kessinger Publishing. ISBN 0-7661-4797-5.
- Taylor, Seth (1990). Left-Wing Nietzscheans. Berlin: W. de Gruyter. ISBN 0-89925-695-3.
- Thomas, Richard Hinton (1983). Nietzsche in German Politics and Society, 1890–1918. Manchester: Manchester University Press. ISBN 0-7190-0933-2.
- Woodcock, George (2005). "Anarchism in Latin America and Northern Europe". In Horowitz, Irving (ed.). The Anarchists. New Brunswick: Aldine Transaction. ISBN 0-202-30768-9.
