= Four Last Songs =

Richard Strauss's final completed works (1948)

- by Richard Strauss
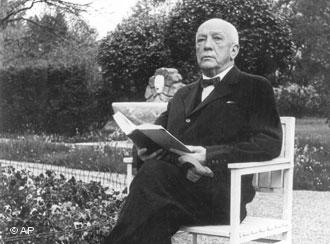
- Strauss at Garmisch in 1938
- Native name: Vier letzte Lieder
- Catalogue: TrV 296; AV 150
- Text: Hermann Hesse; Joseph von Eichendorff
- Language: German
- Composed: 1948
- Scoring: soprano; orchestra

Premiere
- Date: 22 May 1950
- Location: Royal Albert Hall, London
- Conductor: Wilhelm Furtwängler
- Performers: Kirsten Flagstad; Philharmonia Orchestra

The Four Last Songs (German: Vier letzte Lieder), Op. posth., for soprano and orchestra were composed in 1948 when Richard Strauss was 84. They are – with the exception of the song "Malven" (Mallows), composed later the same year – Strauss' final completed works.

The songs are "Frühling" (Spring), "September", "Beim Schlafengehen" (When Falling Asleep) and "Im Abendrot" (At Sunset). The title Four Last Songs was provided posthumously by Strauss's friend Ernst Roth, who published the four songs as a single unit in 1950 after Strauss's death.

Strauss died in September 1949. The premiere was given at the Royal Albert Hall in London on 22 May 1950 by soprano Kirsten Flagstad and the Philharmonia Orchestra, conducted by Wilhelm Furtwängler.

The work has no opus number. It is listed as AV 150 in Mueller von Asow's thematical index, and as TrV 296 in the index of Franz and Florian Trenner.

== Background ==
By the 1940s, Strauss's career as a composer entered a period of intense creativity, later described as an "Indian summer." After writing his last opera, Capriccio, he embarked on a number of instrumental compositions, including two sonatinas for wind instruments, the Horn Concerto No. 2, Metamorphosen, and the Oboe Concerto, written in a neoclassical idiom for smaller, Mozartian ensembles. These later works, including the more sumptuously orchestrated Four Last Songs, are seen as his final statements about music, and the links they exhibit to Strauss's earlier works, as well as some of the symbols Strauss includes in the songs, lend them a retrospective, valedictory character.

Strauss had come across the poem "Im Abendrot" by Joseph von Eichendorff, which had a special meaning for him. He set its text to music in May 1948. Strauss had also recently been given a copy of the complete poems of Hermann Hesse and was strongly inspired by them. He set three of them – "Frühling", "September", and "Beim Schlafengehen" – for soprano and orchestra, and contemplated setting two more, "Nacht" (Night) and "Höhe des Sommers" (Height of Summer), in the same manner. He also embarked on a choral setting of Hesse's "Besinnung" (Reflection), but laid it aside after the projected fugue became "too complicated".

The overall title Four Last Songs was provided by Strauss's friend Ernst Roth, the chief editor of Boosey & Hawkes, when he published all four songs as a single unit in 1950, and in the order that most performances now follow: "Frühling", "September", "Beim Schlafengehen", "Im Abendrot".

=== Sequence of the songs ===
Roth's 1950 published sequence follows neither the order of composition of the songs (Im Abendrot: May 6, 1948; Frühling: July 20, 1948; Beim Schlafengehen: August 4, 1948; September: September 20, 1948) nor that of the 1950 premiere (by Kirsten Flagstad conducted by Wilhelm Furtwängler). Although most recordings adhere to Roth, some stay with Flagstad/Furtwängler – Beim Schlafengehen, September, Frühling, Im Abendrot. The latter include Sena Jurinac's 1951 recording with the Stockholm Philharmonic conducted by Fritz Busch; Lisa Della Casa's 1953 recording with the Vienna Philharmonic under Karl Böhm; and Felicity Lott's 1986 recording with the Royal Scottish National Orchestra under Neeme Järvi. There is no authority because Strauss did not conceive a cycle, but he did entrust the premiere to Flagstad.

Order of composition	Order sung at premiere	Order in published edition
"Im Abendrot"	"Beim Schlafengehen"	"Frühling"
"Frühling"	"September"	"September"
"Beim Schlafengehen"	"Frühling"	"Beim Schlafengehen"
"September"	"Im Abendrot"	"Im Abendrot"

== Subject matter ==
All of the songs but "Frühling" deal with death and all were written shortly before Strauss himself died. They are suffused with a sense of calm, acceptance, and completeness.

The settings are for a solo soprano voice, feature soaring melodies against a full orchestra, and have prominent horn parts. The combination of a beautiful vocal line with supportive horn accompaniment references Strauss's own life; his wife Pauline de Ahna was a famous soprano and his father Franz Strauss a professional horn player.

Towards the end of "Im Abendrot", after the soprano's intonation of "Ist dies etwa der Tod?" ("Is this perhaps death?"), Strauss musically quotes his own tone poem Death and Transfiguration, written 60 years earlier. As in that piece, the quoted seven-note phrase (known as the "transfiguration theme") has been seen as the fulfillment of the soul through death.

== Instrumentation ==
The songs are scored for piccolo, 3 flutes (3rd doubling on 2nd piccolo), 2 oboes, English horn, 2 clarinets in B♭ and A, bass clarinet, 3 bassoons (3rd doubling on contrabassoon), 4 horns in F (also E♭ and D), 3 trumpets in C, E♭ and F, 3 trombones, tuba, timpani, harp, celesta, and strings.

== Premiere and first recording ==
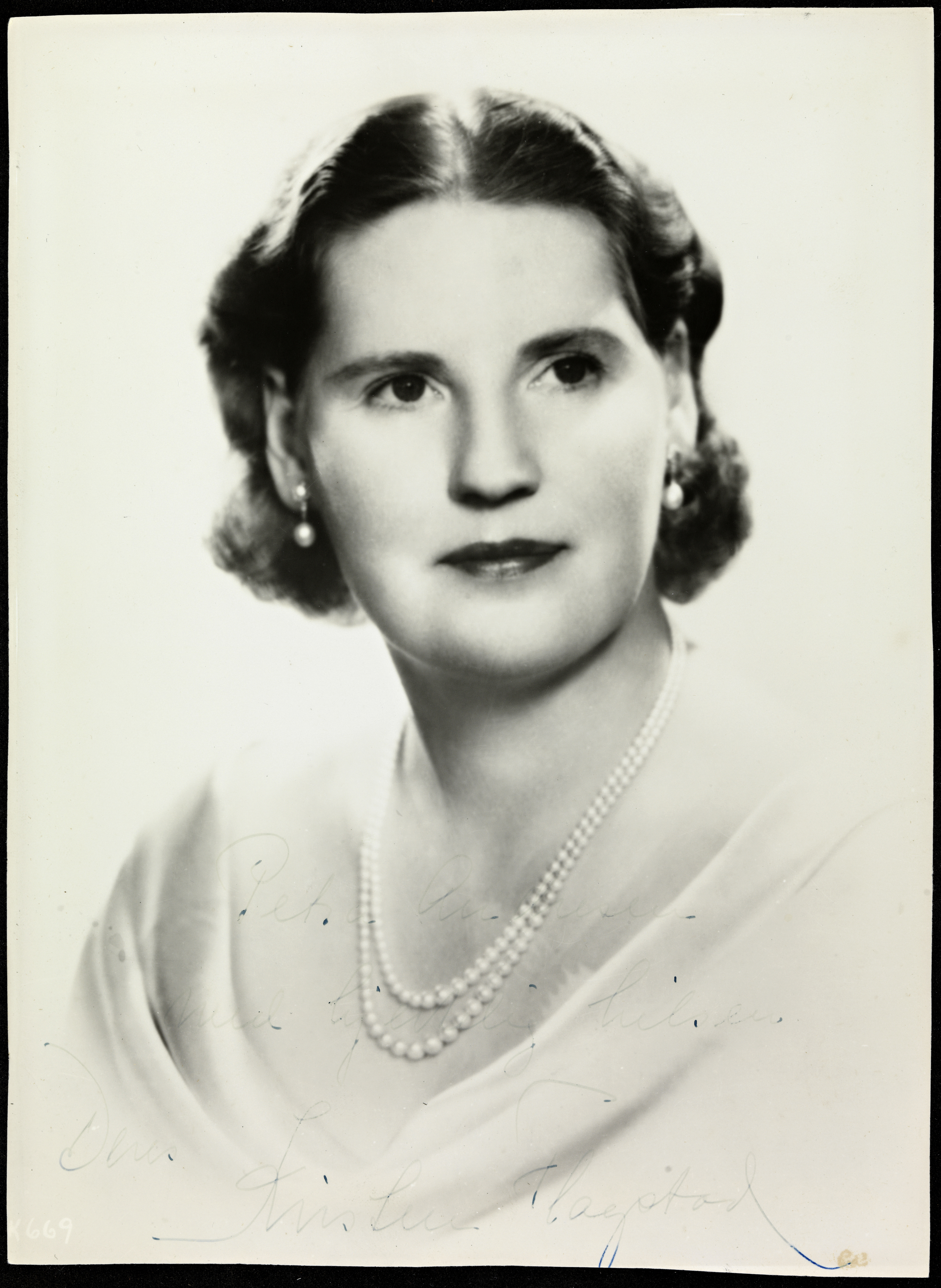
Kirsten Flagstad (c. 1945)

One of the last wishes of Richard Strauss was that Kirsten Flagstad be the soprano to introduce the four songs. "I would like to make it possible," he wrote to her, "that [the songs] should be at your disposal for a world premiere in the course of a concert with a first-class conductor and orchestra."

The premiere was given posthumously at the Royal Albert Hall in London on 22 May 1950, sung by Flagstad, accompanied by the Philharmonia Orchestra conducted by Wilhelm Furtwängler. The performance was made possible by a magnanimous offer by the Maharaja of Mysore, Jayachamarajendra Wadiyar Bahudar. Though he could not be present, the music-loving maharaja put up a $4,800 guarantee for the performance, so that the Four Last Songs could be recorded for his large personal collection – then estimated at around 20,000 records – and the recording then shipped to him in Mysore.

The performance was recorded on acetate discs. They became badly worn before the first LP transfer, which was generally considered very poor. Subsequent restorations using modern digital technology were effected in 2007 by Roger Beardsley for Testament Records, and in 2014 by Andrew Rose for Pristine Audio.

== Related songs ==
Timothy L. Jackson has noted that Strauss had composed the song "Ruhe, meine Seele!" for piano and voice in 1894 from a poem by Karl Friedrich Henckell, but did not orchestrate it until 1948, just after he had completed "Im Abendrot" and before he composed the other three of his Four Last Songs. Jackson suggests that the addition of "Ruhe, meine Seele!" to the Four Last Songs forms a five-song unified song cycle, if "Ruhe, meine Seele!" is performed as a prelude to "Im Abendrot", to which it bears motivic similarity.

== Texts ==
Note: The texts for the three songs by Hermann Hesse cannot be reproduced here until their copyright expires in 2032.

=== 4. "Im Abendrot" ===
("At sunset") (Text: Joseph von Eichendorff)

Wir sind durch Not und Freude
gegangen Hand in Hand;
vom Wandern ruhen wir beide
nun überm stillen Land.

Rings sich die Täler neigen,
es dunkelt schon die Luft.
Zwei Lerchen nur noch steigen
nachträumend in den Duft.

Tritt her und lass sie schwirren,
bald ist es Schlafenszeit.
Dass wir uns nicht verirren
in dieser Einsamkeit.

O weiter, stiller Friede!
So tief im Abendrot.
Wie sind wir wandermüde –
Ist dies etwa der Tod?

Through sorrow and joy
we have gone hand in hand;
we are both at rest from our wanderings
now above the quiet land.

Around us, the valleys bow,
the air already darkens.
Only two larks soar
musingly into the haze.

Come close, and let them flutter,
soon it will be time to sleep
so that we don't get lost
in this solitude.

O vast, tranquil peace,
so deep in the afterglow!
How weary we are of wandering –
Is this perhaps death?
