= Alexander Ritter =

German composer and violinist (1833 - 1896)

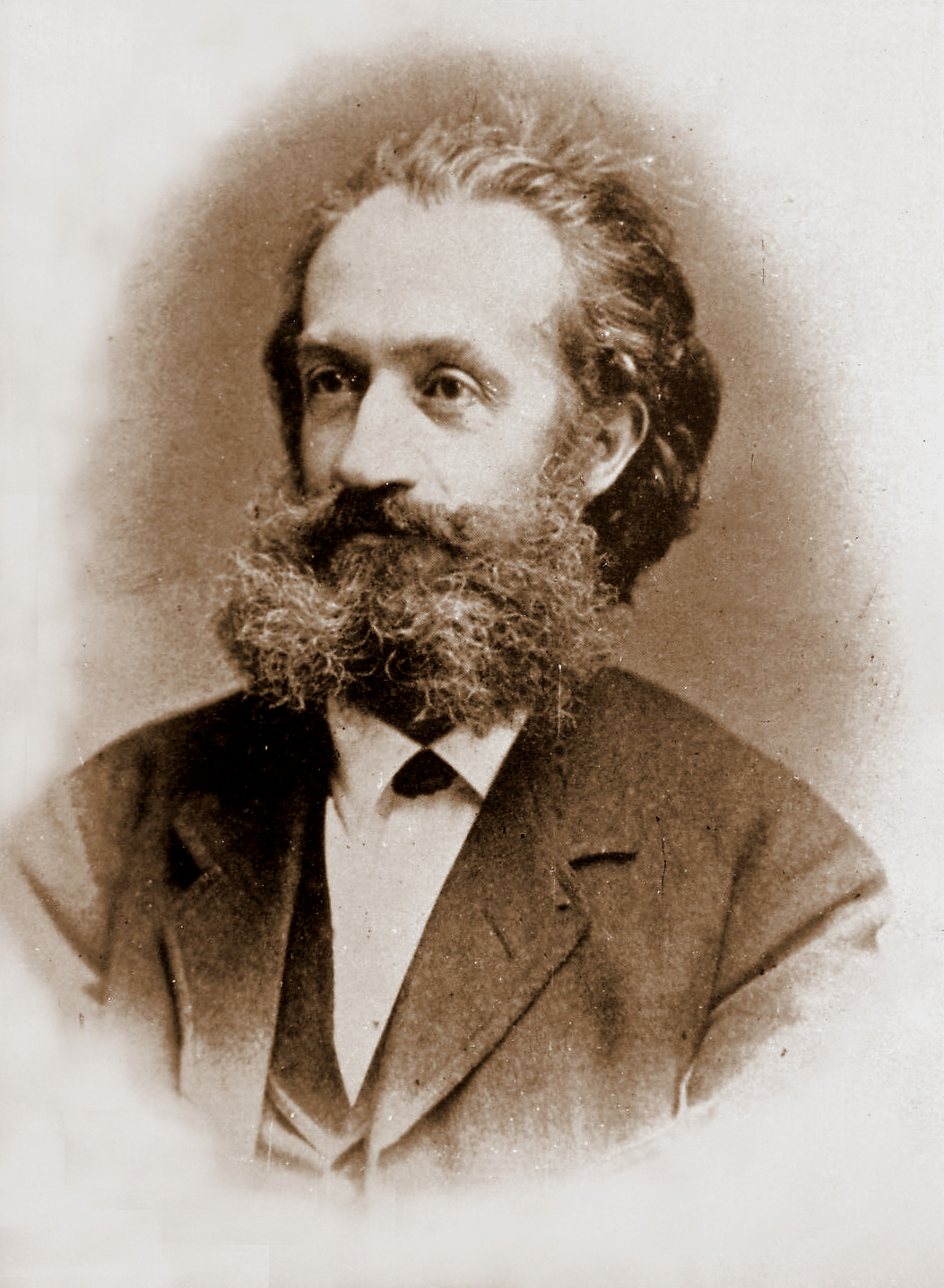
- Born: 7 June 1833; Narva, Estonia
- Died: 12 April 1896 (aged 62)
- Occupations: Composer; Violinist

Alexander Sascha Ritter (7 June 1833 – 12 April 1896) was a German composer and violinist. He wrote two operas, Der faule Hans and Wem die Krone?; a few songs; a symphonic waltz; and two symphonic fantasias. Ritter died in Munich.

== Life and career ==
He was born in Narva, Estonia. He studied in Frankfurt am Main under Joachim Raff. In 1854 he married Wagner's niece Franziska (1829–1895). They had a daughter Hertha, who in 1902 became the wife of the Austrian composer Siegmund von Hausegger.

Ritter had a strong influence on Richard Strauss. He persuaded him to abandon the conservative style of his youth, and begin writing tone poems; he also introduced Strauss to the essays of Richard Wagner and the writings of Schopenhauer. He encouraged Strauss to write his first opera Guntram, but was deeply disappointed at the final version of the libretto, which Ritter took to be a rejection of Schopenhauerian-Christian ideals.

== See also ==
- Wagner family tree
