= John Henry Mackay =

German anarchist writer (1864–1933)

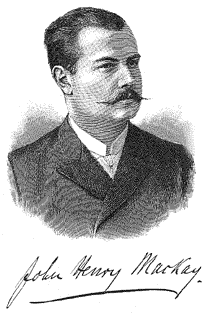
- Born: 6 February 1864; Greenock, Scotland
- Died: 16 May 1933 (aged 69); Stahnsdorf, Germany
- Occupations: Writer, philosopher
- Writing career
- Pen name: Sagitta
- Genres: Non-fiction, fiction, poetry
- Subject: Political philosophy
- Notable works: Die Anarchisten (The Anarchists); Der Freiheitsucher (The Freedomseeker)
- Movement: Naturalism

John Henry Mackay (February 6, 1864 – May 16, 1933) was a Scottish-German egoist anarchist, thinker and writer. Born in Scotland and raised in Germany, Mackay was the author of Die Anarchisten (The Anarchists, 1891) and Der Freiheitsucher (The Searcher for Freedom, 1921).

Later in life, under the pseudonym Sagitta, he became an advocate for homosexual love between men and boys.

== Biography ==
Mackay was born in Greenock, Scotland, on 6 February 1864. His mother came from a prosperous Hamburg family. His father was a Scottish marine insurance broker who died when Mackay was less than two years old. Mother and son then returned to Germany, where Mackay grew up.

He gained fame as a poet and author of naturalist novels. Some of his earliest poems attracted the attention of censors for their socialist sentiments, so Mackay republished them in Switzerland.

During a one-year stay in London (1887/88), he discovered the works of Max Stirner, whose book Der Einzige und sein Eigenthum (The Ego and its Own) had nearly been forgotten in the second half of the 19th century. Stirner soon became his life's topic. When an English translation of Stirner's work was published in 1907, James Huneker wrote: "To Mackay's labors we owe all we know of a man who was as absolutely swallowed up by the years as if he had never existed."

The publication of the novel Die Anarchisten: Kulturgemälde aus dem Ende des XIX Jahrhunderts in Zurich in 1891 and in an English translation as The Anarchists: A Picture of Civilization at the Close of the Nineteenth Century the same year brought him far wider fame. The novel "tirelessly championed" the ideas of Stirner. He further lifted this 19th century philosopher from obscurity by writing the biography Max Stirner – sein Leben und sein Werk (1898).

His novel Der Schwimmer: Die Geschichte einer Leidenschaft (The Swimmer: The Story of a Passion) (1901), was one of the first sports novels, set in the world of competitive swimming and diving. Mackay described himself as "always a passionate swimmer" thought not a sport for him. He dedicated the book to "my beloved art of swimming". The novel describes "the rise and fall of an individual who prides himself on his individuality, but who finally comes to see that individuality by itself is not enough to sustain him".

After his mother's death, he embarked on a literary project under the pseudonym Sagitta, to argue on behalf on homosexual relations between men and boys. He himself was attracted to boys aged 14 to 17. He planned to publish several volumes under the pseudonym "Sagitta", but government authorities had the early ones banned for indecency in 1909. His publisher never revealed Mackay's identity, though he was subject to fines, which Mackay paid on his behalf. Mackay published these works and additional material as Die Bücher der namenlosen Liebe von Sagitta (Sagitta's Books of the Love without a Name). Included was Fenny Skaller, an autobiographical account of his own love interests. The series was conceived in 1905 and completed in 1913. One of his themes was the variability of sexual identity and expression. He attacked the medical establishment's attempt to create categories and labels: "For physicians, people are only valuable when they are sick."

He published the novel Der Freiheitsucher (The Freedom Seeker), a sequel to Die Anarchisten, in 1920. It failed to achieve the earlier volume's success and Mackay was ruined financially by the inflation of the early Weimar years.

He nevertheless published his seventh Sagitta novel in 1926, Der Puppenjunge (The Hustler). (Note: The title was a misspelled form of a contemporary Berlin slang term for "male prostitute". Hubert Kennedy, translator of Der Puppenjunge, notes that Mackay uses the word Pupenjunge–note the spelling–repeatedly in the novel. That was the contemporary slang expression for "hustler", derived from the words pupen, to fart, and Junge, boy. It was too crude a term to use for the title, so the novel's title uses the invented word Puppenjunge, a compound of "doll" and "boy", "so as not to offend the public".) Providing a blurb for the 1985 English translation, Christopher Isherwood wrote that the novel "gives a picture of the Berlin sexual underworld early in this century which I know, from my own experience, to be authentic." It depicted the social world of "young men who prostitute themselves in Berlin, without much concern for their own sexual identity or that of their clients". In the course of a year centered on his 16th birthday, Gunther learns to survive in Berlin, selling himself and socializing with his peers, living the narrowest of lives, without plans beyond surviving another day. His counterpart Hermann, six or seven years older, "tedious and ineffectual" in one critic's view, arrives to take a job in a publishing house and is destroyed by his infatuation with Gunther. In the closing pages, a new character argues for the decriminalization of same-sex relations and tells Hermann his love for Gunther was certain to end as Gunther became a man, asserting Mackay's particular sexual interest and undercutting Hermann's sentimental vision.

He published his last novel Der Unschuldige: Die Geschichte Einer Wandlung (The Innocent: The Story of a Transformation) in 1931; it was the first work published under his own name to include homosexual characters.

A volume of his selected works was published in a single volume in 1928.

Mackay died in Stahnsdorf, a town not far from Berlin, on 16 May 1933. His will asked for his manuscripts and letters to be destroyed, and for one of his creditors to receive his unsold books. His will specified that any new printings of the Sagitta novels should be published under his own name.

A brief notice of his death in The New York Times noted he became famous in the 1890s for Anarchists and Storm (his poetry collection) and said that in Germany he was called "an anarchistic lyricist".

Mackay lived in Berlin from 1896 onwards and became a friend of Benedict Friedlaender, a scientist and the co-founder of the Gemeinschaft der Eigenen.

Mackay was published in the United States in his friend Benjamin Tucker's magazine, Liberty.

=== Adaptations ===
Max Reger set a Mackay poem as "Morgen" (Op. 66 No. 10).

Richard Strauss set two of Mackay's poems to music in his Vier Lieder for high voice and piano (Op. 27), a wedding gift to his wife in 1894, "Morgen!" and "Heimliche Aufforderung". Other settings of Mackay's poems by Strauss include "Verführung" for voice and orchestra in 1896 (Op. 33 No. 1) and "In der Campagna" for voice and piano in 1899 (Op. 41 No. 2).

Arnold Schoenberg set Mackay's poem "Am Wegrand" to music, his Op. 6 No. 6.

== Works (incomplete) ==
- Kinder des Hochlands (1885)
  - Children of the Highlands
- Anna Hermsdorf (1885)
- Sturm (1888), poetry collection, the first of several editions with additions
  - Storm
- Die Anarchisten (1891)
  - The Anarchists
- Albert Schnells Untergang. Schluß der Geschichte ohne Handlung: Die letzte Pflicht (1895)
  - Albert Schnell's Downfall. End of the Story without Plot: The Last Duty
- Max Stirner – sein Leben und sein Werk (1898)
  - Max Stirner, his Life and Work
- Der Schwimmer (1900)
  - The Swimmer
- Der Sybarit (1903)
  - The Sybarites
- Hans, mein Freund und Die Wasserratte (1910)
  - Hans, my friend and the water rat
- Der Freiheitsucher. Psychologie einer Entwicklung (ca. 1920)
  - The Freedom Seeker. psychology of development
- Der Puppenjunge (1926)
  - The Hustler
- Die namenlose Liebe, seven volumes (1906–1926)
  - The Love without a Name
- Der Unschuldige (1936)
  - The Innocent

== See also ==
- Anarchism in Germany
- Individualist anarchism in Europe

== Notes ==
"Puppenjunge" can also be translated as "Puppetboy", which suggests the main character is a puppet at the whim of his circumstances, which may have been Mackay's intent.
