= Strauss Villa =

Building in Garmisch-Partenkirchen, Germany

Coordinates: 47°29′39″N 11°04′34″E

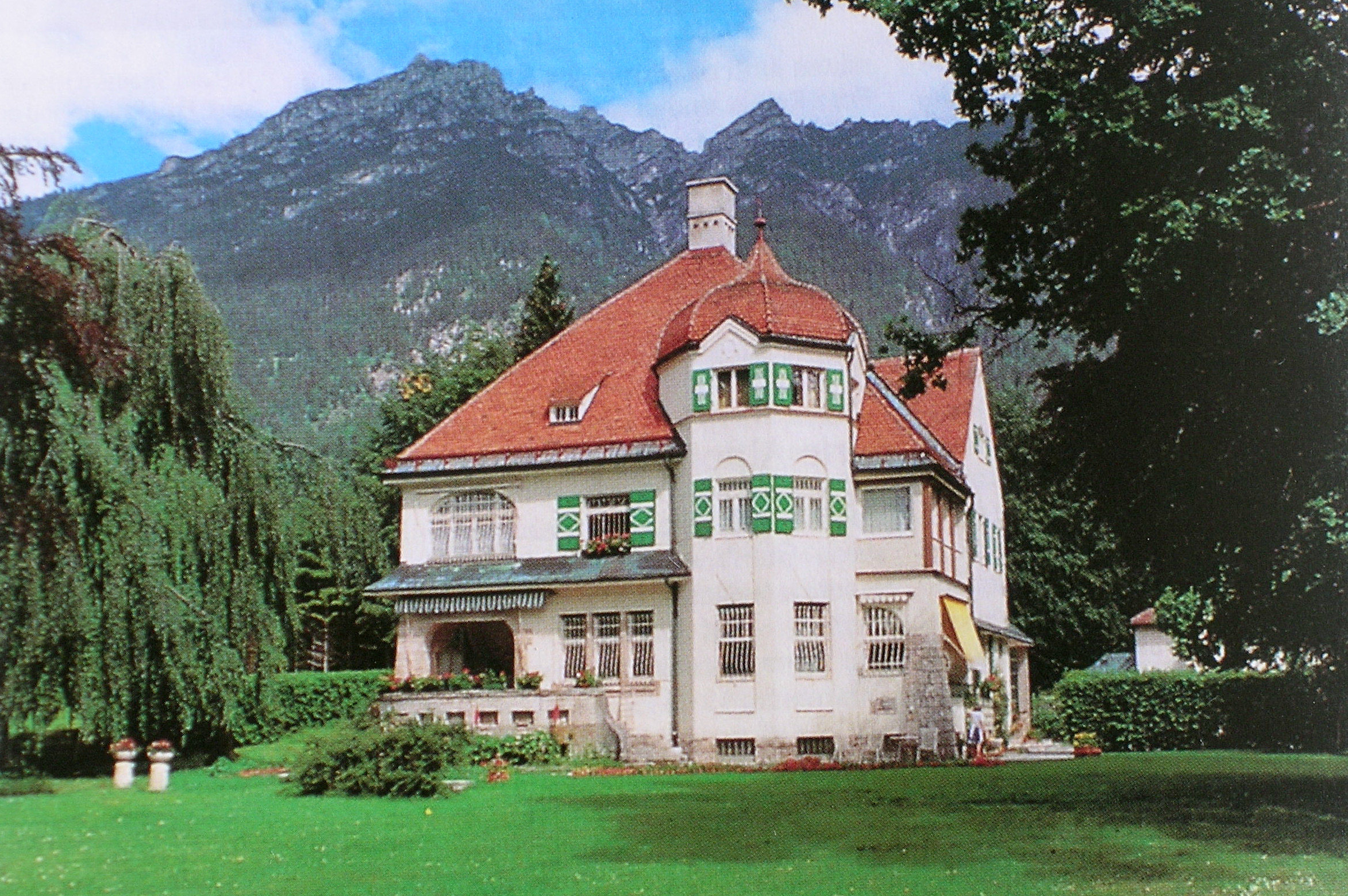
The Strauss-Villa in Garmisch-Partenkirchen

The Strauss Villa is the home of the German composer Richard Strauss in the Upper Bavarian town of Garmisch-Partenkirchen.

== History ==
Between 1907 and 1908, the Art Nouveau architect Emanuel von Seidl built the villa on the property located at Zoeppritzstraße 42 in Garmisch. Richard Strauss preferred what was then Garmisch to what used to be the neighboring town of Partenkirchen because of its cooler weather. The family used the house as a summer retreat from 1908 and later as a permanent residence. The two-storey building was created by von Seidl as a hipped roof building with a plastered structure and implementing the requirements specified by Richard and Pauline Strauss. The structure is listed building number D-1-80-117-262 under the Monument Protection Act of October 1, 1973.

== Current condition ==
Today, the villa remains a private residence maintained by the Strauss family and was the home of Strauss' grandson Christian until his death in February 2020. The study houses historical works as well as German classics. The first floor bedrooms today house an archive. The room where Strauss died now serves as a memorial.

== See also ==
- Richard Strauss
