= Pauline de Ahna =

German operatic soprano (1863–1950)

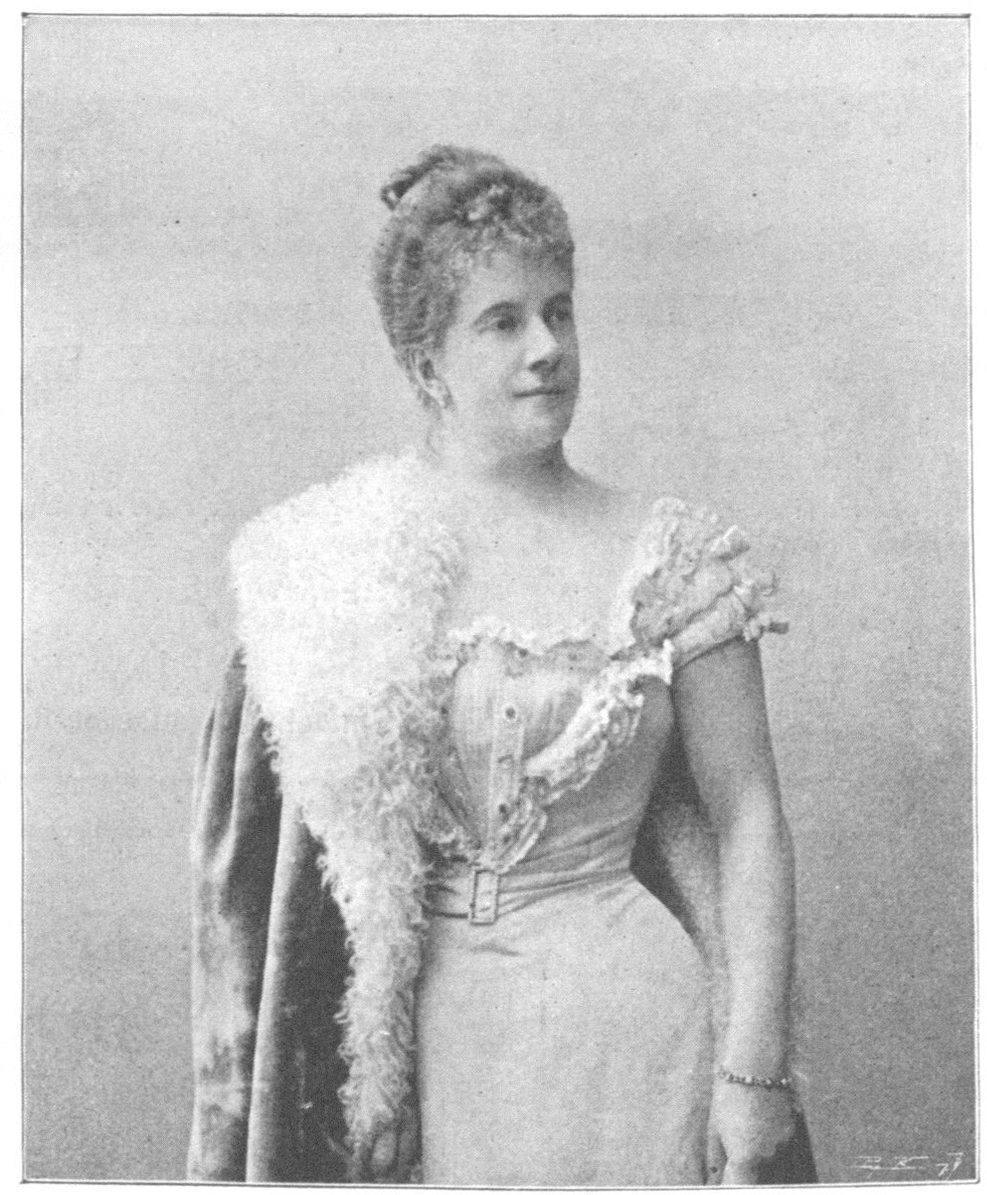
Pauline de Ahna Strauss, c. 1900

Pauline Maria de Ahna (4 February 1863 – 13 May 1950), also known as Pauline Strauss, was a German operatic soprano and the wife of composer Richard Strauss. Her singing career was closely tied to her husband's career as a conductor and composer. From 1890 until 1894 she was committed to the Staatskapelle Weimar and from 1894 until 1897 she was committed to the Bavarian State Opera, during which times her husband was the principal conductor of those theaters. She also sang with her husband conducting at the Bayreuth Festival and in the world premiere of his first opera Guntram. Other houses at which she performed included the Berlin State Opera, La Monnaie, and the Liceu. Her repertoire included leading roles in the operas of Beethoven, Humperdinck, Mozart, von Weber, and Wagner. After she gave birth to their son Franz Strauss in 1897 she retired from the opera stage. She thereafter continued to periodically perform in concerts of her husband's music, particularly Lieder. Strauss credited her as his muse for many of his compositions, including the title role in Salome, the Countess Madeleine in Capriccio, and the Four Last Songs among others.

== Biography ==
De Ahna was born in Ingolstadt, the daughter of General Adolf de Ahna. Her career was closely tied to Richard Strauss's both before and after their marriage. She was trained at the Munich Musikschule (now the University of Music and Performing Arts Munich) where Franz Strauss, Richard's father, was a professor of the horn. There she became acquainted with Richard in 1887 while he was a conductor for the Bavarian State Opera, and she soon after began studying voice with him privately. When Richard was appointed Kapellmeister to Charles Alexander, Grand Duke of Saxe-Weimar-Eisenach in Weimar in the Autumn of 1889 she went with him, and it is under his direction that she made her professional opera debut in 1890 as Pamina in Mozart's The Magic Flute at the Staatskapelle Weimar. Also in Weimar, she created the role of Freihild in Strauss's first opera, Guntram and sang the roles of Eva in Die Meistersinger von Nürnberg and Hansel in Hansel and Gretel.

When Richard made his conducting debut with Richard Wagner's Tannhäuser at the Bayreuth Festival 1894, it was with Pauline as Elisabeth. There she also sang a flowermaiden in Parsifal. Other opera houses in which she sang as a guest artist include the Badisches Staatstheater Karlsruhe, the Berlin State Opera, the Hamburg State Opera, La Monnaie, the Liceu, and the Staatstheater Braunschweig. Pauline and Richard were wed on 10 September 1894 in Munich. Richard gave Pauline as a wedding present the four songs of Opus 27: "Ruhe, meine Seele!", "Cäcilie", "Heimliche Aufforderung" and "Morgen!". When Richard returned to the Bavarian State Opera in 1894, she became a principal singer there until her last opera performance in 1897. Roles she performed in Munich included, Agathe in Der Freischütz, Leonore in Fidelio, Donna Anna in Don Giovanni, and Ada in Wagner's Die Feen.

Strauss, De Ahna and their son, Franz, 1910

In 1897, the couple's only child, their son Franz, was born. After this, de Ahna no longer performed in operas, but continued to sing in concerts of Lieder with her husband as pianist. In 1904 they gave one such concert at Carnegie Hall in New York City, and also gave performances at concert halls in Boston, Chicago, Cleveland, Pittsburgh, and Washington D.C. In 1906, the couple purchased a block of land at Garmisch-Partenkirchen and had a villa (Strauss Villa) built there with the down payments from the publisher Adolph Fürstner for Richard's opera Salome. They both resided there for most of the rest of their lives, with the exception of time spent at a property they owned nearer Vienna, and some time spent in Switzerland directly after World War II. De Ahna outlived her husband, but only by eight months, dying in Garmisch-Partenkirchen in May 1950.

De Ahna was famous for being eccentric, snobbish, ill-tempered and outspoken. Strauss described her as "very complex, very feminine, a little perverse, a little coquettish, never like herself, at every minute different from how she had been a moment before". However, the marriage was happy and she was a great source of inspiration to her husband in works up to and including the Four Last Songs. In particular, Strauss portrayed de Ahna both as the hero's companion in Ein Heldenleben and in several sections of Symphonia Domestica. Strauss's opera Intermezzo (Dresden, 1924) provides a thinly veiled portrait of their marriage, and Strauss credited his wife's voice as a muse for the roles of Salome and the Countess Madeleine in Capriccio.

The singer Eleonore de Ahna was her aunt.

== Legacy ==
She was the subject of the one-woman show Die Frau im Schatten, performed by Dame Gwyneth Jones at the 2004 Strauss Festival in Garmisch-Partenkirchen.
