= Heimliche Aufforderung =

Composition by Richard Strauss

- Lied by Richard Strauss
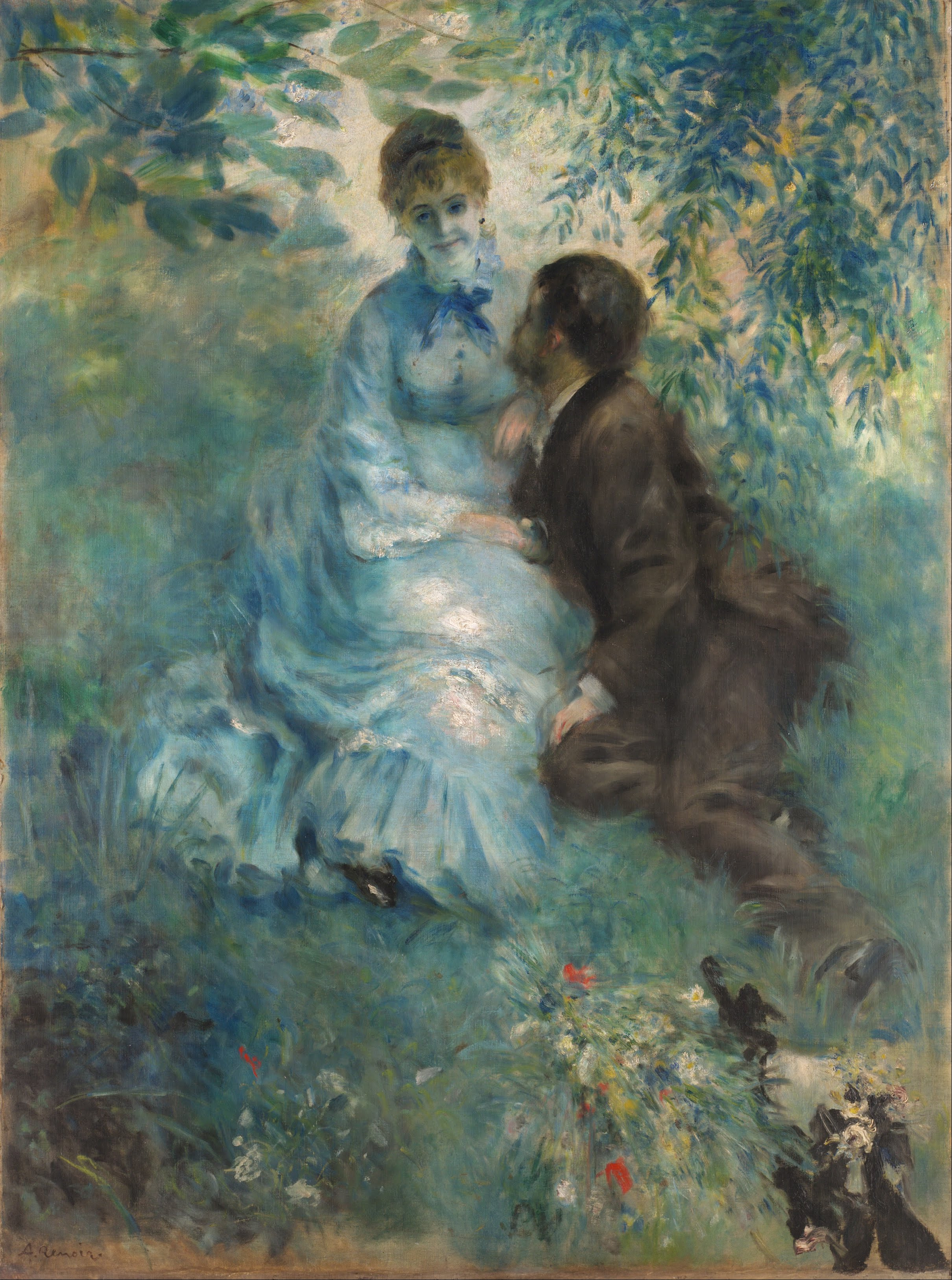
- Lovers, by Pierre-Auguste Renoir, 1875
- English: "The Secret Invitation", "The Lovers' Pledge"
- Catalogue: TrV 170
- Opus: 27, No. 3
- Text: Poem by John Henry Mackay
- Language: German
- Composed: 22 May 1894.
- Dedication: Pauline de Ahna, composer's wife
- Scoring: Voice and piano

"Heimliche Aufforderung" ("The Secret Invitation" or "The Lovers; Pledge"), Op. 27, No. 3, is one of a set of four songs composed for voice and piano by Richard Strauss in 1894. The German conductor Robert Heger orchestrated it in 1929. The text is from a poem in German by John Henry Mackay.

== History ==
Strauss composed the song on 22 May 1894 and gave it as a wedding present to his wife, the soprano Pauline de Ahna. During their American tour in 1904, Pauline Strauss sang this song as the concluding piece in her Carnegie Hall debut on 1 March.

Strauss recorded the orchestral version in 1941 with Julius Patzak (tenor) and the Bavarian State Orchestra, and in 1944 the piano version with himself accompanying Alfred Poell (baritone).

== Music ==
The song is written with a time signature of 6/8 time and in the key of G-flat major and several modulations (it has been transposed into several other key); the tempo indication is Lebhaft (lively). The vocal range is from B♮_{3} to E♮_{5}, an interval of an octave + a fourth. The music takes briefly a recitative character in two places ("Verachte sie nicht zu sehr" and "den Durst gestillt .. festfreudiges Bild"). The accompaniment is highly pianistic and Strauss himself never orchestrated it, unlike the other three songs of this cycle. Heger's orchestration has been described as "lacklustre".

== Lyrics ==
Strauss altered three words slightly: the originals are in square brackets. The song describes a man wooing a woman amidst a crowd of drinking carousers and his invitation to a later tryst.

Heimliche Aufforderung

Auf, hebe die funkelnde Schale empor zum Mund,
Und trinke beim Freudenmahle dein Herz gesund.
Und wenn du sie hebst, so winke mir heimlich zu,
Dann lächle ich und dann trinke ich still wie du...

Und still gleich mir betrachte um uns das Heer
Der trunknen Zecher [Schwätzer] – verachte sie nicht zu sehr.
Nein, hebe die blinkende Schale, gefüllt mit Wein,
Und laß beim lärmenden Mahle sie glücklich sein.

Doch hast du das Mahl genossen, den Durst gestillt,
Dann verlasse der lauten Genossen festfreudiges Bild,
Und wandle hinaus in den Garten zum Rosenstrauch,
Dort will ich dich dann erwarten nach altem Brauch,

Und will an die Brust dir sinken, eh du's gehofft [erhofft],
Und deine Küsse trinken, wie ehmals oft,
Und flechten in deine Haare der Rose Pracht.
O komm [komme], du wunderbare, ersehnte Nacht!
O komm, du wunderbare, ersehnte Nacht!
—John Henry Mackay (1864–1933)

The Lover's Pledge

Up, lift now the sparkling gold cup to the lip, and drink!
and leave not a drop in the goblet fill'd full to the brink.
And as thou dost pledge me, let thine eyes rest on me,
then I will respond to thy smile and gaze all silent on thee.

Then let thy eyes bright wander around o'er
the comrades gay and merry. O do not despise them, love;
Nay! lift up the sparkling gold goblet and join the sway,
let them rejoice and be happy, this festive day.

But, when thou hast drunk and eaten, no longer stay;
rise and turn thine eyes from the drinkers, and hasten away!
And wending thy steps to the garden, where blush the roses fair,
come the sheltering arbour! I'll meet thee there,

And soft on thy bosom resting let me adore
thy beauty, drink thy kisses as oft before.
I'll twine around thy fair forehead the roses white.
O, come, thou wondrous blissbestowing longed-for night!
O, come, thou wondrous blissful, thou longed-for night!
—Translation: John Bernhoff

== Instrumentation and accompaniment ==
Orchestration by Heger: 2 flutes, 2 oboes, 2 clarinets, bass clarinet, 2 bassoons, 4 horns, 2 trumpets, 1 trombone, percussion, harp and string section

== Opus 27 ==
The other songs of Opus 27 are:

- No. 1 "Ruhe, meine Seele!" (Nicht ein Lüftchen regt sich leise)
- No. 2 "Cäcilie" (Wenn du es wüßtest)
- No. 4 "Morgen!" (Und morgen wird die Sonne wieder scheinen)
