= Oboe Concerto (Strauss) =

1945 musical composition by Richard Strauss

Concerto in D major for Oboe and Small Orchestra
- Concerto by Richard Strauss
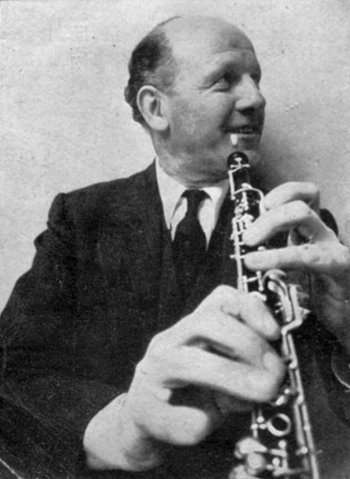
- Léon Goossens, who played oboe on the first recording in 1948
- Key: D major
- Catalogue: TrV 292
- Composed: Completed 25 October 1945
- Dedication: Volkmar Andreae and the Tonhalle Orchester Zürich
- Scoring: double wind, 2 horns and strings

The Concerto in D major for Oboe and Small Orchestra, AV 144, TrV 292, was written by Richard Strauss in 1945. It was one of the last works he composed near the end of his life, during what is often described by biographers, journalists and music critics as his "Indian summer."

== Inception and premiere ==
American oboist John de Lancie was a corporal in the U.S. Army unit which secured the area round the Bavarian town of Garmisch where Strauss was living in April 1945, in the closing days of World War II. As principal oboist of the Pittsburgh Orchestra in civilian life, he knew Strauss's orchestral writing for oboe thoroughly, visited the composer in his home, and in the course of a long conversation asked him if he had ever considered writing an oboe concerto. Strauss answered simply "No", and the topic was dropped. However, in the months to follow, the idea grew on him and he completed the short score of his Oboe Concerto on September 14, 1945, finishing the orchestration on October 25.

The work was premiered on 26 February 1946 in Zürich, featuring Marcel Saillet as soloist with the Tonhalle Orchester conducted by Volkmar Andreae. The British premiere was at the Proms on 17 September 1946 with the oboist Léon Goossens and the BBC Symphony Orchestra conducted by Sir Adrian Boult. As the concerto was being prepared for print in early 1948, Strauss revised and expanded its last-movement coda. The first recording was made in 1948 with Goossens and the Philharmonia Orchestra, conducted by Alceo Galliera (in the version without the final revisions).

John de Lancie had been astonished to see that Strauss was indeed publishing an oboe concerto. Strauss saw to it that the rights to the U.S. premiere were assigned to de Lancie, who after the war had switched to the Philadelphia Orchestra and was only a junior member there. Protocol made de Lancie's performing the premiere impossible since the Philadelphia Orchestra's principal oboist had priority. De Lancie instead gave the rights to the U.S. premiere to a young oboist friend at the CBS Symphony Orchestra in New York, Mitch Miller, who later became famous as a music producer and host of a sing-along TV show.

John de Lancie later became the principal oboist for the Philadelphia Orchestra. His only public performance of the Concerto was the company premiere of the piece on August 30, 1964 at the Interlochen Center for the Arts in Michigan, with Eugene Ormandy conducting. In 1987, de Lancie had the opportunity to record the work he helped inspire with a small orchestra identified only as "Chamber Orchestra" conducted by Max Wilcox on the RCA label.

== Music ==
The concerto is scored for oboe solo with an orchestra of two flutes, cor anglais, two clarinets, two bassoons, two horns, and strings.

The concerto consists of three interconnected movements and lasts around 25 minutes:

1. Allegro moderato – D major
2. Andante – B♭ major, much later changed to D major
3. Vivace – Allegro – D major

=== Analysis ===
The tonal disposition of the movements is D major, B♭ major, D major. Juergen May has observed that "it is obvious that Strauss takes as his point of departure here the Classical and early-Romantic models of his musical youth. The composer looks back to a past aesthetic from the perspective of someone who has lived through the paradigm changes of the nineteenth and twentieth centuries. In this sense one might call the last works of Strauss postmodern."

As with his other late works, Strauss builds up the music from a series of small melodic ideas "which are the point of departure for the development of the entire composition." The concerto is built up from three main thematic elements. The first is the 4 semiquavers D–E–D–E which opens the piece in the cellos. The second is a long note (minim) followed a playful figure of shorter durational values (semi-quavers). The third is a repetition short-short-short long followed by different variants of continuations. This motif echoes the rhythm of the Fate motif of Beethoven's Fifth symphony and "clearly refers to Metamorphosen, completed just before the Oboe Concerto – a remarkable example of the thematic links between the last instrumental works". However, it also relates back to Strauss's use of the rhythm of the Fate motif in the first movement of his youthful Piano Sonata written over 60 years earlier in 1881. The finale ends with a surprise: after the second cadenza, Strauss concludes with a dance-like Allegro in 6/8 meter which comes across as a fourth movement with a character of its own.
