= Cäcilie (Strauss) =

1894 song composed by Richard Strauss

- Lied by Richard Strauss
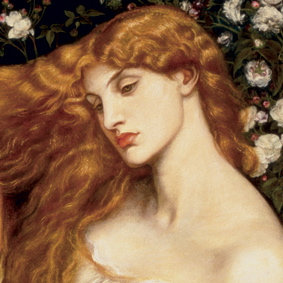
- Lady Lilith by Rossetti (1866).
- English: Cecilia or Cecily
- Catalogue: TrV 170
- Opus: 27, No. 2
- Text: Poem by Heinrich Hart
- Language: German
- Composed: September 9, 1894
- Dedication: Pauline de Ahna, composer's wife.
- Scoring: Voice and piano

"Cäcilie", Op. 27 No. 2, is the second in a set of four songs composed by Richard Strauss in 1894.

The words are from a love poem "Cäcilie" written by Heinrich Hart (1855–1906), a German dramatic critic and journalist who also wrote poetry. It was written for the poet's wife Cäcilie.

German pronunciation: [tsɛːˈtsiː.liːə], or UK English as "Cecilia".

== History ==
Strauss composed the song at Marquartstein on 9 September 1894. , the day before his wedding to the soprano Pauline de Ahna. All four of the Opus 27 songs, including Cäcilie were given as a wedding present to her.

== Instrumentation and accompaniment ==
The song was originally written with piano accompaniment in the key of E major, but later orchestrated in his 'heroic' key of E♭. The instrumentation is: 2 flutes, 2 oboes, 2 clarinets in B♭, 2 bassoons, 4 horns in E♭, 2 trumpets in E♭, 3 trombones, tuba, 3 timpani, harp and the orchestral string section.

The tempo direction is "Sehr lebhaft und drängend".

Strauss, in his rich and lively orchestration, included parts for a solo string player from each section.

The change of key a semitone down from E to E♭ explains why, from bar 34 on the violas are asked to play the note B, a semitone below the lowest note normally possible on the instrument; and at this point Strauss asks half the violas to tune this string down a semitone. For the same reason the full score, bar 39, gives the second flute the note B, a semitone lower than its normal lowest note.

== Lyrics ==
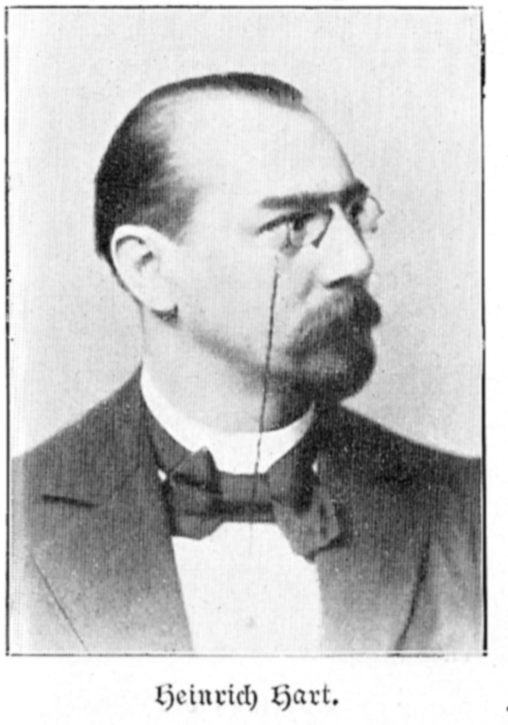
Author of the lyrics, Heinrich Hart (1855-1906)

Cäcilie

Wenn du es wüßtest,
Was träumen heißt von brennenden Küssen,
Von wandern und ruhen mit der Geliebten,
Aug in Auge,
Und kosend und plaudernd,
Wenn du es wüßtest,
Du neigtest dein Herz!

Wenn du es wüßtest,
Was bangen heißt in einsamen Nächten,
Umschauert vom Sturm, da niemand tröstet
Milden Mundes die kampfmüde Seele,
Wenn du es wüßtest,
Du kämest zu mir.

Wenn du es wüßtest,
Was leben heißt, umhaucht von der Gottheit
weltschaffendem Atem,
Zu schweben empor, lichtgetragen,
Zu seligen Höhn,
Wenn du es wüßtest, wenn du es wüßtest,
Du lebtest mit mir.

Cecilia

If you but knew, sweet,
what ‘tis to dream of fond, burning kisses,
of wand’ring and resting with the belov’d one;
gazing fondly
caressing and chatting,
could I but tell you,
your heart would assent.

If you but knew, sweet,
the anguish of waking thro' nights long and lonely
and rocked by the storm when no-one is near
to soothe and comfort the strife weary spirit.
Could I but tell you,
you’d come, sweet, to me.

If you but knew, sweet,
what living is, in the creative breath of
God, Lord and Maker
to hover, upborne on dove-like pinions
to regions of light,
if you but knew it, could I but tell you,
you’d dwell, sweet, with me.

== Opus 27 ==
The other songs of Strauss' Opus 27:

- Op. 27 No. 1 "Ruhe, meine Seele!" (Nicht ein Lüftchen regt sich leise)
- Op. 27 No. 3 "Heimliche Aufforderung" (Auf, hebe die funkelnde Schale)
- Op. 27 No. 4 "Morgen!" (Und morgen wird die Sonne wieder scheinen)

== Recordings ==
There are many recordings of this, one of Strauss's most popular songs. Richard Strauss recorded it in once in 1944, accompanying the Austrian soprano Maria Reining on the piano.
