= Karl Friedrich Henckell =

German author, poet, and publisher

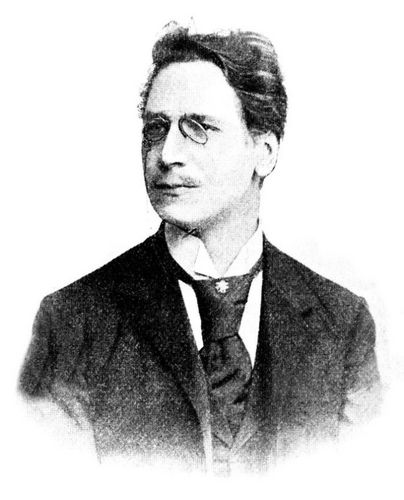
Karl Friedrich Henckell, c. 1900

Karl Friedrich Henckell (17 April 1864, Hanover – 30 July 1929, Lindau) was a German author, poet, and publisher.

Henckell studied at the Friedrich Wilhelm University of Berlin, Heidelberg University, the Ludwig-Maximilians-Universität München, and the University of Zurich. He lived abroad, in Switzerland, in Zurich and much later Muri (Bern), in Italy (Milan), and in Belgium (Brussels), and was well acquainted with the modern literatures of Europe, on which he frequently lectured, besides giving readings from his own poems. From 1896 until 1905, he was his own publisher, as well as the publisher of other literature, in Zurich and Leipzig. He settled in Munich in 1908. His poetry is revolutionary and socialistic in its tendency.

The composer Richard Strauss set nine of Henckell's poems to music, the first one in 1894, "Ruhe, meine Seele!" (Rest, my soul).

== Works ==
- Skizzenbuch (1884)
- Strophen (1887)
- Diorama (1889); a collected edition in 1898
- Gipfel und Gründe (1904)
- Mein Lied (1906)
- Schwingungen (1907)
- Im Weitergehn (1911)
