= Ruhe, meine Seele! =

Song composed by Richard Strauss

- Lied by Richard Strauss
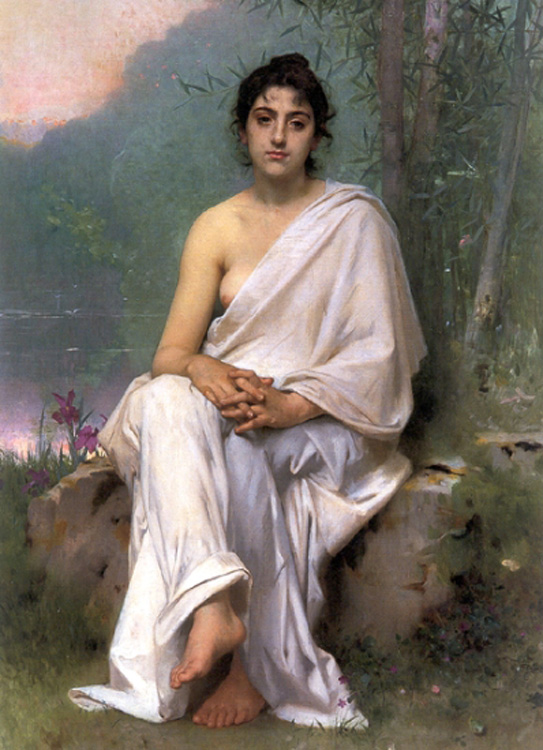
- Meditation by Perrault, 1893.
- English: Rest, my soul
- Catalogue: TrV 170
- Opus: 27, No. 1
- Text: Poem by Karl Henckell
- Language: German
- Composed: May 17, 1894, Weimar.
- Dedication: Pauline de Ahna, composer's wife.
- Scoring: Voice and piano

"Ruhe, meine Seele!", Op. 27, No. 1, is the first in a set of four songs composed by Richard Strauss in 1894. It was originally for voice and piano, and not orchestrated by Strauss until 1948, after he had completed one of his Four Last Songs, "Im Abendrot". The words are from a poem "Ruhe, meine Seele!" (Rest, my soul) written by the poet Karl Henckell.

== History ==
Strauss composed the song in May 1894, and that September he gave it as a wedding present to his wife the soprano Pauline de Ahna.

== Related songs ==
Timothy L. Jackson has noted that Strauss had composed the song "Ruhe, meine Seele!" for piano and voice in 1894 but did not orchestrate it until 1948, just after he had completed "Im Abendrot" and before he composed the other three of his Four Last Songs. Jackson suggests that the addition of "Ruhe, meine Seele!" to the Four Last Songs forms a five-song unified song cycle, if "Ruhe, meine Seele!" is performed as a prelude to "Im Abendrot", to which it bears motivic similarity.

== Instrumentation and accompaniment ==
The instrumentation is: piccolo, 2 flutes, 2 oboes, cor anglais, 2 clarinets in B♭, bass clarinet, 2 bassoons, 4 horns in F, 2 trumpets in C, 3 trombones, tuba, 3 timpani, celesta, harp and the orchestral string section.

The accompaniment has sombre and ambiguous harmonies, with contrasting calm and tempestuous episodes, but ends peacefully in the home key of C major.

== Lyrics ==
Ruhe, meine Seele!

Nicht ein Lüftchen
Regt sich leise,
Sanft entschlummert
Ruht der Hain;
Durch der Blätter
Dunkle Hülle
Stiehlt sich lichter
Sonnenschein.

Ruhe, ruhe,
Meine Seele,
Deine Stürme
Gingen wild,
Hast getobt und
Hast gezittert,
Wie die Brandung,
Wenn sie schwillt.

Diese Zeiten
Sind gewaltig,
Bringen Herz
Und Hirn in Not –
Ruhe, ruhe,
Meine Seele,
Und vergiß,
Und vergiß,
Was dich bedroht!

Rest thee, my Soul

Not a breath of wind
is stirring,
Hill and Dale
are wrapped in slumber;
Golden through the
sheltering foliage
Summer's Midday
sunbeams peep.

Rest thee, rest thee
troubled spirit,
Thou hast suffered
laboured, toiled,
Thou hast fought
and thou has trembled,
like the stormbeat,
ocean wild.

These times
are momentous,
head and heart
must trouble bear –
Rest thee, rest thee
troubled spirit
and forget
all thy sufferings
will soon be over!

== Opus 27 ==
The other songs of Opus 27 are:

- Op. 27 No. 2 "Cäcilie" (Wenn du es wüßtest)
- Op. 27 No. 3 "Heimliche Aufforderung" (Auf, hebe die funkelnde Schale)
- Op. 27 No. 4 "Morgen!" (Und morgen wird die Sonne wieder scheinen)

== Recordings ==
Richard Strauss recorded it twice with himself accompanying on the piano. In 1919 with the baritone Heinrich Schlusnus and again in 1944, with the baritone Alfred Poell.
