= Morgen! =

Song composed by Richard Strauss

- Lied by Richard Strauss
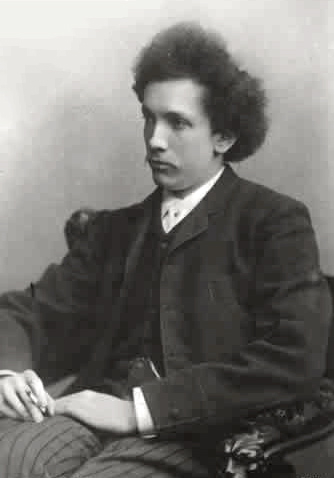
- Strauss in 1894
- English: "Tomorrow!"
- Key: G major
- Catalogue: TrV 170
- Opus: 27/4
- Text: Poem by John Henry Mackay
- Language: German
- Composed: 1894
- Dedication: Pauline de Ahna
- Scoring: Voice and piano

"Morgen!" ("Tomorrow!") is the last in a set of four songs composed in 1894 by the German composer Richard Strauss. It is designated Opus 27, Number 4.

The text of this Lied, the German love poem "Morgen!", was written by Strauss's contemporary, John Henry Mackay, who was of partly Scottish descent but brought up in Germany.

== History ==
Strauss had met Mackay in Berlin, and set Morgen! to music on 21 May 1894. It was one of his four Lieder Opus 27, a wedding present to his wife Pauline. Initially, he set the accompaniment for piano alone, and for piano with violin. In 1897 he arranged the piece for orchestra with violin solo.

"Morgen!" remains one of Strauss's best-known and most widely recorded works. Strauss himself recorded it in 1919 accompanying the tenor Robert Hutt on the piano, and again in 1941 conducting the orchestral version with tenor Julius Patzak and the Bavarian State Orchestra. His last recording of it was 11 June 1947, a live broadcast on radio with Strauss conducting the Orchestra della Svizzera Italiana and soprano Annette Brun.

== Instrumentation of accompaniment ==
Strauss wrote the song originally to be accompanied by piano. In 1897 he orchestrated the accompaniment for orchestral strings plus a solo violin, a harp, and three horns. The orchestral strings are muted, and the dynamic throughout is pianissimo or softer. The harp, playing arpeggios, and the solo violin accompany continuously until the word "stumm", at which point the horns enter. The violin and harp reenter after "Schweigen', and the horns fall silent until the last few bars. The last chord is joined by a solo horn. A performance lasts about 3 1/2 minutes.

== Text ==
The poem, with minor changes by Strauss, reads as follows:

Morgen!
Und morgen wird die Sonne wieder scheinen
und auf dem Wege, den ich gehen werde,
wird uns, die Glücklichen sie wieder einen
inmitten dieser sonnenatmenden Erde...
und zu dem Strand, dem weiten, wogenblauen,
werden wir still und langsam niedersteigen,
stumm werden wir uns in die Augen schauen,
und auf uns sinkt des Glückes stummes Schweigen...

Literal translation:

Tomorrow!
And tomorrow the sun will shine again
and on the way that I will go,
she will again unite us, the happy ones
amidst this sun-breathing earth,
and to the beach, wide, wave-blue
will we still and slowly descend
silently we will look in each other's eyes
and upon us will sink the mute silence of happiness

Poetic English translation:

Tomorrow!
Tomorrow again will shine the sun
And on my sunlit path of earth
Unite us again, as it has done,
And give our bliss another birth...
The spacious beach under wave-blue skies
We'll reach by descending soft and slow,
And mutely gaze in each other's eyes,
As over us rapture's great hush will flow.

English edition by John Bernhoff, 1925 Universal Edition:

Tomorrow!
Tomorrow's sun will rise in glory beaming,
And in the pathway that my foot shall wander,
We'll meet, forget the earth, and lost in dreaming,
Let heav'n unite a love that earth no more shall sunder...
And towards that shore, its billows softly flowing,
Our hands entwined, our footsteps slowly wending,
Gaze in each other's eyes in love's soft splendour glowing,
Mute with tears of joy and bliss ne'er ending...

== Opus 27 ==
The other three songs of Strauss's Opus 27 are:

- No. 1 "Ruhe, meine Seele!" (Nicht ein Lüftchen regt sich leise)
- No. 2 "Cäcilie" (Wenn du es wüßtest)
- No. 3 "Heimliche Aufforderung" (Auf, hebe die funkelnde Schale)
