= Guntram (opera) =

1894 opera by Richard Strauss

- Opera by Richard Strauss
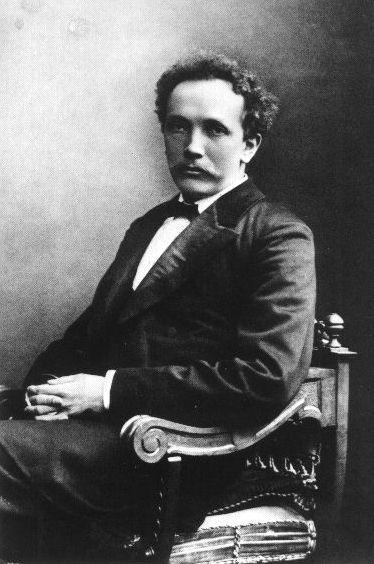
- Strauss
- Librettist: Strauss
- Language: German
- Premiere: 10 May 1894; Grossherzogliches Hoftheater, Weimar

Guntram (Op. 25) is an opera in three acts by Richard Strauss with a German libretto written by the composer. The second act of the opera was composed in Ramacca, Sicily.

It was Strauss' first opera and shows a strong Wagnerian influence. The music of Guntram is quoted in Strauss's tone poem Ein Heldenleben. The composer revised the score in 1940.

== Performance history ==
The opera was not very successful, and was only staged a few times during Strauss' lifetime:

The first performance took place on 10 May 1894 at the Grossherzogliches Hoftheater in Weimar. The soprano role of Freihild was sung by Pauline de Ahna, Strauss's future wife. Later performances conducted by Strauss included those in Munich on 16 November 1895 and in Prague on 9 October 1901. A performance in Frankfurt was given on 9 March 1910 conducted by Ludwig Rottenberg.

The revised version was first given in Weimar on 29 October 1940, conducted by Paul Sixt, and later in 1942 in Berlin conducted by Robert Heger.

In Hamburg, on 4 February 1895, Gustav Mahler included the prelude to act 1 in his 6th Philharmonic Concert. He included the preludes to acts 1 and 2 in a concert in Vienna on 19 February 1899, and in New York City on 30 March 1910 with the New York Philharmonic.

The works is score for 3 flutes (3rd doubling piccolo), 3 oboes (3rd doubling English horn), 3 clarinets (3rd doubling bass clarinet), 3 bassoons, contrabassoon, 4 horns, 3 trumpets, bass trumpet, 3 trombones, tuba, timpani (2 drums), percussion (5 players), bass drum, tenor drum, triangle, cymbals (large and small), lute, 2 harps, and strings (16, 16, 12, 10, 8 players).

== Roles ==
Roles, voice types, premiere cast
Role	Voice type	Premiere cast, 10 May 1894 Conductor: Richard Strauss
The old Duke	bass	Karl Bucha
Freihild, his daughter	soprano	Pauline de Ahna, then Strauss's fiancée
Duke Robert, her husband	baritone	Franz Schwarz
Guntram, singer	tenor	Heinrich Zeller
Friedhold, singer	bass	Ferdinand Wiedey
The Duke's jester	tenor	Hans Gießen
An old woman	contralto	Luise Tibelti
An old man	tenor	Hr. Lutz
Two younger men	basses	Hr. Barth, Hermann Buche
Three vassals	basses	Hr. Fischer, Hr. Schustherr, Hr. Henning
A messenger	baritone	Hermann Buche
Four Minnesingers	tenors, basses	Hr. v. Szpinger, Hr. Knöfler, Hr. Glitsch, Hr. Weyrauch
Vassals, Minnesingers, monks, servants, vagrants

== Synopsis ==
Set in medieval Germany, the triangular Wagnerian-style story of love and redemption is about the minstrel Guntram, the evil Duke Robert and his saintly wife Freihild. (The story is not connected with the Merovingian king Guntram of Burgundy.)

== Recordings ==
Year	Cast: Guntram, Freihild, The Old Duke, Duke Robert, Friedhold	Conductor, Opera house and orchestra	Label
1981	William Lewis, Carole Farley, Patrick Wheatley, Terence Sharpe, John Tomlinson	John Pritchard; BBC Symphony Orchestra and BBC Singers	CD: Gala; Cat: GL 100787
1984	Reiner Goldberg, Ilona Tokody, Sandor Solyom-Nagy, Istvan Gati, Janos Bandi	Eve Queler; Hungarian State Orchestra	CD: Sony Music; Cat: 88697448162
2005	Gian Luca Zampieri, Elena Comotti, Andrea Martin, Raphael Sigling, Thomas Gazheli	Gustav Kuhn; Tirol Festival, Erl Orchestra and male chorus (Live recording)	DVD: Col Legno; 80004
