= Richard Strauss =

German composer and conductor (1864–1949)

- Strauss in 1904
- Born: 11 June 1864; Munich, German Confederation
- Died: 8 September 1949 (aged 85); Garmisch-Partenkirchen, Germany
- Occupations: Composer; conductor
- Works: List of compositions
- Spouse: Pauline de Ahna

Richard Georg Strauss (/straʊs/; German: [ˈʁɪçaʁt ˈʃtʁaʊs]; 11 June 1864 – 8 September 1949) was a German composer and conductor known for his tone poems and operas. He was a leading figure of the late Romantic and early Modern era.

His first tone poem to achieve wide acclaim was Don Juan. This was followed by other lauded works of this kind, including Death and Transfiguration, Till Eulenspiegel's Merry Pranks, Also sprach Zarathustra, Don Quixote, Ein Heldenleben, Symphonia Domestica, and An Alpine Symphony. His first opera to achieve international fame was Salome. This was followed by Elektra, Der Rosenkavalier, Ariadne auf Naxos, Die Frau ohne Schatten, Die ägyptische Helena, Arabella, Daphne, Friedenstag, Die Liebe der Danae and Capriccio. Other well-known works by Strauss include two symphonies, lieder (especially the Four Last Songs), the Violin Concerto in D minor, the Horn Concertos Nos. 1 and 2, his Oboe Concerto, and other instrumental works such as Metamorphosen.

A prominent conductor in Western Europe and the Americas, Strauss enjoyed quasi-celebrity status as his compositions became standards of orchestral and operatic repertoire. He was chiefly admired for his interpretations of the works of Liszt, Mozart, and Wagner in addition to his own works. A conducting disciple of Hans von Bülow, Strauss began his conducting career as Bülow's assistant with the Meiningen Court Orchestra in 1883. After Bülow resigned in 1885, Strauss served as that orchestra's primary conductor for five months before being appointed to the conducting staff of the Bavarian State Opera. He served as principal conductor of the Deutsches Nationaltheater und Staatskapelle Weimar from 1889 to 1894. In 1894 he made his conducting debut at the Bayreuth Festival. He returned to the Bavarian State Opera before becoming principal conductor of the Berlin State Opera and then the Vienna State Opera. In 1920 he co-founded the Salzburg Festival.

In 1933 Strauss was appointed to two important musical positions in Nazi Germany: head of the Reichsmusikkammer and principal conductor of the Bayreuth Festival. These positions have led some to criticize Strauss for his seeming collaboration with the Nazis. However, Strauss's daughter-in-law was Jewish, and much of his apparent acquiescence to the Nazi Party was done to save her life and the lives of her children. He was also apolitical, and took the Reichsmusikkammer post to advance copyright protections for composers, attempting as well to preserve performances of works by banned composers. Further, Strauss insisted on using a Jewish librettist, Stefan Zweig, for his opera Die schweigsame Frau which ultimately led to his firing from the Reichsmusikkammer and Bayreuth in 1935, just two years after his appointment. Strauss's opera Friedenstag, which premiered just before the outbreak of World War II, was a thinly veiled criticism of the Nazi Party that attempted to persuade Germans to abandon violence for peace. Thanks to his influence, his daughter-in-law was placed under protected house arrest during the war, but despite extensive efforts he was unable to save dozens of his in-laws from being killed in Nazi concentration camps. In 1948, a year before his death, he was cleared of any wrongdoing by a denazification tribunal in Munich.

== Early life and career (1864–1886) ==
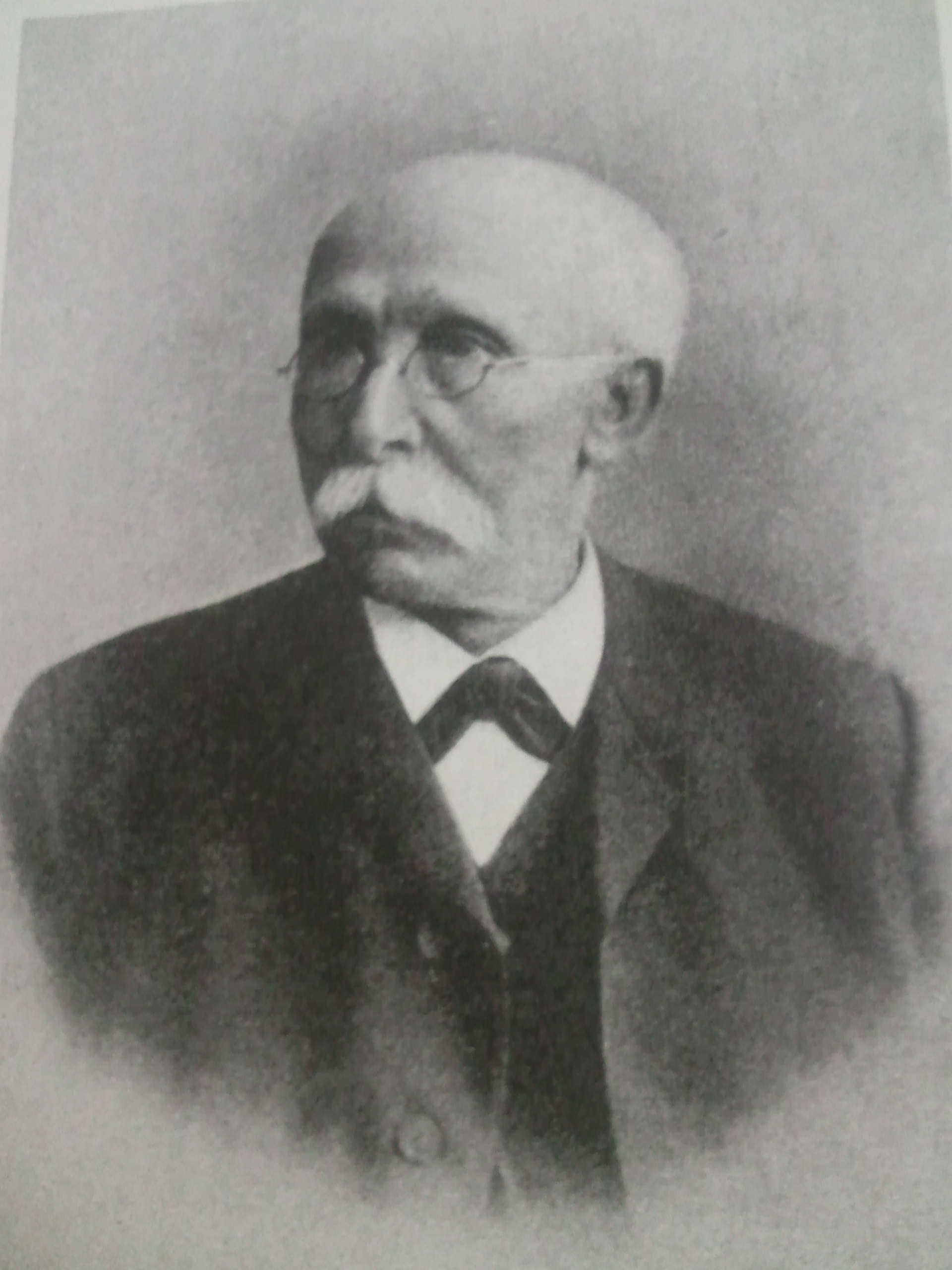
Franz Strauss, father of Richard Strauss

Strauss was born on 11 June 1864 in Munich, the son of Josephine (née Pschorr) and Franz Strauss, who was the principal horn player at the Court Opera in Munich and a professor at the Königliche Musikschule. His mother was the daughter of Georg Pschorr, a financially prosperous brewer from Munich.

A child prodigy in composition, Strauss began his musical studies at the age of four, studying piano with August Tombo who was the harpist in the Munich Court Orchestra. Soon after, he began attending the rehearsals of the orchestra, and began getting lessons in music theory and orchestration from the ensemble's assistant conductor. He wrote his first composition at the age of six, and continued to write music almost until his death. In 1872, he started receiving violin instruction from Benno Walter, the director of the Munich Court Orchestra and his father's cousin, and at 11 began five years of compositional study with Friedrich Wilhelm Meyer. In 1882 he graduated from the Ludwigsgymnasium and afterwards attended only one year at the Ludwig-Maximilians-Universität München in 1882–1883.

In addition to his formal teachers, Strauss was profoundly influenced musically by his father who made instrumental music-making central to the Strauss home. The Strauss family was frequently joined in their home for music making, meals, and other activities by the orphaned composer and music theorist Ludwig Thuille who was viewed as an adopted member of the family. Strauss's father taught his son the music of Beethoven, Haydn, Mozart, Schubert and Weber. His father further assisted his son with his musical composition during the 1870s and into the early 1880s, providing advice, comments, and criticisms.

His father also provided support by showcasing his son's compositions in performance with the Wilde Gung'l, an amateur orchestra he conducted from 1875 to 1896. Many of his early symphonic compositions were written for this ensemble. His compositions at this time were indebted to the style of Robert Schumann and Felix Mendelssohn, true to his father's teachings. His father undoubtedly had a crucial influence on his son's developing taste, not least in Strauss's abiding love for the horn. His Horn Concerto No. 1 is representative of this period and is a staple of the modern horn repertoire.

In 1874, Strauss heard his first Wagner operas, Lohengrin and Tannhäuser. In 1878 he attended performances of Die Walküre and Siegfried in Munich, and in 1879 he attended performances of the entire Ring Cycle, Die Meistersinger von Nürnberg, and Tristan und Isolde. The influence of Wagner's music on Strauss's style was to be profound, but at first his musically conservative father forbade him to study it. In the Strauss household, the music of Richard Wagner was viewed with deep suspicion, and it was not until the age of 16 that Strauss was able to obtain a score of Tristan und Isolde. In 1882 he went to the Bayreuth Festival to hear his father perform in the world premiere of Wagner's Parsifal; after which surviving letters to his father and to Thuille detail his seemingly negative impression of Wagner and his music. In later life, Strauss said that he deeply regretted the conservative hostility to Wagner's progressive works.

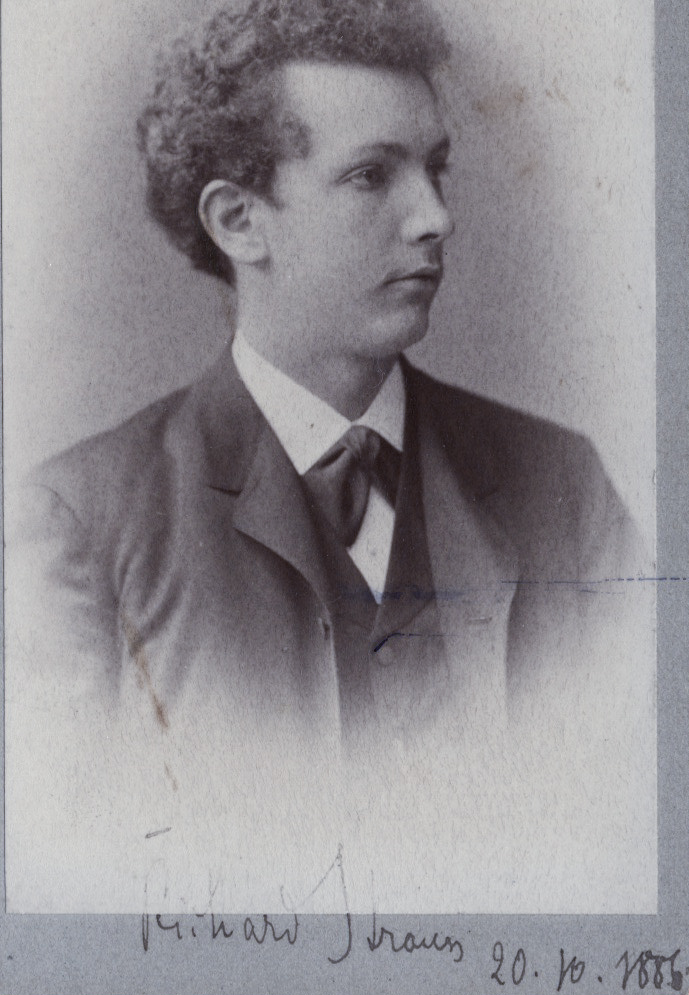
Strauss aged 22

In early 1882, in Vienna, Strauss gave the first performance of his Violin Concerto in D minor, playing a piano reduction of the orchestral part himself, with his teacher Benno Walter as soloist. The same year he entered the Ludwig-Maximilians-Universität München, where he studied philosophy and art history, but not music. He left a year later to go to Berlin, where he studied briefly before securing a post with the Meiningen Court Orchestra as assistant conductor to Hans von Bülow, who had been enormously impressed by the young composer's Serenade (Op. 7) for wind instruments, composed when he was only 16 years of age.

Strauss learned the art of conducting by observing Bülow in rehearsal. Bülow was very fond of the young man, and Strauss considered him as his greatest conducting mentor, often crediting him as teaching him "the art of interpretation". Notably, under Bülow's baton he made his first major appearance as a concert pianist, performing Mozart's Piano Concerto No. 24, for which he composed his own cadenzas.

In December 1885, Bülow unexpectedly resigned from his post, and Strauss was left to lead the Meiningen Court Orchestra as interim principal conductor for the remainder of the artistic season through April 1886. He notably helped prepare the orchestra for the world premiere performance of Johannes Brahms's Symphony No. 4, which Brahms himself conducted. He also conducted his Symphony No. 2 for Brahms, who advised Strauss: "Your symphony contains too much playing about with themes. This piling up of many themes based on a triad, which differ from one another only in rhythm, has no value."

Brahms' music, like Wagner's, also left a tremendous impression upon Strauss, and he often referred to this time of his life as his 'Brahmsschwärmerei' ('Brahms adoration') during which several his compositions clearly show Brahms' influence, including the Piano Quartet in C minor, Op. 13 (1883–84), Wandrers Sturmlied (1884) and Burleske (1885–86)."

== Success in conducting and tone poems (1885–1898) ==
In 1885, Strauss met the composer Alexander Ritter who was a violinist in the Meiningen orchestra and the husband of one of Richard Wagner's nieces. An avid champion of the ideals of Wagner and Franz Liszt, Ritter had a tremendous impact on the trajectory of Strauss's work as a composer from 1885 onward. Ritter convinced Strauss to abandon his more conservative style of composing and embrace the "music of the future" by modeling his compositional style on Wagner and Liszt. He further influenced Strauss by engaging him in studies and conversations on the writings of Arthur Schopenhauer, Wagner, and Friedrich von Hausegger. All of this together gave a new aesthetic anchor to Strauss which first became evident in his embrace of the tone poem genre.

In 1886, after leaving his post in Meiningen, Strauss spent several weeks traveling throughout Italy before assuming a new post as third conductor at the Bavarian State Opera, then known as the Munich Hofoper. While traveling he wrote down descriptions of the various sites he was seeing along with tonal impressions that went with those descriptions. These he communicated in a letter to his mother, and they ultimately were used as the beginning of his first tone poem, Aus Italien (1886). Shortly after Strauss assumed his opera conducting duties in Munich, Ritter himself moved to the city in September 1886. For the next three years the two men met regularly, often joined by Thuille and Anton Seidl, to discuss music, particularly Wagner and Liszt, and discuss poetry, literature, and philosophy.

Strauss's tenure at the Bavarian State Opera was not a happy one. With the death of Ludwig II of Bavaria in June 1886, the opera house was not as well financially supported by his successor Otto of Bavaria which meant that much of the more ambitious and expensive repertoire that he wanted to stage, such as Wagner's operas, were unfeasible. The opera assignments he was given, works by Boieldieu, Auber and Donizetti, bored him, and to make matters worse Hermann Levi, the senior conductor at the house, was often ill and Strauss was required to step in at the last minute to conduct performance for operas which he had never rehearsed. This caused problems for him, the singers, and the orchestra.

During this time, Strauss found much more enjoyable conducting work outside Munich in Berlin, Dresden, and Leipzig. In Leipzig he met and befriended the composer Gustav Mahler in the autumn of 1887. Also happily, Strauss met his future wife, soprano Pauline de Ahna, in 1887. De Ahna was then a voice student at the Munich Musikschule, now the University of Music and Performing Arts Munich, but soon switched to private lessons with Strauss, who became her principal teacher.

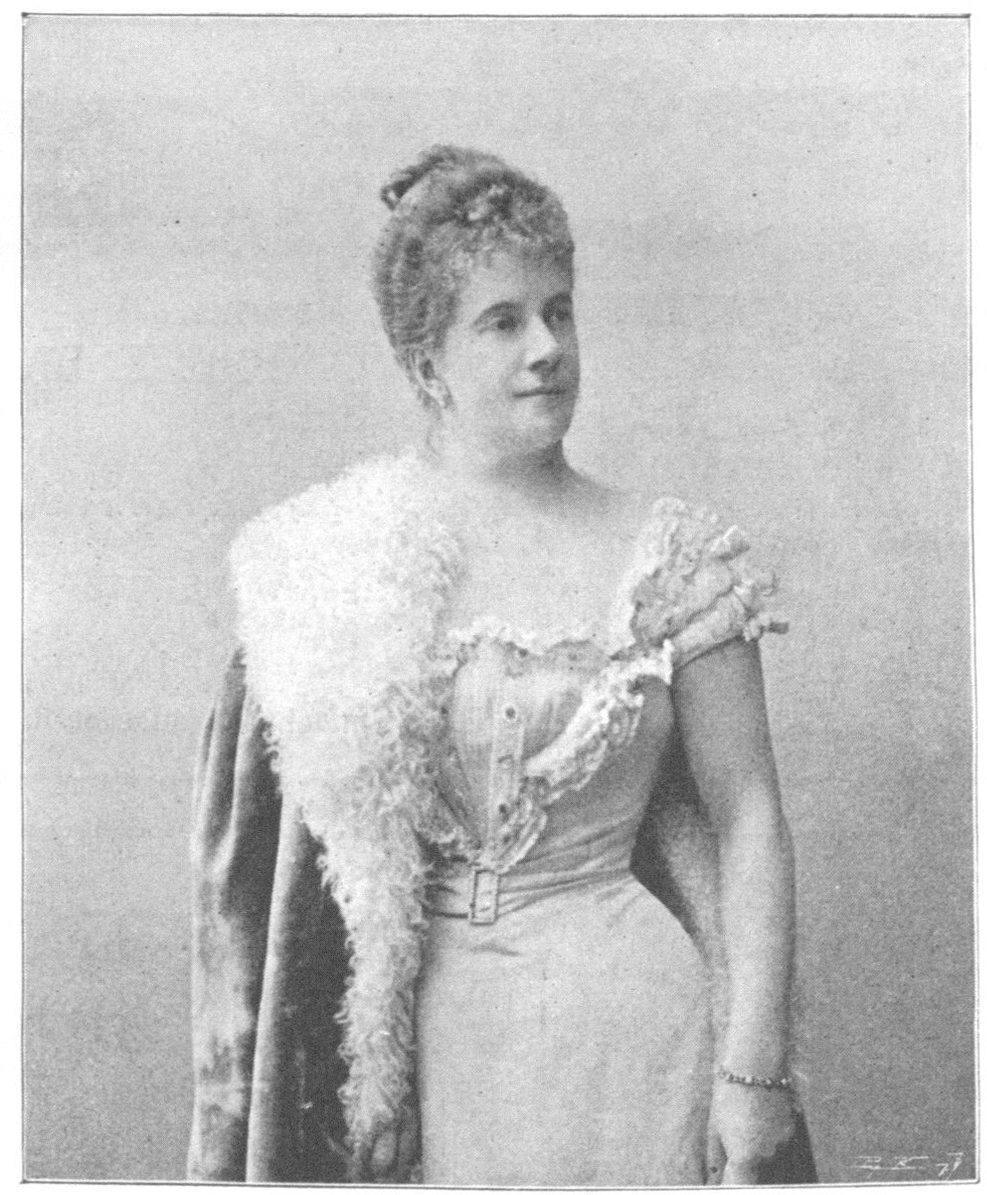
Pauline de Ahna Strauss, c. 1900

In May 1889, Strauss left his post with the Bavarian State Opera after being appointed Kapellmeister to Charles Alexander, Grand Duke of Saxe-Weimar-Eisenach in Weimar, beginning in the autumn of 1889. During the summer of 1889 he served as the assistant conductor of the Bayreuth Festival during which time he befriended Cosima Wagner who became a longterm close friend. Pauline De Ahna went with Strauss to Weimar and he later married her on 10 September 1894. She was famous for being irascible, garrulous, eccentric and outspoken, but to all appearances the marriage was essentially happy, and she was a great source of inspiration to him. Throughout his life, from his earliest songs to the final Four Last Songs of 1948, he preferred the soprano voice to all others, and all his operas contain important soprano roles. In Weimar she created the role of Freihild in Strauss's first opera, Guntram, in 1894. The opera was received with mixed reviews in Weimar, but its later production in Munich was met with scorn and was Strauss's first major failure.

In spite of the failure of his first opera, Strauss's tenure in Weimar brought about several important successes for his career. His tone poem Don Juan premiered in Weimar on 11 November 1889 to tremendous critical response, and the work quickly brought him international fame and success. This was followed by another lauded achievement, the premiere of his tone poem Death and Transfiguration in 1890. Both of these works, along with the earlier Burleske, became internationally known and established him as a leading modernist composer. He also had much success as a conductor in Weimar, particularly with the symphonic poems of Liszt and an uncut production of Tristan und Isolde in 1892.

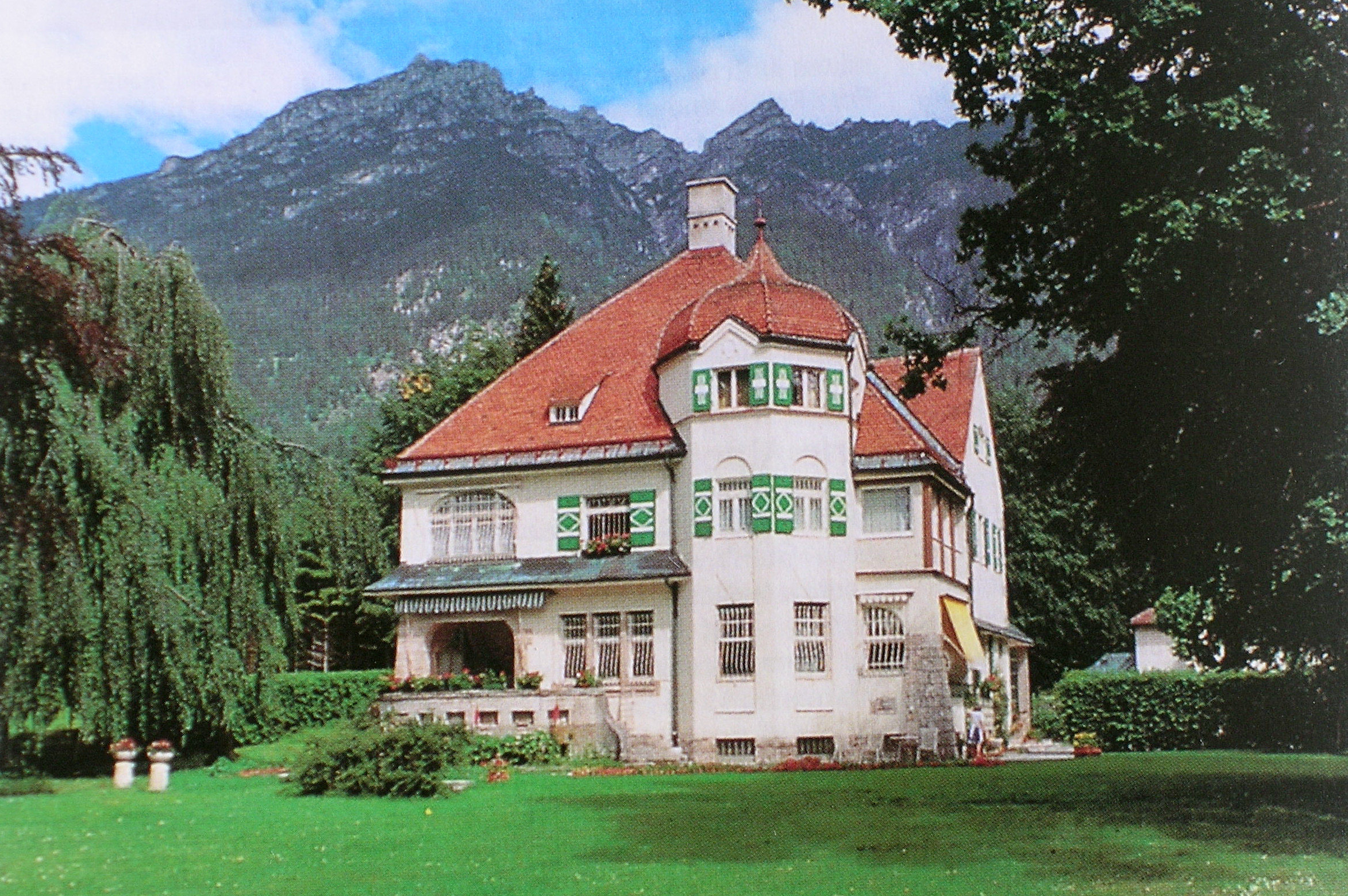
Strauss villa at Garmisch-Partenkirchen

In the summer of 1894 Strauss made his conducting debut at the Bayreuth Festival, conducting Wagner's Tannhäuser with Pauline singing Elisabeth. Just prior to their marriage the following September, Strauss left his post in Weimar when he was appointed Kapellmeister, or first conductor, of the Bavarian State Opera where he became responsible for the operas of Wagner.

While working in Munich for the next four years he had his largest creative period of tone poem composition, producing Till Eulenspiegel's Merry Pranks (1895), Also sprach Zarathustra (1896), Don Quixote (1897), and Ein Heldenleben (1898). He also served as principal conductor of the Berlin Philharmonic in 1894–1895. In 1897, the Strausses' only child, their son Franz, was born. In 1906, Strauss purchased a block of land at Garmisch-Partenkirchen and had a villa (Strauss-Villa) built there with the down payments from the publisher Adolph Fürstner for his opera Salome, residing there until his death.

== Fame and success with operas (1898–1933) ==
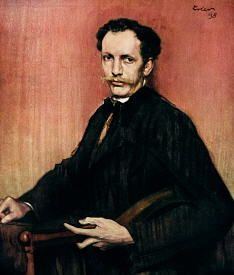
Strauss, portrait by Fritz Erler, 1898

Strauss left the Bavarian State Opera in 1898 when he became principal conductor of the Staatskapelle Berlin at the Berlin State Opera in the fall of 1898; a position he remained in for 15 years. By this time in his career, he was in constant demand as a guest conductor internationally and enjoyed celebrity status as a conductor; particularly in the works of Wagner, Mozart, and Liszt in addition to his own compositions. He became president of the Allgemeiner Deutscher Musikverein in 1901, and that same year became leader of the Berliner Tonkünstlerverein. He also served as editor of the book series Die Musik. He used all of these posts to champion contemporary German composers like Mahler. His own compositions were becoming increasingly popular, and the first major orchestra to perform an entire concert of only his music was the Vienna Philharmonic in 1901. In 1903 Strauss Festivals dedicated to his music were established in London and Heidelberg. At the latter festival his cantata Taillefer was given its world premiere.

In 1904 Strauss embarked on his first North American tour, with stops in Boston, Chicago, Cleveland, Cincinnati, New York City, and Pittsburgh. At Carnegie Hall he conducted the world premiere of his Symphonia Domestica on 21 March 1904 with the Wetzler Symphony Orchestra. He also conducted several other works in collaboration with composer Hermann Hans Wetzler and his orchestra that year at Carnegie Hall, and also performed a concert of lieder with his wife. During this trip he was working intensively on composing his third opera, Salome, based on Oscar Wilde's 1891 play Salomé. The work, which premiered in Dresden in 1905, became Strauss's greatest triumph in his career up to that point, and opera houses all over the world quickly began programing the opera.

Strauss with his wife and son, 1910

After Salome, Strauss had a string of critically successful operas which he created with the librettist and poet Hugo von Hofmannsthal. These operas included Elektra (1909), Der Rosenkavalier (1911), Ariadne auf Naxos (1912, rev. 1916), Die Frau ohne Schatten (1919), Die ägyptische Helena (1928), and Arabella (1933). While all of these works remain part of the opera repertoire, his opera Der Rosenkavalier is generally considered his finest achievement. During this time he continued to work internationally as a celebrity conductor, and from 1919 to 1924 he was principal conductor of the Vienna State Opera.

In 1920, he co-founded the Salzburg Festival with Max Reinhardt and the set designer Alfred Rolle. In 1924 Strauss's opera Intermezzo premiered at the Dresden Semperoper with both the music and libretto by Strauss. For this opera, Strauss wanted to move away from post-Wagnerian metaphysics which had been the philosophical framework of Hofmannsthal's libretti, and instead embrace a modern domestic comedy to Hofmannsthal's chagrin. The work proved to be a success.

At the outbreak of World War I Strauss was invited to sign the Manifesto of German artists and intellectuals supporting the German role in the conflict. Several colleagues, including Max Reinhardt, signed, but Strauss refused, and his response was recorded with approval by the French critic Romain Rolland in his diary for October 1914: "Declarations about war and politics are not fitting for an artist, who must give his attention to his creations and his works."

In 1924 Strauss's son Franz married Alice von Grab-Hermannswörth, daughter of a Jewish industrialist, in a Roman Catholic ceremony. Franz and Alice had two sons, Richard and Christian.

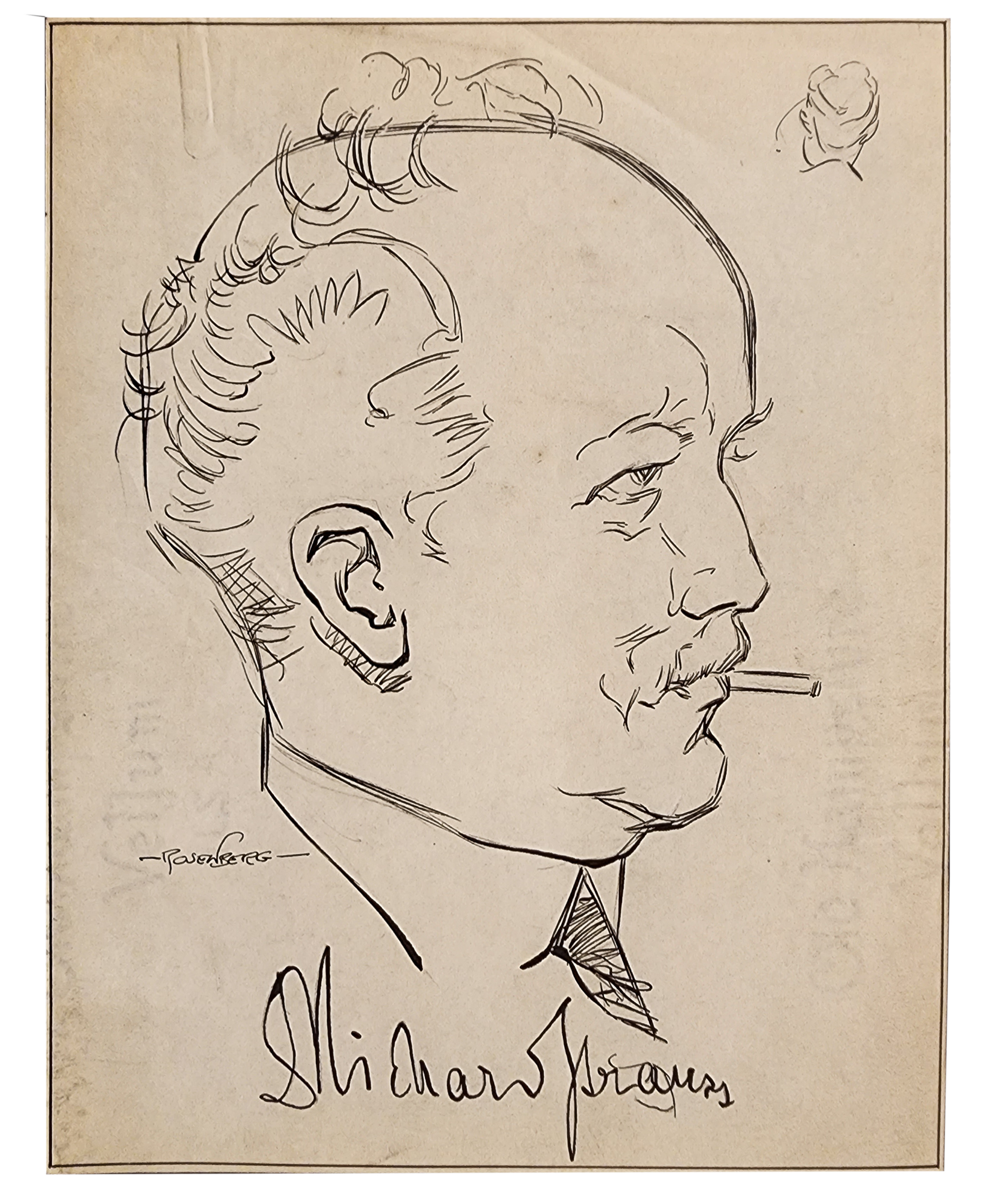
A signed drawing of Strauss by Manuel Rosenberg 1927

== Nazi Germany (1933–1945) ==
=== Reichsmusikkammer ===
In March 1933, when Strauss was 68, Adolf Hitler rose to power. Strauss never joined the Nazi Party, and studiously avoided Nazi forms of greeting. For reasons of expediency, however, he was initially drawn into cooperating with the early Nazi regime in the hope that Hitler—an ardent Wagnerian and music lover who had admired Strauss's work since viewing Salome in 1907—would promote German art and culture. Strauss's need to protect his Jewish daughter-in-law and Jewish grandchildren also motivated his behavior, in addition to his determination to preserve and conduct the music of banned composers such as Gustav Mahler and Claude Debussy.

In 1933, Strauss wrote in his private notebook:

I consider the Streicher–Goebbels Jew-baiting as a disgrace to German honour, as evidence of incompetence—the basest weapon of untalented, lazy mediocrity against a higher intelligence and greater talent.

Meanwhile, far from being an admirer of Strauss's work, Joseph Goebbels maintained expedient cordiality with Strauss only for a period. Goebbels wrote in his diary:

Unfortunately we still need him, but one day we shall have our own music and then we shall have no further need of this decadent neurotic.

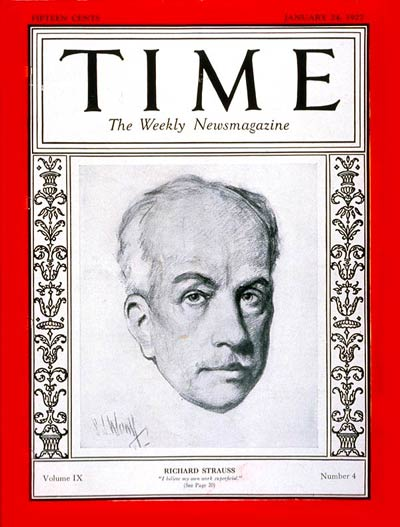
Strauss on the cover of Time in 1927; he was also on the magazine's cover in 1938.

Nevertheless, because of Strauss's international eminence, in November 1933 he was appointed to the post of president of the newly founded Reichsmusikkammer, the Reich Music Chamber. Strauss, who had lived through numerous political regimes and had no interest in politics, decided to accept the position but to remain apolitical, a decision which would eventually become untenable. He wrote to his family, "I made music under the Kaiser, and under Ebert. I'll survive under this one as well." In 1935 he wrote in his private journal:

In November 1933, the minister Goebbels nominated me president of the Reichsmusikkammer without obtaining my prior agreement. I was not consulted. I accepted this honorary office because I hoped that I would be able to do some good and prevent worse misfortunes, if from now onwards German musical life were going to be, as it was said, "reorganized" by amateurs and ignorant place-seekers.

Strauss privately scorned Goebbels and called him "a pipsqueak". However, in 1933 he dedicated an orchestral song, "Das Bächlein" ("The Little Brook"), to Goebbels, to gain his cooperation in extending German music copyright laws from 30 years to 50 years. Also in 1933, he replaced Arturo Toscanini as director of the Bayreuth Festival after Toscanini had resigned in protest against the Nazi regime. That year, he also replaced Jewish conductor Bruno Walter after Walter was forced by Goebbels to withdraw from a concert at the Berlin Philharmonic.

Strauss attempted to ignore Nazi bans on performances of works by Debussy, Mahler, and Mendelssohn. He also continued to work on a comic opera, Die schweigsame Frau, with his Jewish friend and librettist Stefan Zweig. When the opera was premiered in Dresden in 1935, Strauss insisted that Zweig's name appear on the theatrical billing, much to the ire of the Nazi regime. Hitler and Goebbels avoided attending the opera, and it was halted after three performances and subsequently banned by the Third Reich.

On 17 June 1935, Strauss wrote a letter to Stefan Zweig, in which he stated:

Do you believe I am ever, in any of my actions, guided by the thought that I am 'German'? Do you suppose Mozart was consciously 'Aryan' when he composed? I recognise only two types of people: those who have talent and those who have none.

This letter to Zweig was intercepted by the Gestapo and sent to Hitler. Strauss was subsequently dismissed from his post as Reichsmusikkammer president in 1935. The 1936 Berlin Summer Olympics nevertheless used Strauss's Olympische Hymne, which he had composed in 1934. In 1940, Strauss was chosen by Goebbels to compose the Japanese Festival Music to celebrate the 2600th anniversary of the founding of the Japanese Empire.

Strauss's seeming relationship with the Nazis in the 1930s attracted criticism from some noted musicians, including Toscanini, who in 1933 had said, "To Strauss the composer I take off my hat; to Strauss the man I put it back on again", when Strauss had accepted the presidency of the Reichsmusikkammer. Much of Strauss's motivation in his conduct during the Third Reich was, however, to protect his Jewish daughter-in-law Alice and his Jewish grandchildren from persecution. Both of his grandsons were bullied at school, but Strauss used his considerable influence to prevent the boys or their mother being sent to concentration camps.

=== Late operas and family tragedy ===
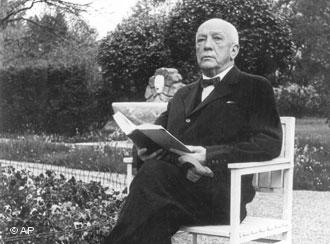
Strauss at Garmisch in 1938

Frustrated that he could no longer work with Zweig as his librettist, Strauss turned to Joseph Gregor, a Viennese theatre historian, at Gregor's request. The first opera they worked on together was Daphne, but it ultimately became the second of their operas to be premiered. Their first work to be staged was in 1938, when the entire nation was preparing for war, they presented Friedenstag (Peace Day), a one-act opera set in a besieged fortress during the Thirty Years' War. The work is essentially a hymn to peace and a thinly veiled criticism of the Third Reich. With its contrasts between freedom and enslavement, war and peace, light and dark, this work has a close affinity with Beethoven's Fidelio. Productions of the opera ceased shortly after the outbreak of war in 1939. The two men collaborated on two more operas which proved to be Strauss's last: Die Liebe der Danae (1940) and Capriccio (1942).

When his Jewish daughter-in-law Alice was placed under house arrest in Garmisch-Partenkirchen in 1938, Strauss used his connections in Berlin, including opera-house General Intendant Heinz Tietjen, to secure her safety. He drove to the Theresienstadt concentration camp to argue, albeit unsuccessfully, for the release of Alice's grandmother, Paula Neumann. In the end, Neumann and 25 other relatives were murdered in the camps. While Alice's mother, Marie von Grab, was safe in Lucerne, Switzerland, Strauss also wrote several letters to the SS pleading for the release of her children who were also held in camps; his letters were ignored.

In 1942, Strauss moved with his family back to Vienna, where Alice and her children could be protected by Baldur von Schirach, the Gauleiter of Vienna. However, Strauss was unable to protect his Jewish relatives completely; in early 1944, while Strauss was away, Alice and her son Franz were abducted by the Gestapo and imprisoned for two nights. Strauss's personal intervention at this point saved them, and he was able to take them back to Garmisch, where the two remained under house arrest until the end of the war.

=== Metamorphosen and end of the war ===
Strauss completed the composition of Metamorphosen, a work for 23 solo strings, in 1945. The title and inspiration for the work comes from a profoundly self-examining poem by Goethe, which Strauss had considered setting as a choral work. Generally regarded as one of the masterpieces of the string repertoire, Metamorphosen contains Strauss's most sustained outpouring of tragic emotion. Conceived and written during the blackest days of World War II, the piece expresses Strauss's mourning of, among other things, the destruction of German culture—including the bombing of every great opera house in the nation. At the end of the war, Strauss wrote in his private diary:

The most terrible period of human history is at an end, the twelve year reign of bestiality, ignorance and anti-culture under the greatest criminals, during which Germany's 2000 years of cultural evolution met its doom.

In April 1945, American soldiers occupying Germany at the end of the war arrived at Strauss's Garmisch estate. As Strauss descended the staircase, he announced to Lieutenant Milton Weiss of the U.S. Army, "I am Richard Strauss, the composer of Rosenkavalier and Salome." Lt. Weiss, who was also a musician, nodded in recognition. An "Off Limits" sign was subsequently placed on the lawn to protect Strauss. The American oboist John de Lancie, who knew Strauss's orchestral writing for oboe thoroughly, was in the army unit, and asked Strauss to compose an oboe concerto. Initially dismissive of the idea, Strauss completed this late work, his Oboe Concerto, before the end of the year.

== "Indian Summer", final years and death (1942–1949) ==
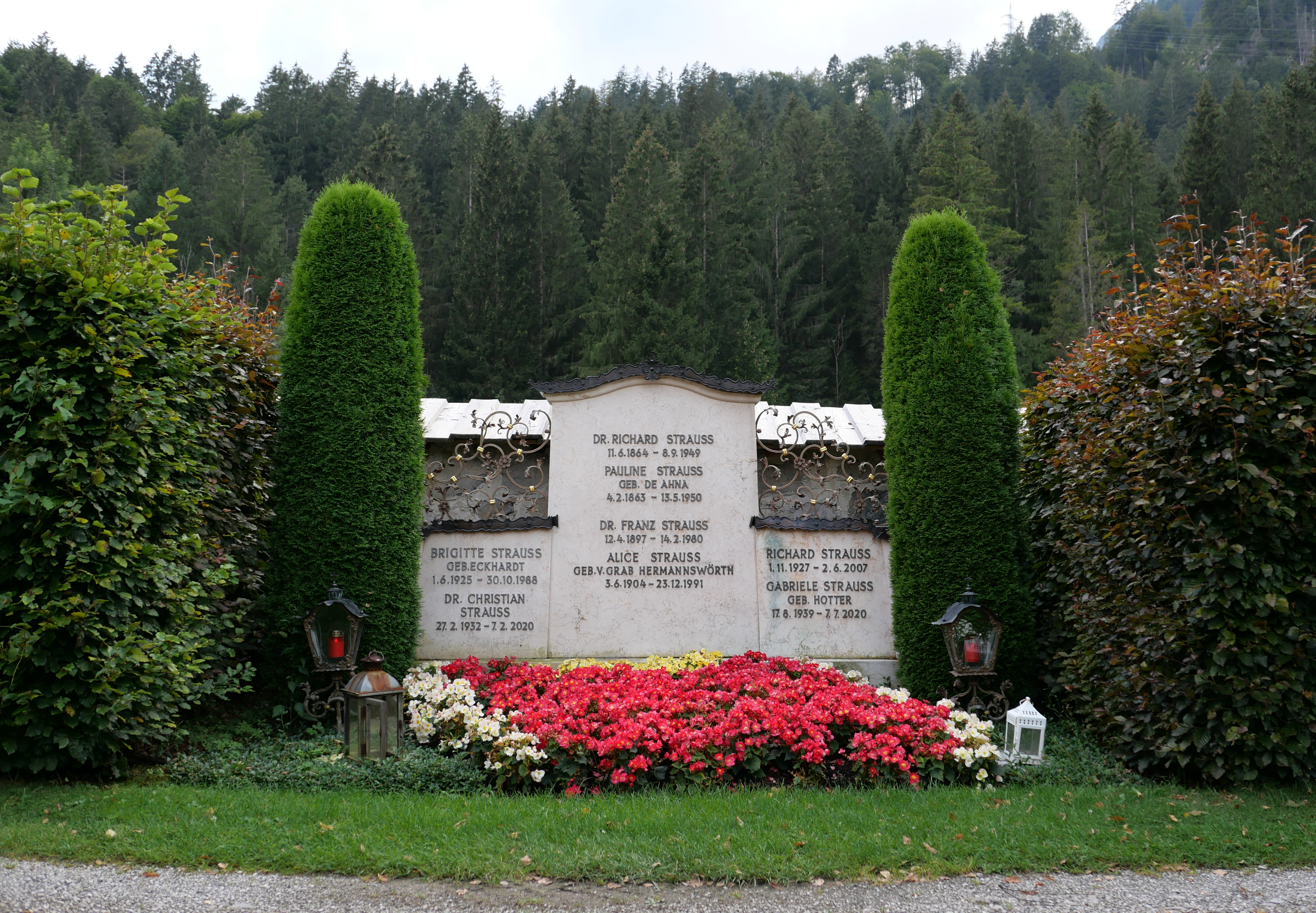
Strauss' grave at Garmisch-Partenkirchen cemetery in 2024

The metaphor "Indian summer" has been used by journalists, biographers, and music critics, notably Norman Del Mar in 1964, to describe Strauss's late creative upsurge from 1942 to the end of his life. The events of World War II seemed to bring the composer – who had grown old, tired, and a little jaded – into focus. The major works of the last years of Strauss's life, written in his late 70s and 80s, include, among others, his Horn Concerto No. 2, Metamorphosen, his Oboe Concerto, his Duet concertino for clarinet and bassoon, and his Four Last Songs.

In June 1945, after finishing Metamorphosen, Strauss completed his Sonatina No. 2 in E-flat major ("Fröhliche Werkstatt") for 16 wind instruments, which he had begun in early 1944; at the end of the score he wrote "To the Manes of the divine Mozart at the end of a life full of thankfulness".

Like those of most Germans, Strauss's bank accounts were frozen, and many of his assets seized by American forces. Now elderly and with very few resources left, Strauss and his wife left Germany for Switzerland in October 1945 where they settled in a hotel outside Zurich, and later at the Montreux Palace hotel in Montreux. There they met the Swiss music critic Willy Schuh, who became Strauss's biographer. Short of money, in 1947 Strauss embarked on his last international tour, a three-week trip to London, in which he conducted several of his tone poems and excerpts of his operas, and was present during a complete staging of Elektra by the BBC. The trip was a critical success and provided him and his wife with some much-needed money.

From May to September 1948, just before his death, Strauss composed the Four Last Songs, which deal with the subject of dying. The last one, "Im Abendrot" (At Sunset), ends with the line "Is this perhaps death?" The question is not answered in words, but instead Strauss quotes the "transfiguration theme" from his earlier tone poem Death and Transfiguration—meant to symbolize the transfiguration and fulfilment of the soul after death. In June 1948, he was cleared of any wrong-doing by a denazification tribunal in Munich. That same month he orchestrated Ruhe, meine Seele!, a song that he had originally composed in 1894.

In December 1948, Strauss was hospitalized for several weeks after undergoing bladder surgery. His health rapidly deteriorated after that, and he conducted his last performance, the end of Act 2 of Der Rosenkavalier at the Prinzregententheater in Munich, during celebrations of his 85th birthday on 10 June 1949. On 15 August, he suffered a heart attack and he quietly died of kidney failure in his sleep shortly after 2 PM on 8 September 1949, in Garmisch-Partenkirchen, West Germany. From his death-bed, he remarked to his daughter-in-law Alice, "dying is just as I composed it in Tod und Verklärung".

Georg Solti, who had arranged Strauss's 85th birthday celebration, also directed the orchestra during Strauss's funeral at the Munich Ostfriedhof crematorium. The conductor later described how, during the singing of the famous trio from Rosenkavalier, "each singer broke down in tears and dropped out of the ensemble, but they recovered themselves and we all ended together". Strauss's wife, Pauline de Ahna, died eight months later on 13 May 1950, at the age of 88.

Strauss himself declared in 1947 with characteristic self-deprecation: "I may not be a first-rate composer, but I am a first-class second-rate composer." The Canadian pianist Glenn Gould described Strauss in 1962 as "the greatest musical figure who has lived in this century".

== Music ==
Strauss in Amsterdam (short film 1924)

=== Solo and chamber works ===
Some of Strauss's first compositions were solo instrumental and chamber works. These pieces include early compositions for piano solo in a conservative harmonic style, many of which are lost: two piano trios (1877 and 1878), a string quartet (1881), a piano sonata (1882), a cello sonata (1883), a piano quartet (1885), a violin sonata (1888), as well as a serenade (1882) and a longer suite (1884), both scored for double wind quintet plus two additional horns and contrabassoon.

After 1890, Strauss composed very infrequently for chamber groups, his energies being almost completely absorbed with large-scale orchestral works and operas. Four of his chamber pieces are actually arrangements of portions of his operas, including the Daphne-Etude for solo violin and the String Sextet, which is the overture to his final opera Capriccio. His last independent chamber work, an Allegretto in E major for violin and piano, dates from 1948.

He also composed two large-scale works for wind ensemble during this period: Sonatina No. 1 "From an Invalid's Workshop" (1943) and Sonatina No. 2 "Happy Workshop" (1946)—both scored for double wind quintet plus two additional horns, a third clarinet in C, bassett horn, bass clarinet, and contrabassoon.

=== Tone poems and other orchestral works ===
Excerpt from Don Juan (1:48)
Performed by Dmitri Kitayenko with the Frankfurt Radio Symphony

Strauss wrote two early symphonies: Symphony No. 1 (1880) and Symphony No. 2 (1884). However, Strauss's style began to truly develop and change when, in 1885, he met Alexander Ritter, a noted composer and violinist, and the husband of one of Richard Wagner's nieces. It was Ritter who persuaded Strauss to abandon the conservative style of his youth and begin writing tone poems. He also introduced Strauss to the essays of Wagner and the writings of Arthur Schopenhauer. Strauss went on to conduct one of Ritter's operas, and at Strauss's request Ritter later wrote a poem describing the events depicted in Strauss's tone poem Death and Transfiguration. The new influences from Ritter resulted in what is widely regarded as Strauss's first piece to show his mature personality, the tone poem Don Juan (1888), which displays a new kind of virtuosity in its bravura orchestral manner. Strauss went on to write a series of increasingly ambitious tone poems: Death and Transfiguration (1889), Till Eulenspiegel's Merry Pranks (1895), Also sprach Zarathustra (1896), Don Quixote (1897), Ein Heldenleben (1898), Symphonia Domestica (1903) and An Alpine Symphony (1911–1915). One commentator has observed of these works that "no orchestra could exist without his tone poems, written to celebrate the glories of the post-Wagnerian symphony orchestra."

James Hepokoski notes a shift in Strauss's technique in the tone poems, occurring between 1892 and 1893. It was after this point that Strauss rejected the philosophy of Schopenhauer and began more forcefully critiquing the institution of the symphony and the symphonic poem, thereby differentiating the second cycle of tone poems from the first.

=== Concertos ===
Burleske
Performed by Neal O'Doan with the Seattle Philharmonic Orchestra

Strauss's output of works for solo instrument or instruments with orchestra was fairly extensive. The most famous include two concertos for horn, which are still part of the standard repertoire of most horn soloists—Horn Concerto No. 1 (1883) and Horn Concerto No. 2 (1942); the Romanze for cello and orchestra (1883); a Violin Concerto in D minor (1882); the Burleske for piano and orchestra (1885, revised 1889); the tone poem Don Quixote for cello, viola and orchestra (1897); the well-known late Oboe Concerto in D major (1945); and the Duet concertino for clarinet and bassoon with string orchestra, which was one of his last works (1948).

=== Opera ===
Around the end of the 19th century, Strauss turned his attention to opera. His first two attempts in the genre, Guntram (1894) and Feuersnot (1901), were controversial works; Guntram was the first significant critical failure of Strauss's career, and Feuersnot was considered obscene by some critics.

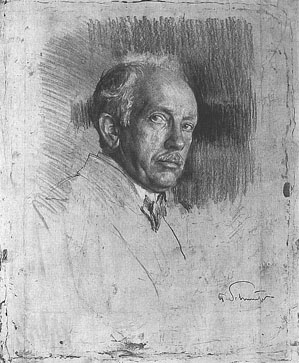
Richard Strauss engraved by Ferdinand Schmutzer (1922)

In 1905, Strauss produced Salome, a somewhat dissonant modernist opera based on the play by Oscar Wilde, which produced a passionate reaction from audiences. The premiere was a major success, with the artists taking more than 38 curtain calls. Many later performances of the opera were also successful, not only with the general public but also with Strauss's peers: Maurice Ravel said that Salome was "stupendous"; Gustav Mahler described it as "a live volcano, a subterranean fire". Strauss reputedly financed his house in Garmisch-Partenkirchen completely from the revenues generated by the opera. As with the later Elektra, Salome features an extremely taxing lead soprano role. Strauss often remarked that he preferred writing for the female voice, which is apparent in these two sister operas—the male parts are almost entirely smaller roles, included only to supplement the soprano's performance.

Strauss's next opera was Elektra (1909), which took his use of dissonance even further, in particular with the Elektra chord. Elektra was also the first opera in which Strauss collaborated with the poet Hugo von Hofmannsthal as his librettist. The two subsequently worked together on numerous occasions. For his later works with Hofmannsthal, Strauss moderated his harmonic language: he used a more lush, melodic late-Romantic style based on Wagnerian chromatic harmonies that he had used in his tone poems, with much less dissonance, and exhibiting immense virtuosity in orchestral writing and tone color. This resulted in operas such as Der Rosenkavalier (1911) having great public success. Strauss continued to produce operas at regular intervals until 1942. With Hofmannsthal he created Ariadne auf Naxos (1912), Die Frau ohne Schatten (1919), Die ägyptische Helena (1928), and Arabella (1933). For Intermezzo (1924) Strauss provided his own libretto. Die schweigsame Frau (1935) was composed with Stefan Zweig as librettist; Friedenstag (1935–36) and Daphne (1937) both had a libretto by Joseph Gregor and Stefan Zweig; and Die Liebe der Danae (1940) was with Joseph Gregor. Strauss's final opera, Capriccio (1942), had a libretto by Clemens Krauss, although the genesis for it came from Stefan Zweig and Joseph Gregor.

=== Lieder ===
Strauss was a prolific composer of lieder. He often composed them with the voice of his wife in mind. His lieder were written for voice and piano, and he orchestrated several of them after the fact. In 1894–1895, around the age of 30, he published several well-known songs including "Ruhe, meine Seele!", "Cäcilie", "Morgen!", "Heimliche Aufforderung", and "Traum durch die Dämmerung". In 1918, after a long hiatus devoted to opera, he wrote Sechs Lieder, Op. 68, also called Brentano Lieder. He completed his works in the genre in 1948 with Four Last Songs for soprano and orchestra. He reportedly composed these with Kirsten Flagstad in mind and she gave the first performance, which was recorded. Strauss's songs have always been popular with audiences and performers, and are generally considered by musicologists—along with many of his other compositions—to be masterpieces.

== Legacy ==
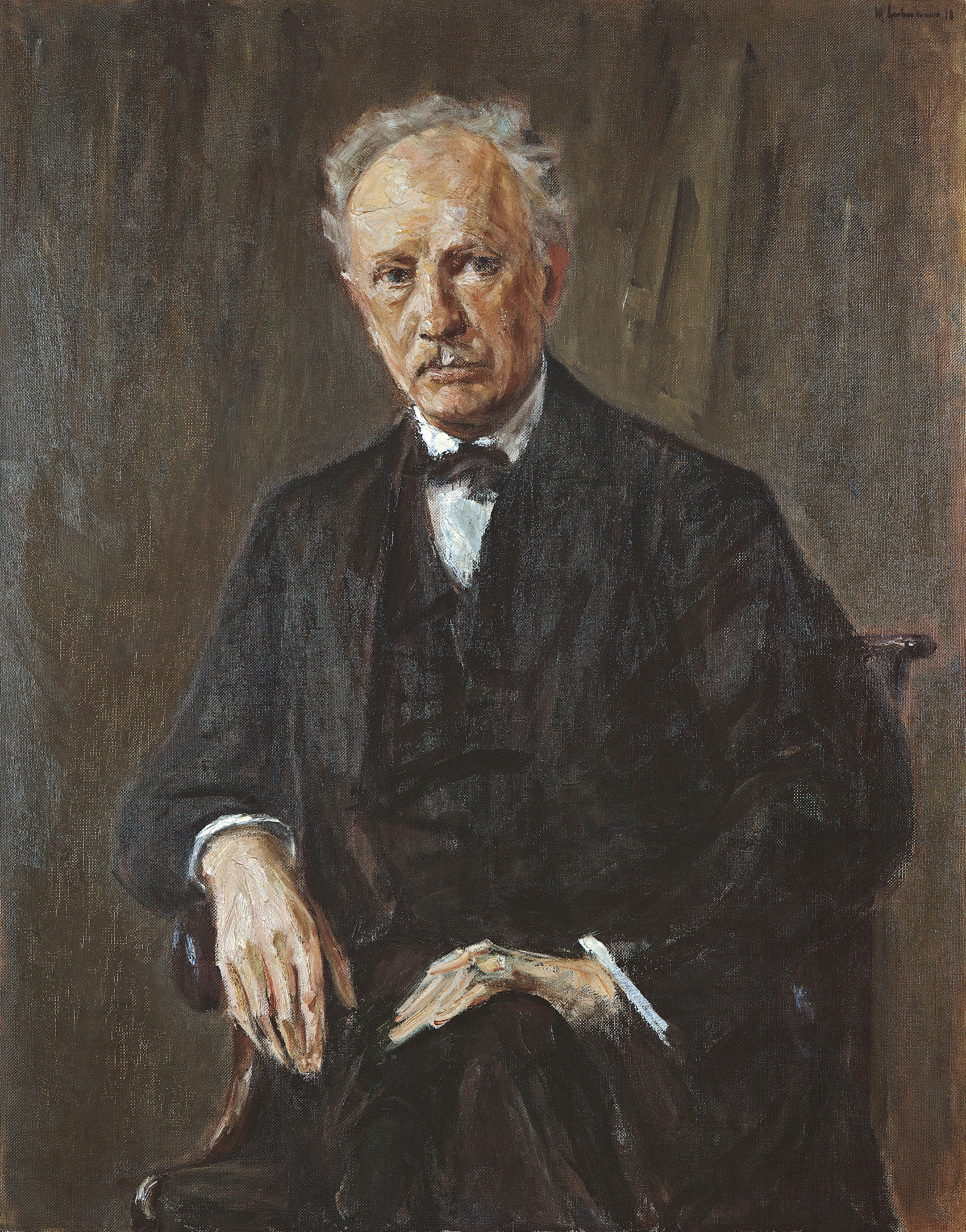
Richard Strauss in 1918

TIME magazine suggested in 1927 that he wrote music to test how much "cacophony, dissonance, exaggeration, and clowning" his audiences would applaud. Early in Strauss's career, eminent musicologist Hugo Riemann reflected "His last works only too clearly reveal his determination to make a sensation at all costs".

Until the 1980s, Strauss was regarded by some post-modern musicologists as a conservative, backward-looking composer, but re-examination of and new research on the composer has re-evaluated his place as that of a modernist, albeit one who still utilized and sometimes revered tonality and lush orchestration. Strauss is noted for his pioneering subtleties of orchestration, combined with an advanced harmonic style; when he first played Strauss at a university production of Ariadne auf Naxos, the conductor Mark Elder "was flabbergasted. I had no idea music could do the things he was doing with harmony and melody."

Strauss's music had a considerable influence on composers at the start of the 20th century. Béla Bartók heard Also sprach Zarathustra in 1902, and later said that the work "contained the seeds for a new life"; a Straussian influence is clearly present in his works of that period, including his First String Quartet, Kossuth, and Bluebeard's Castle. Similarly, Strauss had a huge impact on Arnold Schönberg and Anton Webern. Karol Szymanowski was also greatly influenced by Strauss, reflected in such pieces as his Concert Overture and his first and second symphonies, and his opera Hagith which was modeled after Salome. English composers were also influenced by Strauss, from Edward Elgar in his concert overture In the South (Alassio) and other works to Benjamin Britten in his opera writing. Many contemporary composers recognise a debt to Strauss, including John Adams and John Corigliano.

Strauss's musical style played a major role in the development of film music in the middle of the 20th century. The style of his musical depictions of character (Don Juan, Till Eulenspiegel, the Hero) and emotions found their way into the lexicon of film music. Film music historian Timothy Schuerer wrote, "The elements of post (late) romantic music that had greatest impact on scoring are its lush sound, expanded harmonic language, chromaticism, use of program music and use of Leitmotifs. Hollywood composers found the post-romantic idiom compatible with their efforts in scoring film". Max Steiner and Erich Korngold came from the same musical world as Strauss and were quite naturally drawn to write in his style. As film historian Roy Prendergast wrote, "When confronted with the kind of dramatic problem films presented to them, Steiner, Korngold and Newman ... looked to Wagner, Puccini, Verdi and Strauss for the answers to dramatic film scoring." Later, the opening to Also sprach Zarathustra became one of the best-known pieces of film music when Stanley Kubrick used it in his 1968 movie 2001: A Space Odyssey. The film music of John Williams has continued the Strauss influence, in scores for mainstream hits such as Superman and Star Wars.

Strauss has always been popular with audiences in the concert hall and continues to be so. He has consistently been in the top 10 composers most performed by symphony orchestras in the US and Canada over the period 2002–2010. He is also in the top 5 of 20th-century composers (born after 1860) in terms of the number of currently available recordings of his works.

=== Recordings as a conductor ===
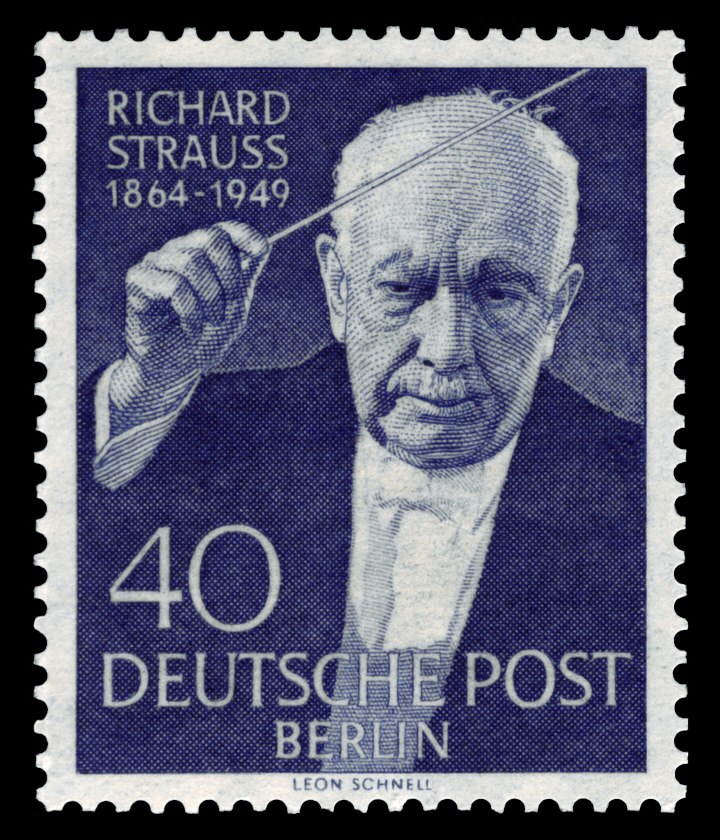
Stamp issued in 1954

Strauss, as conductor, made a large number of recordings, both of his own music as well as music by German and Austrian composers. His 1929 performances of Till Eulenspiegel's Merry Pranks and Don Juan with the Berlin State Opera Orchestra have long been considered the best of his early electrical recordings. In the first complete performance of his An Alpine Symphony, made in 1941 and later released by EMI, Strauss used the full complement of percussion instruments required in this work.

Koch Legacy has also released Strauss's recordings of overtures by Gluck, Carl Maria von Weber, Peter Cornelius, and Wagner. The preference for German and Austrian composers in Germany in the 1920s through the 1940s was typical of the German nationalism that existed after World War I. Strauss clearly capitalized on national pride for the great German-speaking composers.

There were many other recordings, including some taken from radio broadcasts and concerts during the 1930s and early 1940s. The sheer volume of recorded performances would undoubtedly yield some definitive performances from a very capable and rather forward-looking conductor.

In 1944, Strauss celebrated his 80th birthday and conducted the Vienna Philharmonic in recordings of his own major orchestral works, as well as his seldom-heard Schlagobers (Whipped Cream) ballet music. Some find more feeling in these performances than in Strauss's earlier recordings, which were recorded on the Magnetophon tape recording equipment. Vanguard Records later issued the recordings on LPs. Some of these recordings have been reissued on CD by Preiser. The last recording made by Strauss was on 19 October 1947 live at the Royal Albert Hall in London, where he conducted the Philharmonia Orchestra in his Burleske for piano and orchestra (Alfred Blumen piano), Don Juan and Sinfonia Domestica.

Strauss also made live-recording player piano music rolls for the Hupfeld system and in 1906 ten recordings for the reproducing piano Welte-Mignon all of which survive today. Strauss was also the composer of the music on the first CD to be commercially released: Deutsche Grammophon's 1983 release of their 1980 recording of Herbert von Karajan conducting the Alpine Symphony.

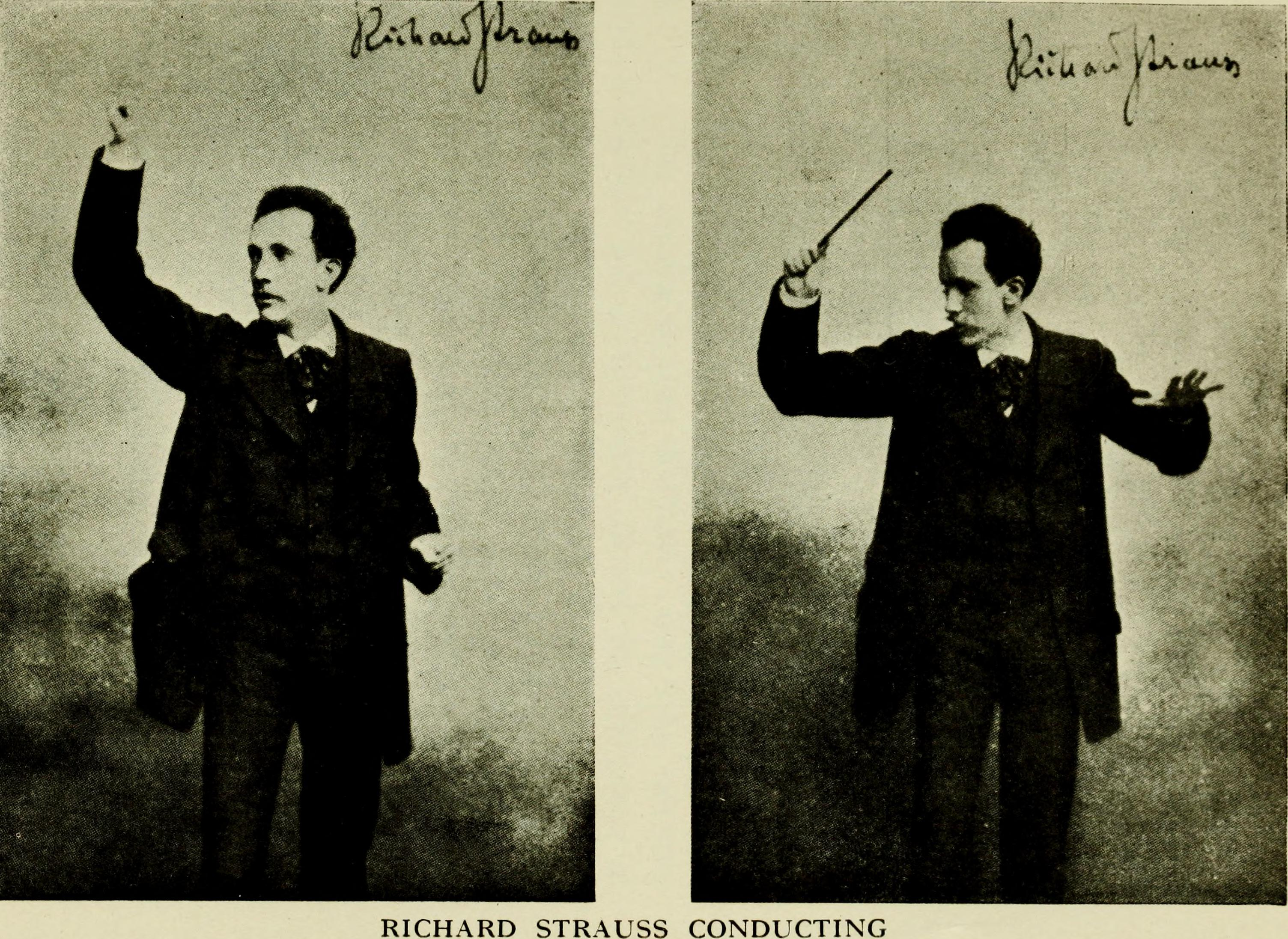
Strauss conducting (c. 1900)

Pierre Boulez said that Strauss the conductor was "a complete master of his trade". Music critic Harold C. Schonberg writes that, while Strauss was a very fine conductor, he often put scant effort into his recordings. Schonberg focused primarily on Strauss's recordings of Mozart's Symphony No. 40 and Beethoven's Symphony No. 7, as well as noting that Strauss played a breakneck version of Beethoven's 9th Symphony in about 45 minutes. Concerning Beethoven's 7th Symphony, Schonberg wrote, "There is almost never a ritard or a change in expression or nuance. The slow movement is almost as fast as the following vivace; and the last movement, with a big cut in it, is finished in 4 minutes, 25 seconds. (It should run between 7 and 8 minutes.)" He also complained that the Mozart symphony had "no force, no charm, no inflection, with a metronomic rigidity".

Peter Gutmann's 1994 review for ClassicalNotes.com says the performances of the Beethoven 5th and 7th symphonies, as well as Mozart's last three symphonies, are actually quite good, even if they are sometimes unconventional. Gutmann wrote:

It is true, as the critics suggest, that the readings forego overt emotion, but what emerges instead is a solid sense of structure, letting the music speak convincingly for itself. It is also true that Strauss's tempos are generally swift, but this, too, contributes to the structural cohesion and in any event is fully in keeping with our modern outlook in which speed is a virtue and attention spans are defined more by MTV clips and news sound bites than by evenings at the opera and thousand page novels.

== Honors ==
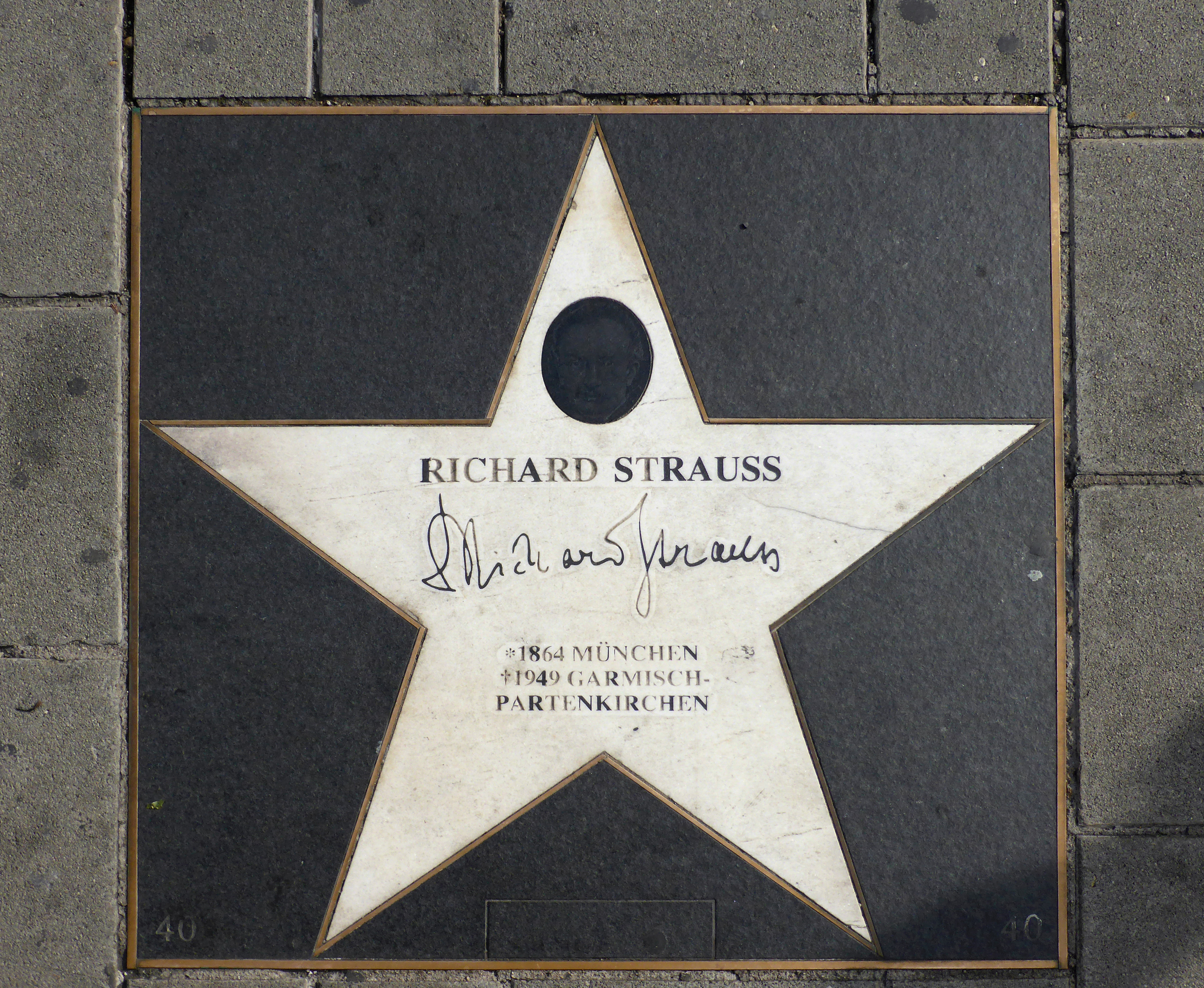
Star on the Walk of Fame, Vienna

His honors included:

- 1903: Honorary Doctorate, Heidelberg University.
- 1907: Ordre national de la Légion d'honneur, Croix de Chevalier, Paris, France. Officier, (14 June 1914).
- 1910: Bavarian Maximilian Order for Science and Art.
- 1914: Honorary Doctorate, Oxford University. Honorary citizen of Munich.
- 1924: Pour le Mérite for Sciences and Art, German award.
- 1924: Honorary Doctorate, University of Music and Performing Arts, Vienna. Freedom of the cities of Vienna and Salzburg.
- 1932: New York College of Music Medal.
- 1936: the Royal Philharmonic Society's gold medal.
- 1939: Commandeur de L'Ordre de la Couronne, presented by Leopold III of Belgium.
- 1949: Honorary Doctorate, Ludwig-Maximilians-Universität München.

== In later culture ==
- James Blish's science fiction story "A Work of Art" features the concept of Richard Strauss's essence and personality being implanted into another person.
