= List of compositions by Richard Strauss =

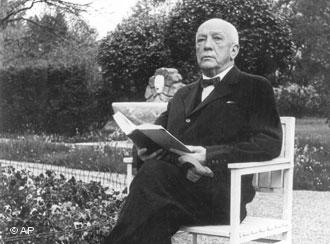
Richard Strauss in 1938

The table below shows a list of compositions by Richard Strauss.

== Catalogues ==
Only 88 compositions by the German composer Richard Strauss (1864–1949) have been assigned opus numbers; these numbers are shown in the table below in the column "Op." Two volumes of a catalogue of the remaining works were published by Erich Hermann Mueller von Asow (1892–1964) in 1959. After von Asow's death Franz Trenner (d. 1993) and Alfons Ott (d. 1976) published the third volume, based on von Asow's notes; this catalogue lists 323 titles, including Strauss's literary writings. The numbers for compositions from this catalogue are shown in the column "AV" in the table below.

During the 15 years it took to publish von Asow's work, many new sources became available, so Franz Trenner created a new chronological catalogue in 1985, a slim volume of 153 pages without incipits. A second updated edition of 400 pages for all works of Strauss was published in 1993 with incipits, and his son Florian Trenner published a completely revised edition of 496 pages in 1999; this catalogue lists 298 works and its numbers are shown in the column "TrV" below.

The year shown is the year of the first performance, unless there is a large gap between the dates of composition and premiere; in that case, the year refers to the date of composition and the date of the premiere is shown in the column "Work."

== Works ==
TrV	Op.	AV	Year	Genre	Work
1	—	1	1870	piano (or orchestra)	Schneiderpolka, for piano (or string orchestra)
2	—	2	1870	Lied	"Weihnachtslied" (Schlaf wohl, du Himmelsknabe du), for voice and piano
3	—	3	1870	Lied	"Einkehr" (Bei einem Wirte wundermild), for voice and piano
4	—	4	1871	Lied	"Winterreise" (Bei diesem kalten Wehen), for voice and piano
5	—	5	1871	Lied	"Waldkonzert" (Der Frühling gibt jetzt ein Konzert), for voice and piano
6	—	6	1871	Lied	"Der weiße Hirsch" (Es gingen drei Jäger wohl auf die Pirsch), for alto, tenor and bass voices with piano
7	—	7	1871	Lied	"Der böhmische Musikant" (Es kommt aus fernem Böhmerland), for voice and piano
8	—	8	1871	Lied	"Herz, mein Herz" (Herz, mein Herz, sei nicht beklommen), for voice and piano
9	—	9	1871	piano	Moderato in C major, for piano
10	—	193	1871	Lied	"Gute Nacht" (Schon fängt es an zu dämmern), for voice and piano
11	—	10	1872	piano	Panzenburg-Polka, for piano
12	—	11	1872	piano	Langsamer Satz in G major, for piano
13	—	151	1872	Lied	"Des Alpenhirten Abschied" (Ihr Matten lebt wohl!), for voice and piano
14	—	152	1872	piano	Polka, Walzer und andere kleinere Kompositionen, for piano
15	—	12	1873	solo horn	Two études for solo horn in E♭ and E
16	—	13	1873	Lied	"Der müde Wanderer" (Schon sank die Sonne nieder), for voice and piano
17	—	15	1873	orchestral	Overture to the Singspiel Hochlands Treue
18	—	18	1873	piano	Five Little Pieces, for piano
19	—	153	1873	piano	Sonatina in C major, for piano
20	—	154	1873	piano	Sonatina in E major, for piano
21	—	194	1873	chamber music	Two Little Pieces for violin and piano in G major
22	—	17	1874	piano	Sonatina No.1 in C major, for piano
23	—	18	1874	piano	Sonatina No.2 in F major, for piano
24	—	19	1874	piano	Sonatina No.3 in B♭ major, for piano
25	—	195	1874	piano	Sonatina No.4 in E major, for piano
26	—	155	1874	piano	Sonatina No.5 in E♭ major, for piano
27	—	156	1874	piano	Sonatina No.6 in D major, for piano
28	—	197	1874	piano	Six fragments to sonatas (AV 197–202)
29	—	21	1874	piano	Fantasie in C major, for piano
30	—	22	1875	piano	Two Little Pieces in A major and G minor, for piano
31	—	23	1875		Vierstimmiger Satz, exercise in B♭ major
32	—	24	1875	choral	Vierstimmiger Choralsatz, exercise in B♭ major
33	—	157	1875	chamber music	Concertante for 2 violins, cello and piano
34	—	203	1875	piano	Allegro assai in B♭ major, for piano
35	—	204	1875	chamber music	String Quartet in C minor
36	—	196	1876	piano	Preliminary studies on harmony and counterpoint, for piano
37	—	25	1876	choral	Two songs for mixed chorus: 1. "Morgengesang" (Im Osten geht die Sonne auf); 2. "Frühlingsnacht" (Über'm Garten durch die Lüfte)
41	—	30	1876	orchestral	Concert Overture in B minor, for orchestra
42	—	14	1876	Lied	"Husarenlied" (Husaren müssen reiten), for voice and piano
43	1	—	1881	orchestral	Festmarsch in E♭ major, for orchestra
45	—	207	1876	orchestral	Overture in E minor, for orchestra
46	—	208	1876	piano	Overture in E♭ major, for piano
47	—	38	1877	piano	Piano Sonata No.1 in E major
48	—	33	1877	Lied	"Der Fischer" (Das Wasser rauscht', das Wasser schwoll), for voice and piano
49	—	34	1877	Lied	"Die Drossel" (Ich will ja nicht in Garten geh'n), for voice and piano
50	—	35	1877	Lied	"Lass ruhn die Toten" (Es steht ein altes Gemäuer), for voice and piano
51	—	36	1877	Lied	"Lust und Qual" (Knabe sass ich Fischerknabe), for voice and piano
52	—	32	1877	orchestral	Serenade in G major, for orchestra
53	—	37	1877	chamber music	Piano Trio No.1 in A major, for violin, cello and piano
54	—	31	1877	choral	Mass in D major, four movements for mixed chorus: 1. Kyrie; 2. Sanctus; 3. Benedictus; 4. Agnus Dei
55	—	209	1877	orchestral	Andante cantabile in D major, for orchestra
56	—	210	1877	orchestral	Andante in B♭ major, for orchestra
57	—	39	1878	piano	Kontrapunkt-Studien I, imitative exercises and canons for piano
58	—	40	1878	Lied	"Spielmann und Zither" (Der Spielmann sass am Felsen), for voice and piano
59	—	41	1878	Lied	"Wiegenlied" (Die Ähren nur noch nicken), for voice and piano
60	—	42	1878	Lied	"Abend- und Morgenrot" (Die Mücke sitzt am Fenster"), for voice and piano
61	—	44-45	1878	Singspiel	Lila, Singspiel after Goethe
62	—	43	1878	Lied	"Im Walde" (Im Walde im hellen Sonnenschein), for voice and piano
63	—	46	1878	Lied	"Ein Spielmann und sein Kind", for voice and piano
64	—	29	1878	Lied	"Alphorn" (Ein Alphorn hör' ich schallen), for voice, horn and piano
65	—	47	1878	Lied	"Nebel" (Du trüber Nebel hüllst mir das Tal), for voice and piano
66	—	48	1878	Lied	"Soldatenlied" (Die Trommeln und Pfeiffen), for voice and piano
67	—	49	1878	Lied	"Ein Röslein zog ich mir im Garten", for voice and piano
68	—	50	1878	piano	Variations (12) in D major, for piano
69	—	51	1878	orchestral	Overture in E major, for orchestra
70	—	52	1878	horn and piano	Introduction, Theme and Variations in E♭ major, for horn and piano
71	—	53	1878	chamber music	Piano Trio No.2 in D major, for violin, cello and piano
72	—	57	1879	piano	Aus alter Zeit, eine kleine Gavotte, for piano
73	—	58	1879	piano	Andante in C minor, for piano
74	—	158	1879	Lied	"Für Musik", for voice and piano
76	—	56	1879	chamber music	Introduction, Theme and Variations in G major, for flute and piano
77	—	162	1879	Lied	"Frühlingsanfang", for voice and piano
78	—	161	1879	Lied	"Das rote Laub", for voice and piano
79	—	60	1879	piano	Piano Sonata No.2 in C minor ("Grosse Sonate")
80	—	61	1879	instrumental with orchestra	Romanze in E♭ major, for clarinet and orchestra
81	—	54	1879	piano	Kontrapunkt-Studien II, 9 fugues for piano
82	—	59	1879	piano	Skizzen, pieces (5) for piano
83	—	62	1879	orchestral	Overture in A minor, for orchestra
84	—	163	1879		Hochzeitsmusik (Wedding Music), for piano and toy instruments
85	—	211	1879	chamber music	String Quartet in E♭ major
86	—	63	1879	piano	Scherzo in B minor, for piano
87	—	164	1879	Lied	Die drei Lieder, for voice and piano
88	—	64	1879	Lied	"Im Vaters Garten heimlich steht ein Blümlein", for voice and piano
89	—	165	1880	Lied	"Der Morgen", for voice and piano
92	—	67	1880	choral	Seven four-part songs, for mixed chorus or 4 solo voices: 1. Winterlied; 2. Spielmannsweise; 3. Pfingsten; 4. Käferlied; 5. Waldessang; 6. Schneeglöcklein; 7. Trüb blinken nur die Sterne
94	—	69	1880	orchestral	Symphony No.1 in D minor
95	2	—	1881	chamber music	String Quartet in A major
98	—	72	1880	Lied	"Begegnung", for voice and piano
102	—	169	1880	choral	Festchor for choir with piano accompaniment
103	5	—	1880–1881	piano	Sonata for piano in B minor Sonata in B minor for piano Part 1 Part 2 Part 3 Part 4 All played by Tjako van Schie
105	3	—	1882	piano	Five piano pieces
106	7	—	1882	chamber music	Serenade in E♭ major, for 13 wind instruments Performed by the United States Air Force Heartland of America Band
108	—	183	1881	piano	Nonett in F major, for piano 4-hands
110	8	—	1882	concerto	Violin Concerto in D minor
115	6	—	1882	chamber music	Sonata in F major for cello and piano
117	11	—	1883	concerto	Horn Concerto No. 1 in E♭ major
118	—	75	1883	instrumental with orchestra	Romanze in F major for cello and orchestra (or piano)
124	—	79	1883	orchestral	Lied ohne Worte in E♭ major, for orchestra
125	—	80	1883	orchestral	Concert Overture in C minor, for orchestra
126	12	—	1884	orchestral	Symphony No.2 in F minor
127	9	—	1884	piano	Stimmungsbilder for piano
130	—	81	1884	piano	Improvisation and Fugue on an Original Theme in A minor, for piano
131	14	—	1884	choral (orchestral)	Wandrers Sturmlied, for six-part choir and orchestra
132	4	—	1884	chamber music	Suite in B♭ major, for 13 wind instruments
133	—	82	1884	instrumental with orchestra	Der Zweikampf in B♭ major, polonaise for flute, bassoon, and orchestra
134	—	83	1884	choral	Schwäbische Erbschaft (Der gnäd'ge Herr von Zavelstein) for unaccompanied male choir
135	—	84	1887	orchestral	Festmarsch in D major, for orchestra
136	—	178	1886	chamber music	Festmarsch in D major for piano quartet
137	13	—	1885	chamber music	Piano Quartet in C minor
139	—	179	1885	piano	Cadenza in C minor for Mozart’s Piano Concerto No. 24, K. 491
141	10	—	1885	Lieder	Acht Gedichte aus „Letzte Blätter“ (Eight Poems from "Last Leaves," by Hermann von Gilm), for voice and piano: 1. "Zueignung" (Ja, du weißt es, teure Seele); 2. "Nichts" (Nennen soll ich); 3. "Die Nacht" (Aus dem Walde tritt die Nacht); 4. "Die Georgine" (Warum so spät erst, Georgine?); 5. "Geduld" (Geduld, sagst du und zeigst mit weißem Finger); 6. "Die Verschwiegenen" (Ich habe wohl); 7. "Die Zeitlose" (Auf frischgemähtem Weideplatz); 8. "Allerseelen" (Stell auf den Tisch die duftenden Reseden)
142	—	84a	1885	Lieder	Wer hat's gethan? (Es steht mein Lied in Nacht und Frost) for voice and piano
144	—	181	1886	choral (orchestral)	Bardengesang (Wir litten menschlich seit dem Tage) for male choir and orchestra (not to be confused with Op. 55)
145	—	85	1886	instrumental with orchestra	Burleske in D minor for piano and orchestra
147	16	—	1887	orchestral	Aus Italien, Symphonic Fantasy for large orchestra in G major: 1. Auf der Campagne; 2. In Roms Ruinen; 3. Am Strande von Sorrent; 4. Neapolitanisches Volksleben
148	15	—	1886	Lieder	Five songs for middle voice and piano: 1. "Madrigal" (Ins Joch beug' ich den Nacken); 2. "Winternacht" (Mit Regen und Sturmgebrause); 3. "Lob des Leidens" (Oh schmäht des Lebens Leiden nicht!); 4. "Aus den Liedern der Trauer" (Dem Herzen ähnlich); 5. "Heimkehr" (Leiser schwanken die Äste)
149	17	—	1887	Lieder	Six songs for high voice and piano: 1. "Seitdem dein Aug' in meines schaute" 2. "Ständchen" (Mach' auf); 3. "Das Geheimnis" (Du fragst mich, Mädchen); 4. "Aus den Liedern der Trauer" (Von dunklem Schleier umsponnen); 5. "Nur Mut!" (Laß das Zagen); 6. "Barcarole" (Um der fallenden Ruder Spitzen)
150	—	86	1887	stage work	Incidental music to Shakespeare’s Romeo and Juliet: 1. "Tanzlied zur Moresca"; 2. "Trällerlied"; 3. "Vor dem Hochzeitsbette"; 4. "Trauermusik"
151	18	—	1888	chamber music	Sonata in E♭ major for violin and piano
152	19	—	1888	Lieder	Six songs for voice and piano: 1. "Wozu noch, Mädchen, soll es frommen" 2. "Breit' über mein Haupt dein schwarzes Haar"; 3. "Schön sind, doch kalt die Himmelssterne"; 4. "Wie sollten wir geheim sie halten" 5. "Hoffen und wieder verzagen" 6. "Mein Herz ist stumm, mein Herz ist kalt"
153	22	—	1888	Lieder	Mädchenblumen for voice and piano: 1. "Kornblumen" (Kornblumen nenn' ich die Gestalten); 2. "Mohnblumen" (Mohnblumen sind die runden); 3. "Epheu" (Aber Epheu nenn' ich jene Madchen); 4. "Wasserrose" (Kennst du die Blume, die märchenhafte)
155	—	—	1888	horn and piano	Andante in C major, for horn and piano (for his revered father on his silver wedding anniversary)
156	20	—	1889	orchestral	Don Juan, tone poem after Lenau
157	—	87	1889	orchestral	Festmarsch in C major, for orchestra
158	24	—	1890	orchestral	Tod und Verklärung, (Death and Transfiguration), tone poem for orchestra
159	—	88	1889	choral	Utan svafvel och fosfor (Swedish matchbox text), for unaccompanied male choir
160	21	—	1889	Lieder	Schlichte Weisen, five songs for voice and piano: 1. "All mein' Gedanken"; 2. "Du meines Herzens Krönelein"; 3. "Ach Lieb, ich muß nun scheiden" 4. "Ach weh mir unglückhaftem Mann"; 5. "Die Frauen sind oft fromm und still"
161	—	186	1890	stage work	New version of Gluck's opera Iphigenie auf Tauris arranged for orchestra
163	23	—	1890	orchestral	Macbeth, tone poem after Shakespeare for orchestra
166	26	—	1891	Lieder	Two songs for voice and piano: 1. "Frühlingsgedränge" (Frühlingskinder im bunten Gedränge); 2. "O wärst du mein"
167	—	89	1892	stage work	Lebende Bilder, Festmusik
168	25	—	1894	opera	Guntram, opera in three acts
169	—	182	1893	chamber music	Two Pieces for piano quartet: 1. "Arabischer Tanz"; 2. "Liebesliedchen"
170	27	—	1894	Lieder	Four songs for voice and piano, all later with orchestral accompaniment: 1. "Ruhe, meine Seele!" (Nicht ein Lüftchen regt sich leise); 2. "Cäcilie" (Wenn du es wüßtest); 3. "Heimliche Aufforderung" (Auf, hebe die funkelnde Schale); 4. "Morgen!" (Und morgen wird die Sonne wieder scheinen)
171	28	—	1895	orchestral	Till Eulenspiegels lustige Streiche, tone poem for orchestra
172	29	—	1895	Lieder	Three songs for high voice and piano: 1. "Traum durch die Dämmerung" (Weite Wiesen im Dämmergrau); 2. "Schlagende Herzen" (Über Wiesen und Felder ein Knabe ging); 3. "Nachtgang" (Wir gingen durch die stille milde Nacht)
173	31	—	1896	Lieder	Four songs for voice and piano: 1. "Blauer Sommer" (Ein blauer Sommer glanz- und glutenschwer); 2. "Wenn" (Und wärst du mein Weib); 3. "Weißer Jasmin" (Bleiche Blute); 4. "Stiller Gang" (Der Abend graut)
174	32	—	1896	Lieder	Five songs for voice and piano: 1. "Ich trage meine Minne"; 2. "Sehnsucht" (Ich ging den Weg entlang); 3. "Liebeshymnus" (Heil jenem Tag); 4. "O süßer Mai!"; 5. "Himmelsboten" (Der Mondschein)
175	—	90	1896	Lied	"Wir beide wollen springen" (Es ging ein Wind durchs weite Land), for voice and piano
176	30	—	1896	orchestral	Also sprach Zarathustra, tone poem freely after Nietzsche, for orchestra
180	33	—	1896	Lieder (orchestral)	Four songs for voice and orchestra: 1. "Verführung" (Der Tag, der schwüle); 2. "Gesang der Apollopriesterin" (Es ist der Tag, wo jedes Leid vergessen); 3. "Hymnus" (Daß du mein Auge wecktest); 4. "Pilgers Morgenlied" (Morgennebel, Lila)
181	38	—	1897	melodrama	Enoch Arden, for speaker and piano, text by Alfred, Lord Tennyson
182	34	—	1898	choral	Two songs for sixteen-part unaccompanied choir: 1. "Der Abend" (Senke, strahlender Gott); 2. "Jakob" (Jakob! Dein verlorner Sohn)
183	—	91	1897	choral (orchestral)	Licht du ewiglich Eines, hymn for brass choir, orchestra and female choir
184	35	—	1898	orchestral	Don Quixote, Fantastic Variations on a Theme of Knightly Character, for cello and orchestra
186	36	—	1897	Lieder	Four songs for high voice and piano: 1. "Das Rosenband" (Im Frühlingsschatten fand ich sie); 2. "Für fünfzehn Pfennige" (Das Mägdlein will ein' Freier hab'n); 3. "Hat gesagt – bleibt's nicht dabei" (Mein Vater hat gesagt); 4. "Anbetung" (Die Liebste steht mir vor den Gedanken)
187	37	—	1898	Lieder	Six songs for high voice and piano: 1. "Glückes genug" (Wenn sanft du mir im Arme schliefst); 2. "Ich liebe dich" (Vier ad'lige Rosse); 3. "Meinem Kinde" (Du schläfst und sachte neig' ich mich); 4. "Mein Auge" (Du bist mein Auge!); 5. "Herr Lenz" (Herr Lenz springt heute durch die Stadt); 6. "Hochzeitlich Lied" (Laß Akaziendüfte schaukeln)
189	39	—	1898	Lieder	Five songs for voice and piano: 1. "Leises Lied" (In einem stillen Garten); 2. "Junghexenlied" (Als nachts ich überm Gebirge ritt); 3. "Der Arbeitsmann" (Wir haben ein Bett); 4. "Befreit" (Du wirst nicht weinen); 5. "Lied an meinen Sohn" (Der Sturm behorcht mein Vaterhaus)
190	40	—	1898	orchestral	Ein Heldenleben, tone poem for orchestra
191	—	92	1899	melodrama	Das Schloss am Meere for narrator and piano
192	—	93	1899	choral	Soldatenlied (Wenn man beim Wein sitzt) for unaccompanied male choir
193	45	—	1899	choral	Three choruses for unaccompanied male voices: 1. Schlachtgesang" (Kein selig'r Tod ist in der Welt); 2. "Lied der Freundschaft" (Der Mensch hat nichts so eigen); 3. "Der Brauttanz" (Tanz, der du Gesetze unsern Füßen gibst)
194	42	—	1899	choral	Two compositions for unaccompanied male choir: 1. Liebe" (Nichts Bessers ist auf dieser Erd); 2. "Altdeutsches Schlachtlied" (Frisch auf, ihr tapferen Soldaten)
195	41	—	1899	Lieder	Five songs for voice and piano: 1. "Wiegenlied" (Träume, träume, du mein süßes Leben); 2. "In der Campagna" (Ich grübe die Sonne); 3. "Am Ufer" (Die Welt verstummt); 4. "Bruder Liederlich" (Die Feder am Strohhut); 5. "Leise Lieder" (Leise Leider sing' ich dir)
196	43	—	1899	Lieder	Three songs for high voice and piano: 1. "An sie" (Zeit, Verkündigerin der besten Freuden); 2. "Muttertändelei" (Steht mir doch mein schönes Kind); 3. "Die Ulme zu Hirsau" (Zu Hirsau in den Trümmern)
197	44	—	1899	Lieder (orchestral)	Two songs for low voice and orchestra: 1. "Notturno" (Hoch hing der Mond); 2. "Nächtlicher Gang" (Die Fahnen flattern im Mitternachtssturm)
199	46	—	1900	Lieder	Five poems for voice and piano: 1. "Ein Obdach gegen Sturm und Regen"; 2. "Gestern war ich Atlas"; 3. "Die sieben Siegel" (Weil ich dich nicht legen kann); 4. "Morgenrot" (Dort, wo der Morgenstern hergeht); 5. "Ich sehe wie in einem Spiegel"
200	47	—	1900	Lieder	Five songs for voice and piano: 1. "Auf ein Kind" (Aus der Bedrängnis); 2. "Des Dichters Abendgang" (Ergehst du dich im Abendlicht); 3. "Rückleben" (An ihrem Grabe kniet' ich fest gebunden); 4. "Einkehr" (Bei einem Wirte wundermild); 5. "Von den sieben Zechbrüdern" (Ich kenne sieben list'ge Brüder)
201	—	230	1900	ballet	Kythere, ballet
202	48	—	1900	Lieder	Five songs for voice and piano; orchestrated 1918: 1. "Freundliche Vision" (Nicht im Schlafe hab ich das geträumt); 2. "Ich schwebe" (Ich schwebe wie auf Engelsschwingen); 3. "Kling!" (Meine Seele gibt reinen Ton); 4. "Winterweihe" (In diesen Wintertagen); 5. "Winterliebe" (Der Sonne entgegen)
203	50	—	1901	opera	Feuersnot, opera in one act
204	49	—	1901	Lieder	Eight songs for voice and piano, orchestrated 1918: 1. "Waldseligkeit" (Der Wald beginnt zu rauschen); 2. "In goldener Fülle" (Wir schreiten in goldener Fülle); 3. "Wiegenliedchen" (Bienchen, Bienchen wiegt sich im Sonnenschein); 4. "Das Lied des Steinklopfers" (Ich bin kein Minister); 5. "Sie wissen's nicht" (Es wohnt ein kleines Vögelein); 6. "Junggesellenschwur" (Weine nur nicht); 7. "Wer lieben will, muß leiden" 8. "Ach, was Kummer, Qual und Schmerzen"
206	51	—	1903	Lieder (orchestral)	Two songs for low bass voice and orchestra: 1. "Das Tal" (Wie willst du dich mir offenbaren); 2. "Der Einsame" (Wo ich bin, mich rings umdunkelt)
207	52	—	1903	choral (orchestral)	Taillefer, ballad for soprano, tenor, baritone, chorus and orchestra
208	—	95	1903	choral	Hans Huber in Vitznau , canon for four voices in C major
209	53	—	1903	orchestral	Symphonia Domestica, tone poem for orchestra
209a	73	—	1925	piano and orchestra	Parergon zur Symphonia Domestica for piano (left hand) and orchestra
211	—	96	1904	stage work	Zwei Lieder aus 'Der Richter von Zalamea', two songs for the play by Pedro Calderón de la Barca: 1. "Liebesliedchen" for tenor, guitar, harp 2. "Lied der Chispa" (for mezzo-soprano, one-part male choir, guitar, 2 harps
213	—	97	1905	piano	Parademarsch No. 1 in E♭ major
214	—	99	1905	piano	De Brandenburgsche Mars, presentation march
215	54	—	1905	opera	Salome, opera in one act
215a	—	—	1905	orchestral	Salome's Dance ("Dance of the Seven Veils") for orchestra
216	—	101	1905	choral	Sechs Volksliedbearbeitungen for male choir: 1. "Geistlicher Maien"; 2. "Misslungene Liebesjagd"; 3. "Tummler"; 4. "Hüt du dich!" 5. "Wächterlied"; 6. "Kuckuck"
217	—	100	1906	piano	Königsmarsch in E♭ major for piano (or orchestra)
218	—	102	1906	vocal	Der Graf von Rom, vocalise for voice and piano
219	55	—	1907	choral (orchestral)	Bardengesang (Herbei, herbei, wo der Kühnsten Wunde blutet) for three male 4-part choirs and orchestra
220	56	—	1906	Lieder	Six songs for voice and piano: 1. "Gefunden" (Ich ging im Walde so für mich hin); 2. "Blindenklage" (Wenn ich dich frage); 3. "Im Spätboot" (Aus der Schiffsbank mach ich meinen Pfühl); 4. "Mit deinen blauen Augen"; 5. "Frühlingsfeier" (Das ist des Frühlings traurige Lust!); 6. "Die heiligen drei Könige aus Morgenland"
221	57	—	1907	orchestral	Two military marches for orchestra: "Kriegsmarsch" 1) in E♭ major, 2) in C minor
222	—	98	1907	orchestral	Parademarsch No. 2
223	58	—	1909	opera	Elektra, tragedy in one act
224	—	103	1909	fanfare	Feierlicher Einzug der Ritter des Johanniterordens for brass and timpani
227	59	—	1911	opera	Der Rosenkavalier, opera in three acts
228	60	—	1912	opera	Ariadne auf Naxos, opera in one act
228c	60	—	1918	orchestral	Le bourgeois gentilhomme, suite for chamber orchestra
229	61	—	1913	orchestral	Festliches Präludium for orchestra and organ
230	62	—	1913	vocal/choral	Deutsche Motette (German motet, "Die Schöpfung ist zur Ruh gegangen") for 4 solo voices and 16-part unaccompanied choir
231	63	—	1914	ballet	Josephslegende, ballet in one act
232	—	104	1914	cantata	Cantate ("Tüchtigen stellt das schnelle Glück hoch empor") for 4-part unaccompanied male choir
233	64	—	1915	orchestral	An Alpine Symphony, tone poem for orchestra
234	65	—	1919	opera	Die Frau ohne Schatten, opera in three acts
234a	—	146	1947	orchestral	Symphonische Fantasie aus 'Die Frau ohne Schatten'
235	68	—	1918	Lieder	Six songs (after poems of Clemens Brentano) for voice and piano, orchestrated 1940: 1. "An die Nacht" (Heilige Nacht!); 2. "Ich wollt ein Sträußlein binden" 3. "Säus'le, liebe Myrthe!"; 4. "Als mir dein Lied erklang" (Dein Lied erklang, ich habe es gehört); 5. "Amor" (An dem Feuer saß das Kind); 6. "Lied der Frauen" (Wenn es stürmt auf den Wogen)
236	66	—	1918	song cycle	Krämerspiegel, twelve songs for voice and piano: 1. "Es war einmal ein Bock"; 2. "Einst kam der Bock als Bote"; 3. "Es liebte einst ein Hase"; 4. "Drei Masken sah ich am Himmel stehn" 5. "Hast du ein Tongedicht vollbracht" 6. "O lieber Künstler sei ermahnt" 7. "Unser Feind ist, großer Gott"; 8. "Von Händlern wird die Kunst bedroht" 9. "Es war mal eine Wanze"; 10. "Die Künstler sind die Schöpfer"; 11. "Die Händler und die Macher"; 12. "O Schröpferschwarm, o Händlerkreis"
237	69	—	1918	Lieder	Five Little Songs, for voice and piano: 1. "Der Stern" (Ich sehe ihn wieder); 2. "Der Pokal" (Freunde, weihet den Pokal); 3. "Einerlei" (Ihr Mund ist stets derselbe); 4. "Waldesfahrt" (Mein Wagen rollet langsam); 5. "Schlechtes Wetter" (Das ist ein schlechtes Wetter)
238	67	—	1918	Lieder	Six songs for high voice and piano: Three songs of Ophelia from Shakespeare's Hamlet; 1. "Wie erkenn' ich mein Treulieb?"; 2. "Guten Morgen, 's ist Sankt Valentinstag"; 3. "Sie trugen ihn auf der Bahre bloß"; Three songs (West-östlicher Diwan); 1. "Wer wird von der Welt verlangen" 2. "Hab'ich euch denn je geraten" 3. "Wanderers Gemütsruhe" (Übers Niederträchtige niemand sich beklage)
239	—	105	1919	Lied	"Sinnspruch" (Alle Menschen groß und klein), for voice and piano
240	71	—	1921	vocal (orchestral)	Three hymns for high voice and orchestra: 1. "Hymne an die Liebe" (Froh der süßen Augenweide); 2. "Rückkehr in die Heimat" (Ihr linden Lüfte); 3. "Liebe" (Wenn ihr Freunde vergesst)
243	70	—	1922	ballet	Schlagobers, ballet in two acts
244	87	106	1929	Lied	2. "Erschaffen und Beleben" (Herr Adam war ein Erdenkloß); from "Four songs for high bass and piano, Op. 87"
245	—	107	1923	chamber music	Tanzsuite aus Klavierstücken von François Couperin (also known as Couperin Suite 1), for small orchestra
245a	—	128	1941	ballet	Verklungene Feste: Tanzvisionen aus zwei Jahrhunderten, ballet after keyboard pieces by Couperin (The 1923 Dance suite was extended with additional music).
245b	86	—	1941	chamber music	Divertimento aus Klavierstücken von François Couperin für kleines Orchester (the additional music composed for Verklungene Feste was put together into the Divertimento along with some additional material). Also known as Couperin Suite 2
246	72	—	1924	opera	Intermezzo, opera in two acts
247	—	108	1924	chamber music	Wedding Prelude (Hochzeitspräludium) for two harmoniums in B♭ major
248	—	109	1924	fanfare	Wiener Philharmoniker Fanfare (Vienna Philharmonic Fanfare), for brass and timpani
249	—	190	1924	orchestral	Die Ruinen von Athen after Beethoven's work of the same name
250	—	110	1924	fanfare	Fanfare zur Eröffnung der Musikwoche der Stadt Wien for 22 brass instruments and 2 timpani
251	—	111	1925	Lied	"Durch allen Schall und Klang", for voice and piano
254	74	—	1928	piano and orchestra	Panathenäenzug (Pan-Athenian Procession) (see: Panathenaic Games), symphonic study for piano (left hand) and orchestra
255	75	—	1928	opera	Die ägyptische Helena, opera in two acts
256	76	—	1928	choral (orchestral)	Die Tageszeiten (Times of the Day), song cycle for male choir and orchestra: 1. "Der Morgen" (Wenn der Hahn kräht auf dem Dache); 2. "Mittagsruh" (Über Bergen, Fluss und Talen); 3. "Der Abend" (Schweigt der Menschen laute Lust); 4. "Die Nacht" (Wie schön, hier zu verträumen)
257	77	—	1928	Lieder	Gesänge des Orients, five songs for voice and piano: 1. "Ihre Augen" (Deine gewölbten Brauen); 2. "Schwung" (Gebt mir meinen Becher!); 3. "Liebesgeschenke" (Ich pflückte eine kleine Pfirsichblüte); 4. "Die Allmächtige" (Die höchste Macht der Erde); 5. "Huldigung" (Die Perlen meiner Seele)
258	87	114	1929	Lied	3. "Und dann nicht mehr" (Ich sah sie nur ein einzigmal); from "Four songs for high bass and piano, Op. 87"
259	78	—	1929	choral (orchestral)	"Austria" (Wo sich der ewige Schnee), for male choir and orchestra
260	87	115	1929	Lied	1. "Vom künftigen Alter" (Der Frost hat mir bereifet); from "Four songs for high bass and piano, Op. 87"
262	—	191	1930	orchestral	Idomeneo act 2 and 3 for Mozart's opera Idomeneo
263	79	—	1933	opera	Arabella, opera in three acts
264	88	118	1933	Lied	1. "Das Bächlein" (Du Bächlein silberhell und klar); from "Three songs for voice and piano, Op. 88"
265	80	—	1935	opera	Die schweigsame Frau, comic opera in three acts
266	—	119	1936	choral (orchestral)	Olympic Hymn (Völker! Seid des Volkes Gäste) for choir and orchestra
267	—	120	1935	choral	Die Göttin im Putzzimmer (Welche chaotische Haushälterei) for 8-part unaccompanied choir
268	87	121	1929	Lied	4. "Im Sonnenschein" (Noch eine Stunde lasst mich hier verweilen); from "Four songs for high bass and piano, Op. 87"
269	—	122	1935	Lied	"Zugemessne Rhythmen", for voice and piano
270	—	123	1935	choral	Three Male Choruses (unaccompanied): 1. "Vor den Türen" (Ich habe geklopft an des Reichtums Haus); 2. "Traumlicht" (Ein Licht im Traum hat mich besucht); 3. "Fröhlich im Maien" (Blühende Frauen, lasset euch schauen)
271	81	—	1938	opera	Friedenstag, opera in one act
272	82	—	1938	opera	Daphne, opera in one act
272a	—	132	1943	choral	An den Baum Daphne for unaccompanied boys choir and two SATB choirs; epilogue to Daphne, Op. 82
273	—	124	1939	choral	Durch Einsamkeiten for unaccompanied male choir
274	—	125	1939	orchestral	München, commemorative waltz for orchestra, 1st version
274a	—	140	1945	orchestral	München, commemorative waltz for orchestra, 2nd version; premiered 1951
277	84	—	1940	orchestral	Japanische Festmusik for orchestra
278	83	256	1940	opera	Die Liebe der Danae, opera in three acts
279	85	—	1942	opera	Capriccio, opera in one act
280	88	129	1942	Lied	3. "Sankt Michael" (Ein Mahl für uns und ein Licht für dich); from "Three songs for voice and piano, Op. 88"
281	88	130	1942	Lied	2. "Blick vom oberen Belvedere" (Fülle du! Gezier und schöner Geist); from "Three songs for voice and piano, Op. 88"
282	—	131	1942	Lied	"Xenion" (Nichts vom Vergänglichen), for voice and piano
283	—	132	1942	concerto	Horn Concerto No. 2 in E♭ major
286	—	133	1943	fanfare	Festmusik der Stadt Wien for brass and timpani
288	—	135	1943	chamber music	Sonatina No 1 in F major (Aus der Werkstatt eines Invaliden) for 16 wind instruments
289	—	136	1943	vocal	"Wer tritt herein" (Wer tritt herein so fesch und schlank?) for one voice
290	—	142	1945	orchestral	Metamorphosen study for 23 solo strings
291	—	143	1946	chamber music	Sonatina No 2 in E♭ major (Fröhliche Werkstatt) for 16 wind instruments
292	—	144	1945	concerto	Oboe Concerto in D major
293	—	147	1947	concerto	Duett-Concertino in F major for clarinet and bassoon with string orchestra and harp
294	—	300	1949	Singspiel	Des Esels Schatten, Singspiel in one act (premiered 1964)
295	—	149	1948	chamber music	Allegretto in E major for violin and piano
296	—	150	1948	Lieder (orchestral)	Vier letzte Lieder for high voice and orchestra: 1. "Frühling" (In dämmrigen Grüften); 2. "September" (Der Garten trauert); 3. "Beim Schlafengehen" (Nun der Tag mich müd' gemacht); 4. "Im Abendrot" (Wir sind durch Not und Freude gegangen)
297	—	304	1948	Lied	"Malven" (Aus Rosen, Phlox), for voice and piano; premiered in 1985
298	—	306	1949	choral (orchestral)	Besinnung (Göttlich ist und ewig der Geist) for mixed choir and orchestra

== See also ==
- List of operas by Richard Strauss
- Tone poems (Strauss)
