= Der Arbeitsmann =

- Lied by Richard Strauss
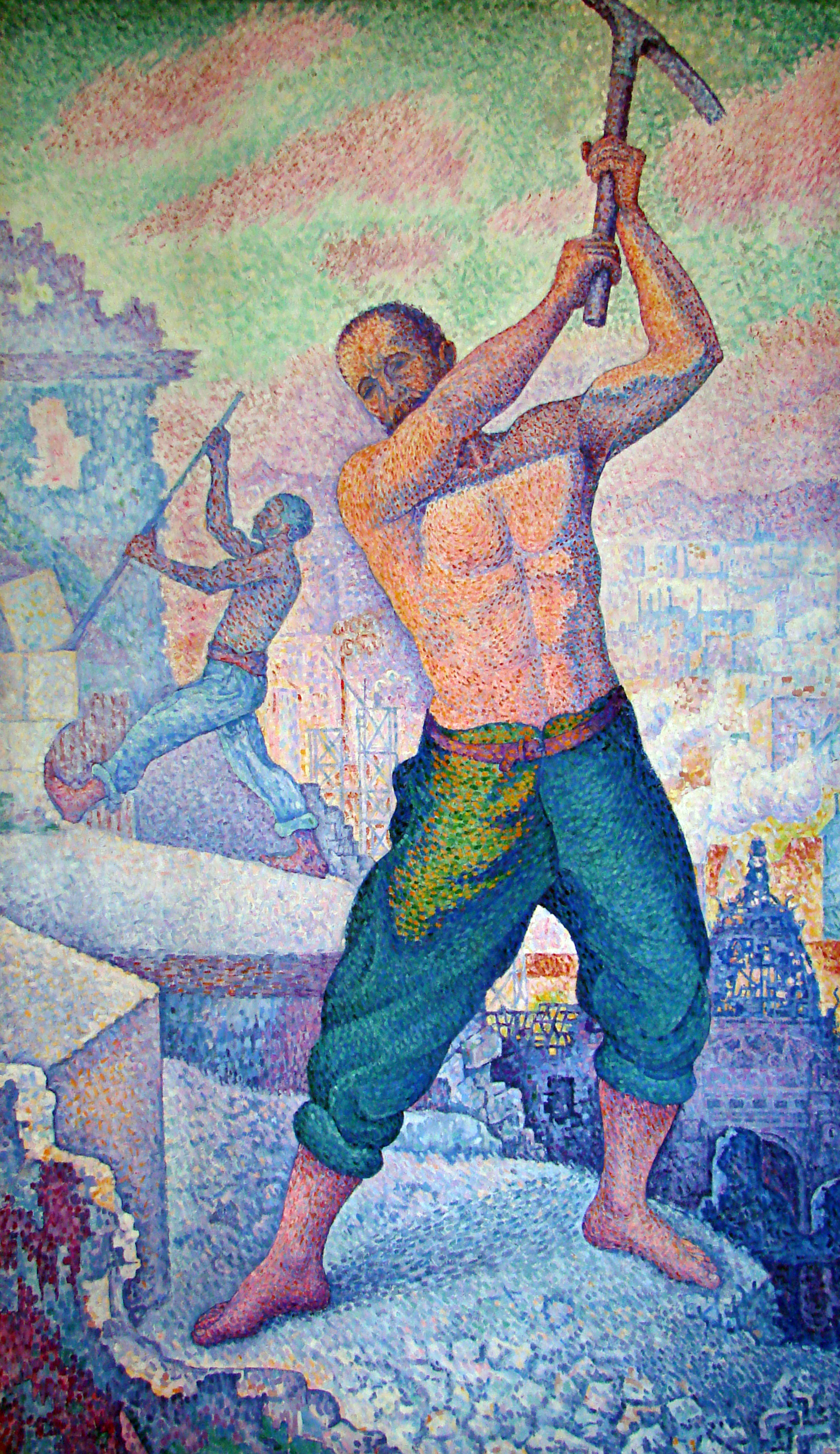
- The Demolition man, Paul Signac (1898).
- English: The Workman
- Catalogue: TrV 189
- Opus: 39, No. 3
- Text: Poem by Richard Dehmel
- Language: German
- Composed: June 12, 1898.
- Dedication: Fritz Sieger
- Scoring: Voice and piano

"Der Arbeitsmann" (English: The workman) is an art song for voice and piano composed by Richard Strauss in 1889, setting a poem by the German poet Richard Dehmel. The song is part of the collection Fünf Lieder für hohe Singstimme mit Pianofortebegleitung (English: Five songs for high voice with piano accompaniment). Strauss orchestrated the song in 1918.

== Composition history ==
Strauss set 11 poems by the German poet Richard Dehmel over the period 1895-1901, four of them in his Opus 39 collection (Leises Lied, Befreit and Lied am meinem Sohn being the other Opus 39 Dehmel settings) and another the 1899 orchestral song Notturno. Dehmel was a controversial figure in the Germany of Kaiser Wilhelm II, a socialist who had been convicted for blasphemy in Berlin during 1897. He was the same age as Strauss, and “Dehmel worked squarely within the aesthetic territory occupied by Strauss”. Whilst Strauss had little interest in the politics of Dehmel, he shared the Nietzschean perspective that human lives are lived among and controlled by physical forces. Whilst the two had corresponded for several years, they first met on March 23, 1899 (Hugo von Hofmannsthal was accompanying Dehmel, and also met Strauss for the first time).

According to Norman Del Mar, "Strauss was the last one to become involved in social reform, but where his art was concerned he was equally fearless in his adoption of inflammatory subject-material. Hence, when during his study of Dehmel his eye lighted upon this stirring poem of protest, he entertained no more thought of the disapproval it might arouse than he would a few years later, over the sexual extravagances of Wilde's Salome. To him, here was a magnificent vehicle for music, and of it he made one of his very greatest songs, full of drama and pathos". Alan Jefferson wrote:

Der Arbeitsmann...is a hard and remorseless setting to equally rough and rugged words that express extreme bitterness, while again the character in the poem who utters them seems, although forced to do the most wretched and demeaning work, to possess some education. The almost military funeral march in F minor which pervades the song has a fearsome...accompaniment for the pianist, extremely difficilt as it is written. Only the last two bars of the song are free of accidentals.; and the doleful and pessimistic harmonies, constantly shifting, spell the tota unhappiness and hopelessness of the workman. Only the mention of walks in the fields on Sundays brings a major key introduction - F Major - and the descending thirds with trills to signify the totally free birds. But this is soon turned back into despairing downward thrustsof the piano as it grows in fierceness and intensity. Iron is in the soul of the singer, for time is against him, time - for him - is out of joint.

Following Strauss, several composers wrote songs that were settings of Dehmel poems, including Reger, Schoenberg, Sibelius and Szymanowski. Hans Erich Pfitzner also set the poem Der Arbeitsmann in his op. 30 (4 Lieder) no. 4 in 1922.

== Lyrics ==
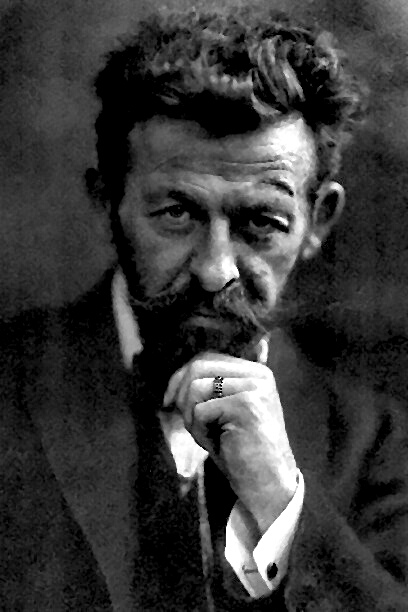
Richard Dehmel, author of lyrics

The poem Der Arbeitsmann comes from the volume of Dehmel's poetry titled "Weib und Welt" (Woman and the World), which a German court condemned as obscene and blasphemous, ordering that all copies of it be burned.

Der Arbeitsmann

Wir haben ein Bett, wir haben ein Kind,
mein Weib!
Wir haben auch Arbeit, und gar zu zweit,
und haben die Sonne und Regen und Wind,
und uns fehlt nur eine Kleinigkeit,
um so frei zu sein, wie die Vögel sind:
nur Zeit.

Wenn wir Sonntags durch die Felder gehn,
mein Kind,
und über den Ähren weit und breit
das blaue Schwalbenvolk blitzen sehn,
o dann fehlt uns nicht das bißchen Kleid,
um so schön zu sein, wie die Vögel sind:
nur Zeit.

Nur Zeit! wir wittern Gewitterwind,
wir Volk.
Nur eine kleine Ewigkeit;
uns fehlt ja nichts, mein Weib, mein Kind,
als all das, was durch uns gedeiht,
um so [froh]1 zu sein, wie die Vögel sind:
nur Zeit.

The Workman

We have a bed, we have a child,
My wife!
We have also work - work for two,
and have the sun and rain and wind;
and we lack just one small thing
to be as free as the birds are:
Just time.

When on Sundays we go through the fields,
My child,
And above the corn, far and wide,
the blue swallows can be seen flashing,
Oh, then, we lack no items of clothing
to be as fine as the birds are:
Just time.

Just time! We sense a stormwind,
we the people.
Just one small eternity;
We lack nothing, my wife, my child,
but all that thrives through us,
to be as bold as the birds are:
Just time.

== Orchestral arrangement ==
In 1918 Strauss orchestrated the song (completed December 19). The orchestral song was first performed at a lunchtime concert in Berlin on April 20, 1919, sung by tenor Ernst Kraus with the composer conducting the Berlin Philharmonic. The orchestration is lavish: amongst the largest forces called for in his orchestral songs.

- Piccolo, Two flutes, two oboes, english horn, Eflat Clarinet, two clarinets, two basset horns, bass clarinet, three bassoons, double bassoon.
- Six french horns, two trumpets, three trombones, two tubas
- Bass drum, snare drum
- Strings

The orchestral version of the song was lost for a considerable period of time. It would have been politically unacceptable during the Nazi period. When Norman Del Mar was writing his 1972 biography of Strauss, he came across a 1941 letter to bass-baritone Hans Hotter which mentioned an orchestral version of the song that he had in Vienna that would suit Hotter's voice. Del Mar dates the orchestration as 1940 (assuming that Strauss had only recently written it before the Hotter letter). He wrote "...it is tantalizing that up to the time of writing no trace of the score or parts has been found, or even evidence that the orchestral version ever reached performance". Since then, the score was found and the song has been performed and recorded.
