= Tone poems (Strauss) =

Group of compositions by Richard Strauss

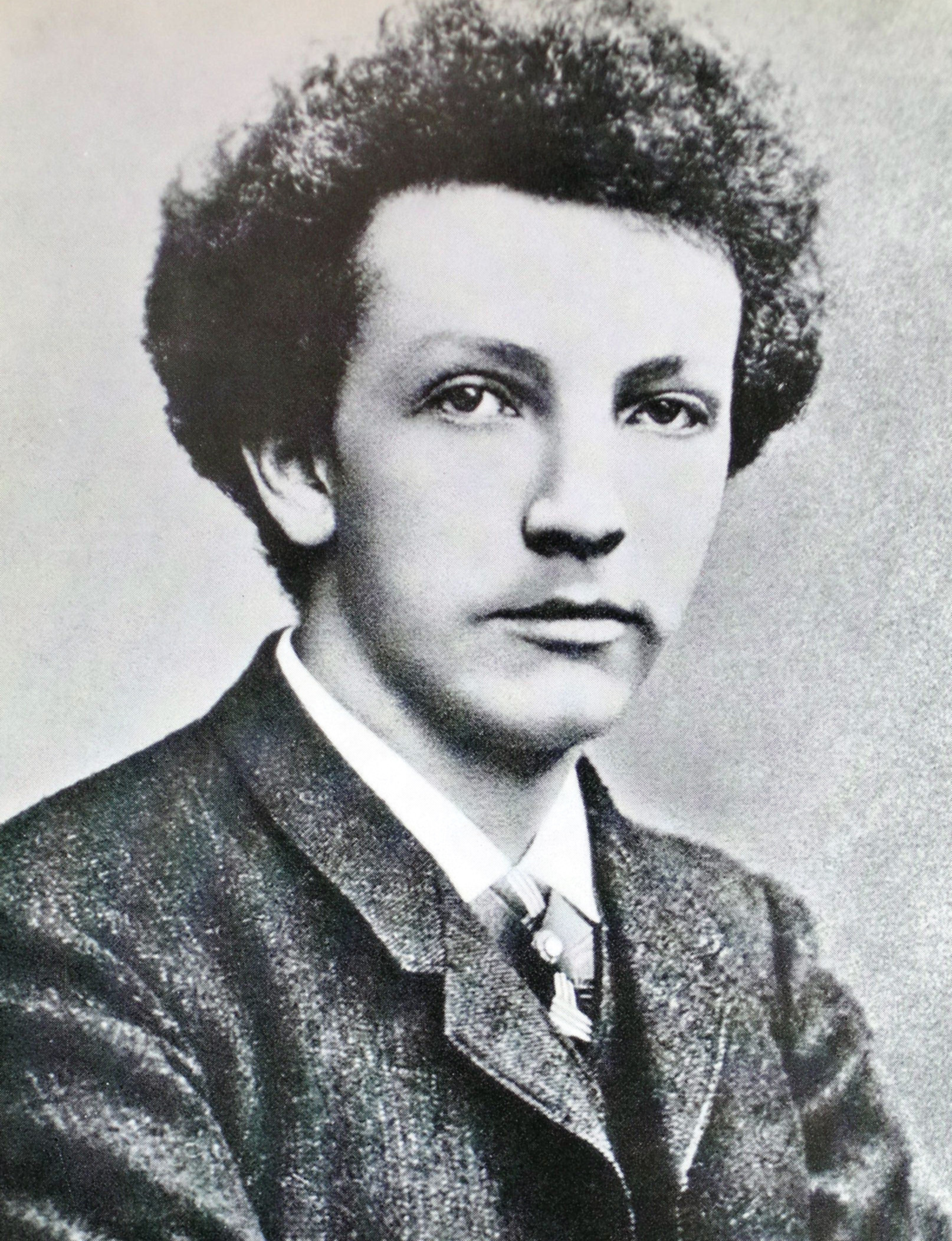
Richard Strauss in 1888.

The tone poems of Richard Strauss are noted as the high point of program music in the latter part of the 19th century, extending its boundaries and taking the concept of realism in music to an unprecedented level. In these works, he widened the expressive range of music while depicting subjects many times thought unsuitable for musical depiction. As Hugh Macdonald points out in the New Grove Dictionary of Music and Musicians, "In the years prior to World War I these works were held to be in the vanguard of modernism."

== List (in order of opus number) ==
- excerpt from Don Juan
  Aus Italien (From Italy), Op. 16 (1886)
- Don Juan, Op. 20 (1888)
- Macbeth, Op. 23 (1888)
- Tod und Verklärung (Death and Transfiguration), Op. 24 (1889)
- Till Eulenspiegels lustige Streiche (Till Eulenspeigel's Merry Pranks), Op. 28 (1895)
- Also sprach Zarathustra (Thus Spoke Zarathustra), Op. 30 (1896)
- Don Quixote, Op. 35 (1897)
- Ein Heldenleben (A Hero's Life), Op. 40 (1898)
- Symphonia Domestica, Op. 53 (1903)
- Eine Alpensinfonie (An Alpine Symphony), Op. 64 (1915)

Note that Macbeth was actually written before Don Juan and Death & Transfiguration, but premiered after both of them.

== History ==
After leaving the Ludwig-Maximilians-Universität München in 1883, Strauss left for Dresden, then Berlin, where he heard Hans von Bülow as pianist and conductor with the Meiningen orchestra. Bülow performed Strauss's Serenade and commissioned another work from the young composer. This work, a Suite in B-flat, became Strauss's debut as a conductor in 1884 when Bülow informed him that he would lead the Meiningen orchestra in it without the benefit of a rehearsal. The following year, Strauss became assistant conductor of the Meiningen orchestra, attending all of Bulow's rehearsals with pencil and paper in hand.

Bülow exposed Strauss to the "music of the future" through his acquaintance with Alexander Ritter, a composer and violinist who had married Richard Wagner's niece and himself had written six symphonic poems similar to those of Franz Liszt. Strauss may have already been turning away from the conservative style of music, influenced by the music of Johannes Brahms, that he had been writing up to that point. Nevertheless, through Ritter he became acquainted with Liszt's symphonic poems. He soon started voicing the slogan, "New ideas must seek new forms" as central to Liszt's symphonic works, and from this point he considered abstract sonata form to be little more than "a hollow shell." Strauss left Meiningen in 1886 for a conducting position in Munich, which allowed him regular evenings "to exchange noble ideas and to listen to the teachings of the Lisztian Ritter," who had moved to Munich in September 1886.

Before taking up his post in Munich, Strauss spent several weeks touring Italy, during which he took his "first hesitant step" into writing programmatic music by composing sketches for Aus Italien. As his duties in Munich were lighter than those in Meiningen, Strauss also had increased time to think about music and aesthetics while his friendship with Ritter deepened. He became convinced that an artist's duty included creating "a new form for every new subject" and addressed this problem with Macbeth, the piece which would become his first fully fledged tone poem. Eight months after completing it, he would write Don Juan. Its premiere earned Strauss a name as a modernist.

As he continued to make a name for himself as both conductor and composer, Strauss continued writing tone poems steadily through the 1880s. He took a six-year break from the form while he worked on his first opera, Guntram, but the opera's failure showed Strauss that there was still much to master when it came to narrative in purely orchestral form. Most of the tone poems written after this hiatus are significantly longer and larger in their orchestral demands than their predecessors. By 1898, he had composed Till Eulenspiegel, Also sprach Zarathustra, Don Quixote and Ein Heldenleben.

== Characteristics ==
Strauss wrote on a wide range of subjects, some of which had been previously considered unsuitable to be set to music, including literature, legend, philosophy and autobiography. In doing so, he elevated orchestral technique to a new level of complexity, taking realism in orchestral depiction to unprecedented lengths, widening the expressive functions of program music as well as extending its boundaries. Because of his virtuoso use of orchestration, the descriptive power and vividness of these works is extremely marked. He usually employs a large orchestra, often with extra instruments, and he often uses instrumental effects for sharp characterization, such as portraying the bleating of sheep with cuivré brass as well as fluttertongued reeds in Don Quixote.

Strauss's handling of form is also worth noting, both in his use of thematic transformation and his handling of multiple themes in intricate counterpoint. His use of variation form in Don Quixote is handled exceptionally well, as is his use of rondo form in Till Eulenspiegel. As Hugh MacDonald points out in the New Grove (1980), "Strauss liked to use a simple but descriptive theme—for instance the three-note motif at the opening of Also sprach Zarathustra, or striding, vigorous arpeggios to represent the manly qualities of his heroes. His love themes are honeyed and chromatic and generally richly scored, and he is often fond of the warmth and serenity of diatonic harmony as balm after torrential chromatic textures, notably at the end of Don Quixote, where the solo cello has a surpassingly beautiful D major transformation of the main theme."

== See also ==
- List of compositions by Richard Strauss
- List of operas by Richard Strauss

== Bibliography ==
- Sadie, Stanley; Tyrrell, John (2001). The new Grove dictionary of music and musicians. ISBN 0-333-60800-3.
  - Gillam, Bryan, "Strauss, Richard (Georg)."
  - Macdonald, Hugh, "Symphonic poem."
