= Ständchen (Strauss) =

19th-century art song by Richard Strauss

- Lied by Richard Strauss
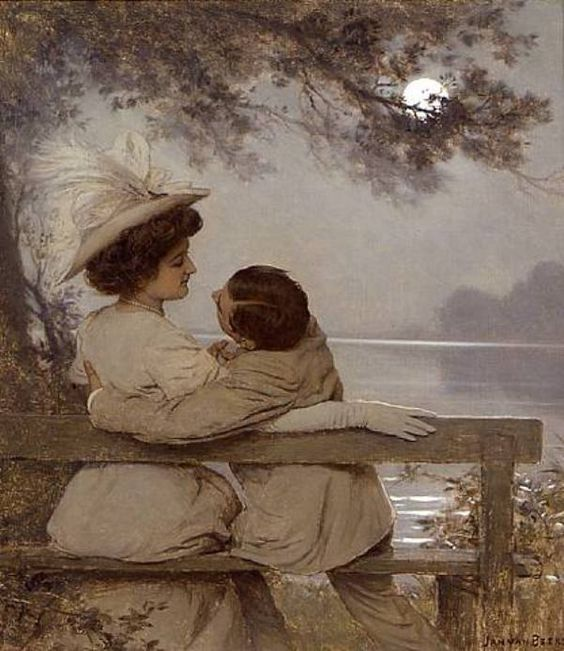
- The lovers, Jan van Beers, 1885.
- English: Serenade
- Catalogue: TrV 149/II
- Opus: 17, No. 2
- Text: Poem by Adolf Friedrich von Schack
- Language: German
- Composed: December 22, 1886, Munich
- Scoring: Voice and piano

"Ständchen" ("Serenade") is an art song composed by Richard Strauss in 1886, setting a poem of the same title by the German poet Adolf Friedrich von Schack. It is the second of his Six songs for high voice and piano, Op. 17, TrV 149, all set to Schack poems.

== Composition history ==
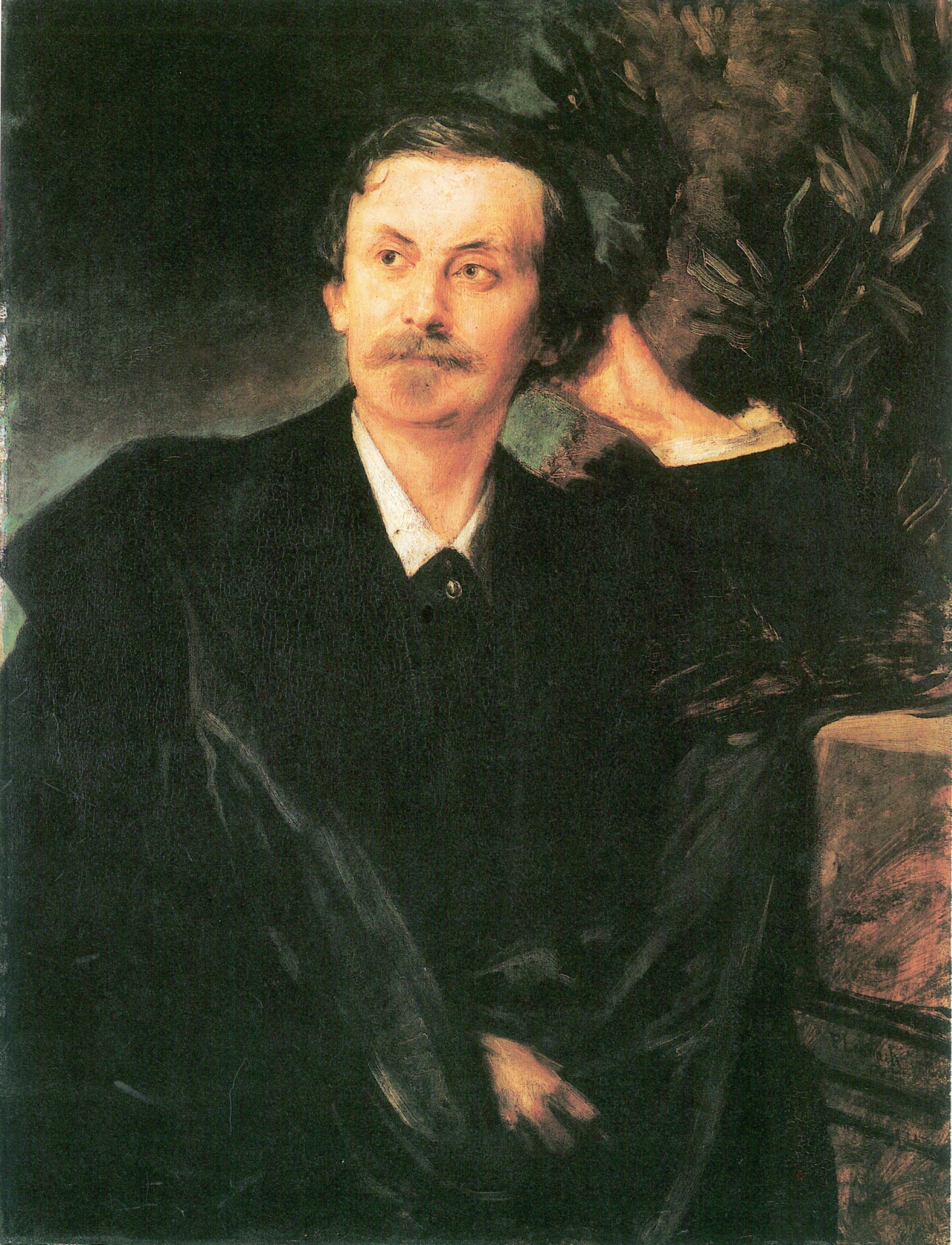
Adolf Friedrich von Schack, the author of the lyrics, portrait by Lenbach

Schack was a wealthy aristocrat who was a poet, linguist, diplomat and art collector. He was born in Mecklenburg and lived in Munich from 1855 onward. His translations of Persian poems were among his outstanding contributions. Strauss set ten poems by Schack, the six in the Opus 17 collection, following on from four in his earlier Opus 15 songs (which included Winternacht).

In 1972 Norman Del Mar wrote:

With "Ständchen" we come face to face with the most popular of all Strauss' songs. So often has it been heard in its orchestral form that it is easy to forget that the instrumentation is not by Strauss at all, but Felix Mottl. Other arrangements for piano solo and duett, salon orchestra etc quickly followed, and the song could well claim to have made Strauss's name into a household word single handed. That it is a masterpiece there can be little doubt.

The song's featherweight accompaniment combined with a light and beautifully shaped melody sets the song apart, and "the surges of lyricism both in the refrain and the climax...are the essence of that glowing ecstasy which is the peculiar quality of Strauss' art at its best". Whilst in more recent years the song's popularity has been overtaken by others, notably "Morgen!" and the Four Last Songs, the song remains a standard part of recorded collections of Strauss songs.

Strauss accompanied the tenor Heinrich Zeller for the first public concert performance at Weimar on 28 October 1889. He wrote to his parents that the song was repeated by popular demand. Strauss recorded the piece twice: in 1941 conducting the orchestral version with the tenor Julius Patzak and the Bavarian State Orchestra and in 1942 for a radio broadcast from Vienna on the piano with Finnish soprano Lea Piltti.

The poem "Ständchen" has also been set by several other composers, including a version by Pfitzner.

== Lyrics ==
Schack's poem comes from his 1866 collection Liebesgedichte und Lieder (Love poems and songs). Strauss slightly altered the words to the second verse (the original second line has "die über die Blumen hüpfen").

Ständchen

Mach auf, mach auf, doch leise mein Kind,
Um keinen vom Schlummer zu wecken.
Kaum murmelt der Bach, kaum zittert im Wind
Ein Blatt an den Büschen und Hecken.
Drum leise, mein Mädchen, daß nichts sich regt,
Nur leise die Hand auf die Klinke gelegt.

Mit Tritten, wie Tritte der Elfen so sacht,
Um über die Blumen zu hüpfen,
Flieg leicht hinaus in die Mondscheinnacht,
Zu mir in den Garten zu schlüpfen.
Rings schlummern die Blüten am rieselnden Bach
Und duften im Schlaf, nur die Liebe ist wach.

Sitz nieder, hier dämmert's geheimnisvoll
Unter den Lindenbäumen,
Die Nachtigall uns zu Häupten soll
Von unseren Küssen träumen,
Und die Rose, wenn sie am Morgen erwacht,
Hoch glühn von den Wonnenschauern der Nacht.

Serenade

Come out, come out, step lightly my love,
Lest envious sleepers awaken,
So still is the air, no leaf on the boughs above
From its slumber is shaken.
Then lightly, dear maiden, that none may catch,
The tap of thy shoe, or the clink of the latch.

On top toe, on tip toe as moon spirits might
Wondering over the flowers
Come softly down, through the radiant night
To me in the rose hidden bowers
The lilies are dreaming around the dim lake
In odorous sleep, only love is awake.

Come nearer, Ah, see how the moonbeams fall,
Through the willow's drooping tresses
The nightingales in the branches
all shall dream of our caresses
And the roses waking with morning light,
Flush red, flush red, with the rapture born of the night.

The 1912 Paul England translation is a "singable translation" which is compatible with the vocal line Strauss wrote for the German.

== Music ==
The music follows the text from a soft beginning with shimmering piano accompaniment to the ecstatic climax on "hoch glühn", when the rose is expected to glow from the "night's rapture". Roger Vignoles, the pianist for a recording of the complete songs by Strauss sung by tenor Andrew Kennedy, wrote in the liner notes about the complexity of rhythm in the treatment of longer syllables in the text, and in the climax which "thrillingly mixes short and long phrases, quick and slow, in the interplay between voice and piano".

== Orchestral version ==
In 1895 the Austrian conductor Felix Mottl (1856–1911) wrote an orchestral version of the song, which was not finally published until 1912. The instrumentation consists of:

- Three flutes, two oboes, two clarinets, two bassoons
- Four french horns, one trumpet, three trombones
- Timpani
- Two harps
- Strings

Strauss himself conducted the Mottl orchestral version, and indeed recorded it in 1941.
