= Op. 56 =

In music, Op. 56 stands for Opus number 56. Compositions that are assigned this number include:

- Beethoven – Triple Concerto
- Brahms – Variations on a Theme by Haydn
- Chopin – Mazurkas, Op. 56
- Fauré – Dolly
- Goltzius – Frühlingsfeier
- Mendelssohn – Symphony No. 3
- Prokofiev – Sonata for Two Violins
- Schumann – Studies in the Form of Canons for Organ or Pedal Piano (Etuden in kanonischer Form für Orgel oder Pedalklavier)
- Sibelius – String Quartet in D minor, Voces intimae (1909)
- Tchaikovsky – Concert Fantasia
