= Schlagobers =

1921-22 ballet by Richard Strauss

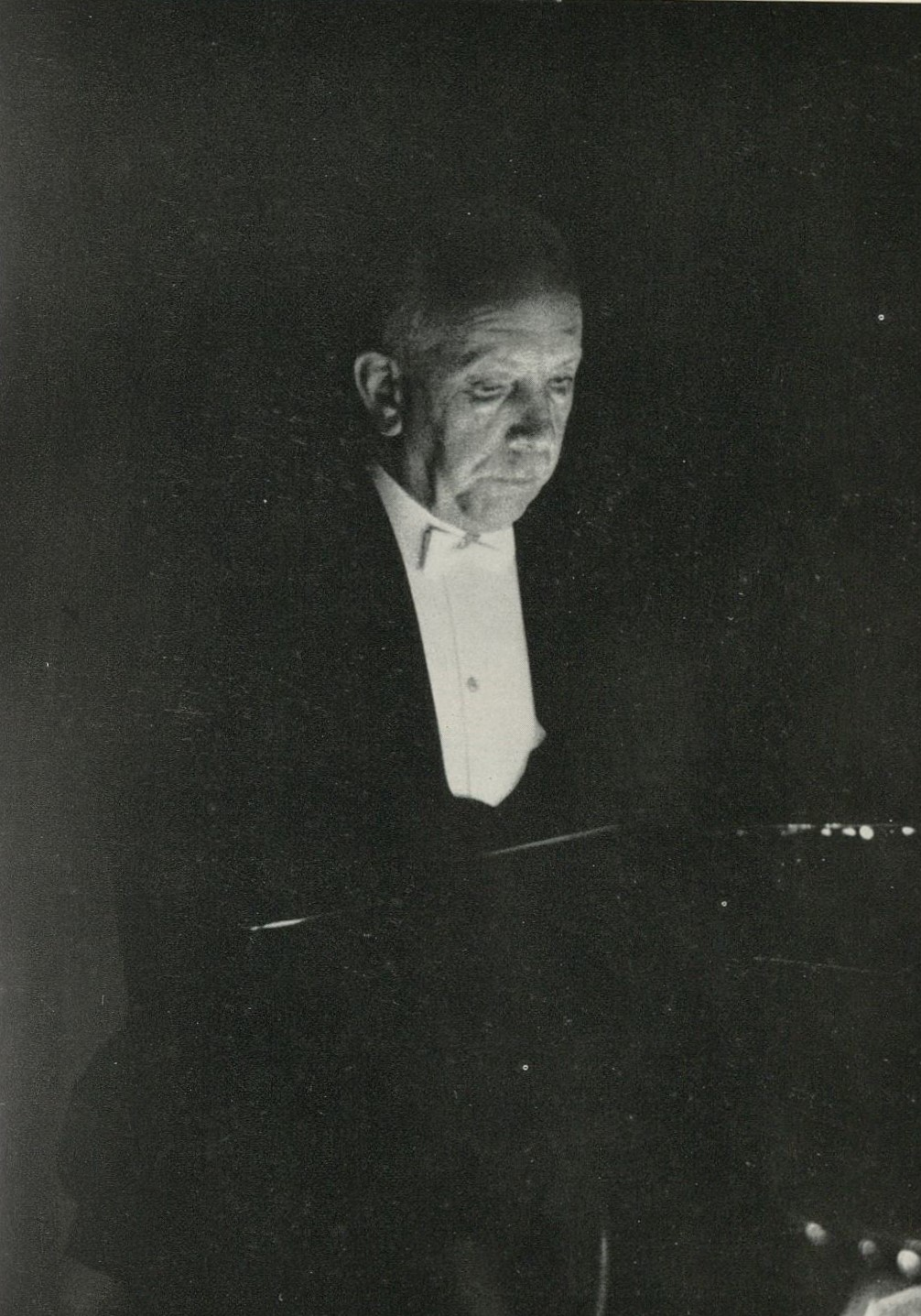
Richard Strauss conducting Schlagobers, photo by Erich Salomon

Schlagobers (Whipped Cream), Op. 70, is a ballet in two acts with a libretto and score by Richard Strauss. Composed in 1921–22, it was given its première at the Vienna State Opera on 9 May 1924.

== Background ==
While serving as co-director of the Vienna State Opera with Franz Schalk from 1919 until 1924, Strauss sought to revive the fortunes of the resident ballet company, struggling after the collapse of the Austro-Hungarian monarchy. He recruited choreographer Heinrich Kröller (1880–1930) from the Berlin State Opera and collaborated with him on a series of productions, restaging his earlier work for the Ballets Russes Josephslegende (1922), and rearranging the music of Schumann, François Couperin, Beethoven, and Gluck for, respectively, Karneval (1922), Ballettsoirée (1923), Die Ruinen von Athen (1924), and Don Juan (1924). Most ambitious was Schlagobers, premiered during the official celebrations for the composer's sixtieth birthday.

== Scenario ==
A group of children celebrate their confirmation in a Konditorei (a Viennese cake shop), where many of the confections come alive, with marzipan marches and chocolate dances. Having overindulged, one boy falls ill and hallucinates, leading to the party of Princess Pralinée, a trio of amorous liqueurs, and a riot of cakes pacified by beer.

The scenario is somewhat reminiscent of The Nutcracker, which remained unperformed in the West until 1929.

== Music ==
Strauss' score employs a thematic-developmental treatment of motifs and was, according to contemporary critic Julius Korngold, "too elaborately artistic, too massive and heavily developed, and not dancerly enough... The light whipped cream is whisked in a gaudy bowl."

== Musical scenes ==
Act I

1. Einleitung
2. Die Firmlinge betreten die Konditorei
3. Landler
4. Marsch
5. Tanz der Teeblüte
6. Tanz des Kaffee's
7. Träumerei
8. Tanz des Kakao
9. Aufritt und Tanz des Zuckers
10. Reigen von Zucker, Kaffee und Kakao
11. Schlagoberswalzer

Act II

1. Die Krankenstube
2. Eintritt des Arztes
3. Einzug der Prinzessin Pralinee mit ihrem Hofstaat
4. Die Prinzessin
5. Tanz der Kleinen Pralinees (Kinder)
6. Springtanz der Knallbonbons
7. Galopp
8. Zwischenspiel
9. Menuett der Mademoiselle Marianne
10. Pas de deux
11. Das Chaos
12. Aufruhrpolka
13. Donner
14. Vollbierreigen der Besänftigten
15. Finale
16. Langsamer Waltzer

== Premiere ==
Kröller's choreography may be partially reconstructed from surviving drawings and dance notation, while sketches of many of the 287 costumes and sets created by the house designers have survived. The extravagance of the production, costing some four billion Kronen – a contemporary new staging of Wagner's Rienzi cost by contrast only two hundred million – led to it being dubbed the Milliardenballett or "billionaire's ballet", and at a time of food-shortages and hyperinflation, may in part explain its troubled reception. Strauss observed, in response to the poor reviews, "I cannot bear the tragedy of the present time. I want to create joy."

== Political subtext ==
While in the final version the three amorous liquors are Marianne Chartreuse, Ladislaw Slivovitz, and Boris Wutki, representatives of France, Poland and Russia, the original intent was to have the German Michel Schnapps instead winning Marianne's hand, a symbol of political reconciliation or even resurgent German virility, written out after the Occupation of the Ruhr. Also in earlier sketches, red banners were waved amidst the riotous proletarian cakes, with the Revolution Polka conducted by matzos.

== Recordings ==
There is a recording of the full ballet by the Tokyo Metropolitan Symphony Orchestra, conducted by Hiroshi Wakasugi.

The composer also recorded the waltzes from the ballet with the Vienna Philharmonic.

== Other productions ==
The American Ballet Theatre mounted their first production of the ballet in 2017 at the Metropolitan Opera in New York City; Alexei Ratmansky provided the choreography and Mark Ryden designed set and costumes. That production was also shown at the Kennedy Center in Washington, DC, and at the Hong Kong Arts Festival.

== See also ==
- List of compositions by Richard Strauss
- Viennese coffee house
