= Wiener Philharmoniker Fanfare =

Brass fanfare by Richard Strauss

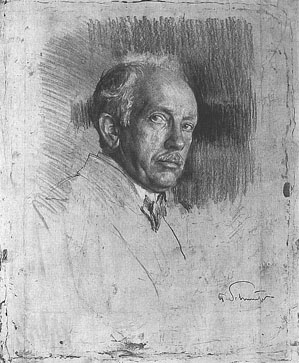
Schmutzer's engraved portrait of Richard Strauss, 1922

The Wiener Philharmoniker Fanfare Op. AV 109, also known as Vienna Philharmonic Fanfare, is a fanfare for brass instruments written by Richard Strauss.

The fanfare was written for the Vienna Philharmonic orchestra to be performed at a ball to mark their 40th anniversary on 4 March 1924. It was the first benefit ball that had been held for the orchestra and was intended to raise money for the orchestra's pension fund. It was played as honoured guests arrived at the ball. The original manuscript of the piece is in the archives of the Vienna Philharmonic. It was dedicated by Strauss to the orchestra. The piece is opus number AV 109 in Trenner and Ott's catalogue of Strauss's works.

The piece was arranged by Hans Heinz Scholtys for the Trompeterchor der Stadt Wien for 10 trumpets, 6 trombones, 2 tubas and 3 timpani.

It was played at the Coronation of Charles III and Camilla in May 2023 immediately after Charles's crowning.

The musicologist Barbara Heninger described the piece as demonstrating Strauss's "affinity for striking brass textures" and "short but stirring".
