= Violin Sonata (Strauss) =

Musical composition by Richard Strauss

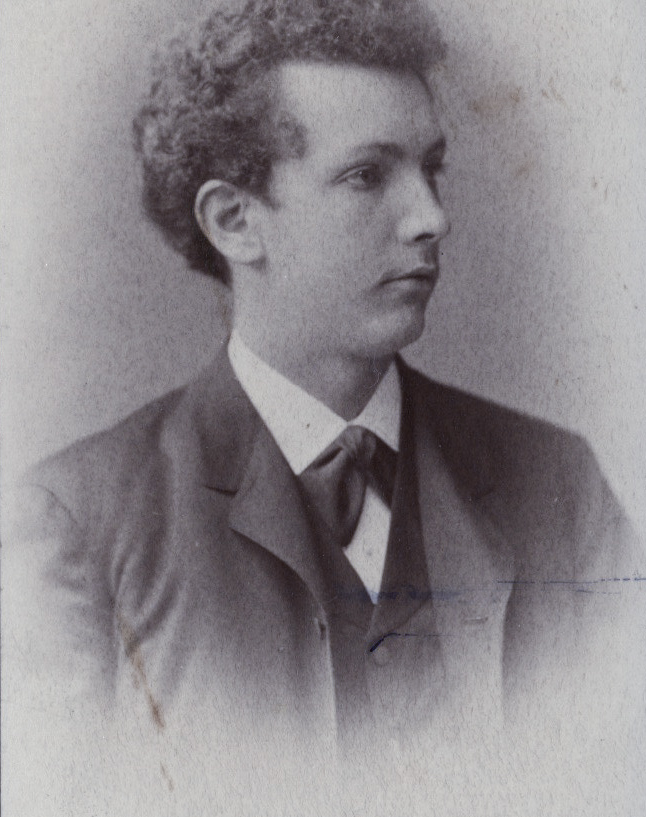
Richard Strauss in 1886

The Violin Sonata in E♭ major, Op. 18 was written by Richard Strauss in 1887 and published in 1888. Although not considered a milestone in violin literature, it is frequently performed and recorded. It is noted for its lyrical beauty and its technical demands made on both violinist and pianist.

Following the completion of his Cello Sonata and Piano Sonata, Strauss composed his Violin Sonata in 1887. It was during this time that Strauss fell in love with Pauline de Ahna, the soprano whom he would later wed, and his amorous feelings can be heard throughout the piece.

== Structure ==
Like all of his chamber music, Strauss' sonata follows standard classical form, though it is considered the last of his works to do so. The piece is in three movements and takes approximately thirty minutes to perform:

1. Allegro, ma non troppo
2. Improvisation: Andante cantabile
3. Finale: Andante – Allegro

The first movement opens with a brief piano solo, followed by lyrical violin interludes, through which the thematic material is presented. This movement follows typical sonata-allegro form, and although it begins in a melancholy tone, the movement ends jubilantly.

The second movement is unique in that it is an Improvisation; that is, the tranquil violin passages give the impression of improvisational material. This movement maintains a beautiful singing tone throughout, and ends meditatively. It is in ternary form.

The third and final movement begins with a slow, meditative piano introduction which then leads into an exuberant Allegro. After a rush of virtuosic passages from both performers, the sonata comes to an explosive end.

== Notable recordings ==
The earliest recording of the sonata was by Jascha Heifetz with pianist Arpad Sandor for RCA in 1934 (he went on to record it twice more, in 1954 and 1972, and performed it in his "final recital" with pianist Brooks Smith).

- Jascha Heifetz and Brooks Smith, released by RCA Victor.
- Ginette Neveu and Gustav Beck, released by EMI Records.
- Gidon Kremer and Oleg Maisenberg, released by Deutsche Grammophon.
- Anne Akiko Meyers and Rohan de Silva, released by RCA Corporation.
- Sarah Chang and Wolfgang Sawallisch, released by EMI Records.
- Vadim Repin and Nikolai Lugansky, released by Erato Records.
- Kyung-Wha Chung and Krystian Zimerman, released by Deutsche Grammophon.
- Itzhak Perlman and Emanuel Ax, released by Deutsche Grammophon.

== See also ==
- List of compositions by Richard Strauss
