= Ernst Kraus =

German opera singer (1863–1941)

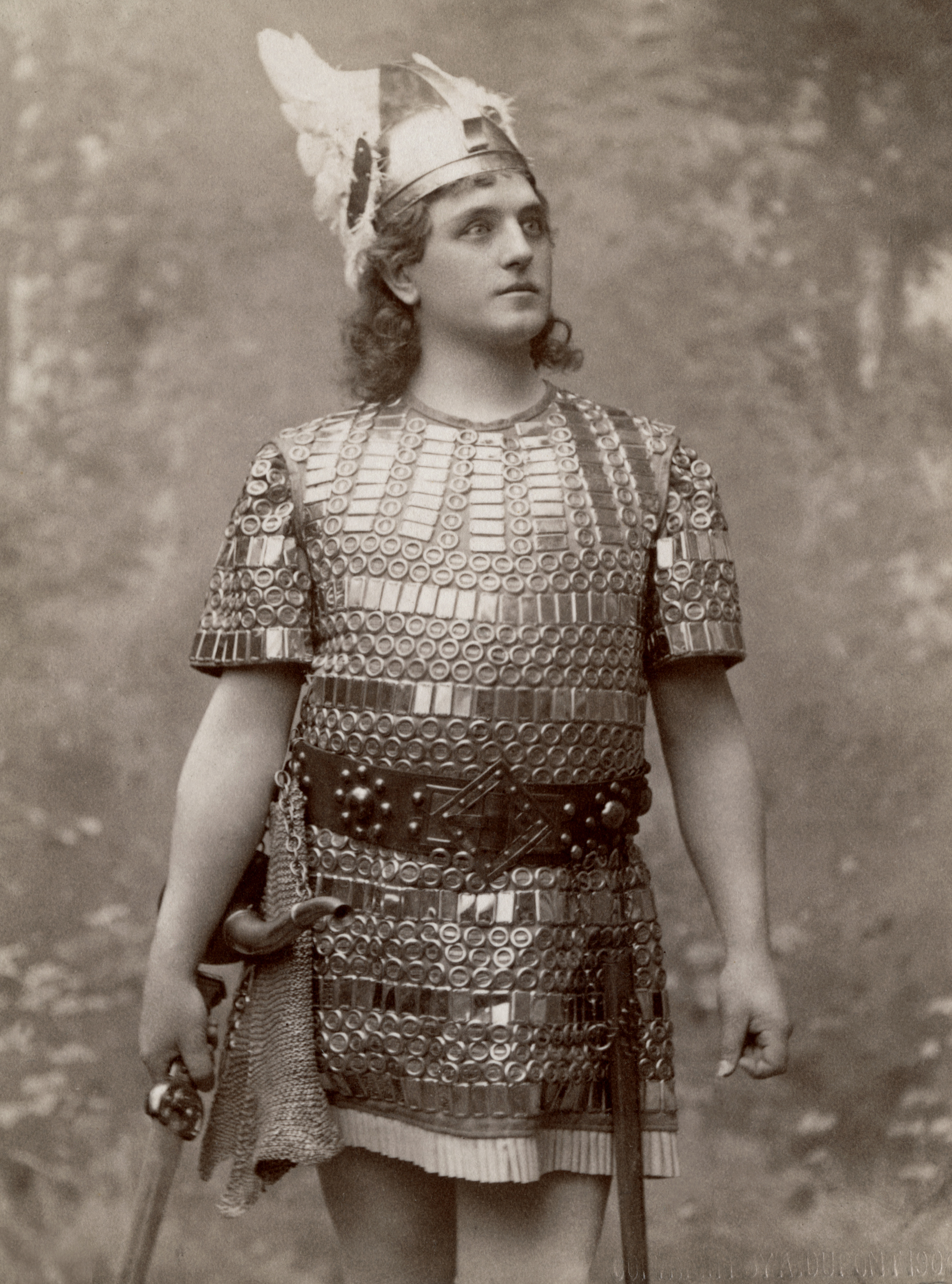
Ernst Kraus as Siegfried in Wagner's Götterdämmerung (1904)

Ernst Kraus (June 8, 1863 – September 5, 1941) was a German dramatic tenor best known for his performances in the operas of Richard Wagner. He decided to embark on an operatic career when he heard leading singers performing in Nuremberg. He studied voice first in Milan with Cesare Galliera and then in Munich with Anna Schimon-Regan.

Kraus debuted in Mannheim as Tamino in Die Zauberflöte on March 26, 1893. He first came to the United States in 1894, where he was engaged as principal tenor of the Damrosch Opera Company; he returned in 1895. He was appointed the leading tenor of the Berlin Staatsoper in 1896, holding that position for 27 continuous years. During this period, he distinguished himself in the German repertory. In 1901, he appeared at the Bayreuth Festival as Siegmund in Die Walküre, the role in which he made his New York Metropolitan Opera debut on November 25, 1903.

He retired from opera in 1924 in order to teach, and died in Wörthsee, Germany, in 1941. His voice was noted in his prime for its exceptional power and solidity rather than for its beauty or suavity of phrasing. It is preserved in several cylinders recorded for Thomas Edison's German branch between 1905 and 1910, among them "Am Stillen Herd" from Die Meistersinger (no. 15194) and "Liebeslied" from Die Walkure (no. 15256), as well as a number of acoustically recorded discs made prior to World War I.
