= Winternacht =

Lied by German composer Richard Strauss

- Lied by Richard Strauss
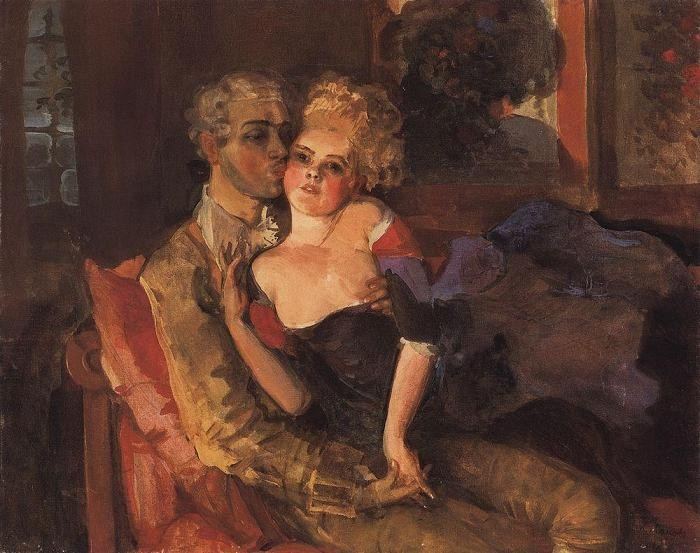
- Lovers in the Evening by Konstantin Somov (1910)
- English: Winter night
- Catalogue: TrV 148
- Opus: 15/2
- Text: Poem by Adolf Friedrich von Schack
- Language: German
- Composed: 27 November 1886
- Scoring: Voice and piano

"Winternacht" (Winter night) is an art song for voice and piano composed by Richard Strauss in 1886, setting a poem of the same title by the German poet Adolf Friedrich von Schack (1815–1894). The song is part of his collection Five songs for middle voice and piano, Op. 15, TrV 148.

== Composition history ==
Strauss set 4 songs by Adolf von Schack in his opus 15 songs. Von Schack, who was still alive in 1886, was a notable member of the Munich cultural elite, a member of the academy of sciences, notable art collector and prime mover in Bavarian literary life. Strauss starts the poem "with rain and roaring wind," writes Alan Jefferson.

It will be seen that the rain and roaring wind are not the real content of this poem, for in spite of the storm raging outside the singer and his lady turn it into an indoor spring with their lovemaking. Strauss points this when he comes out of G minor, D minor and B-flat minor into the tranquil G major passage. Though in reminding us what is still going on outside, the song ends with the first motif, with the penultimate chord (C minor with added 6th) avoiding the conventional G minor close by going into G major instead.

== Lyrics ==
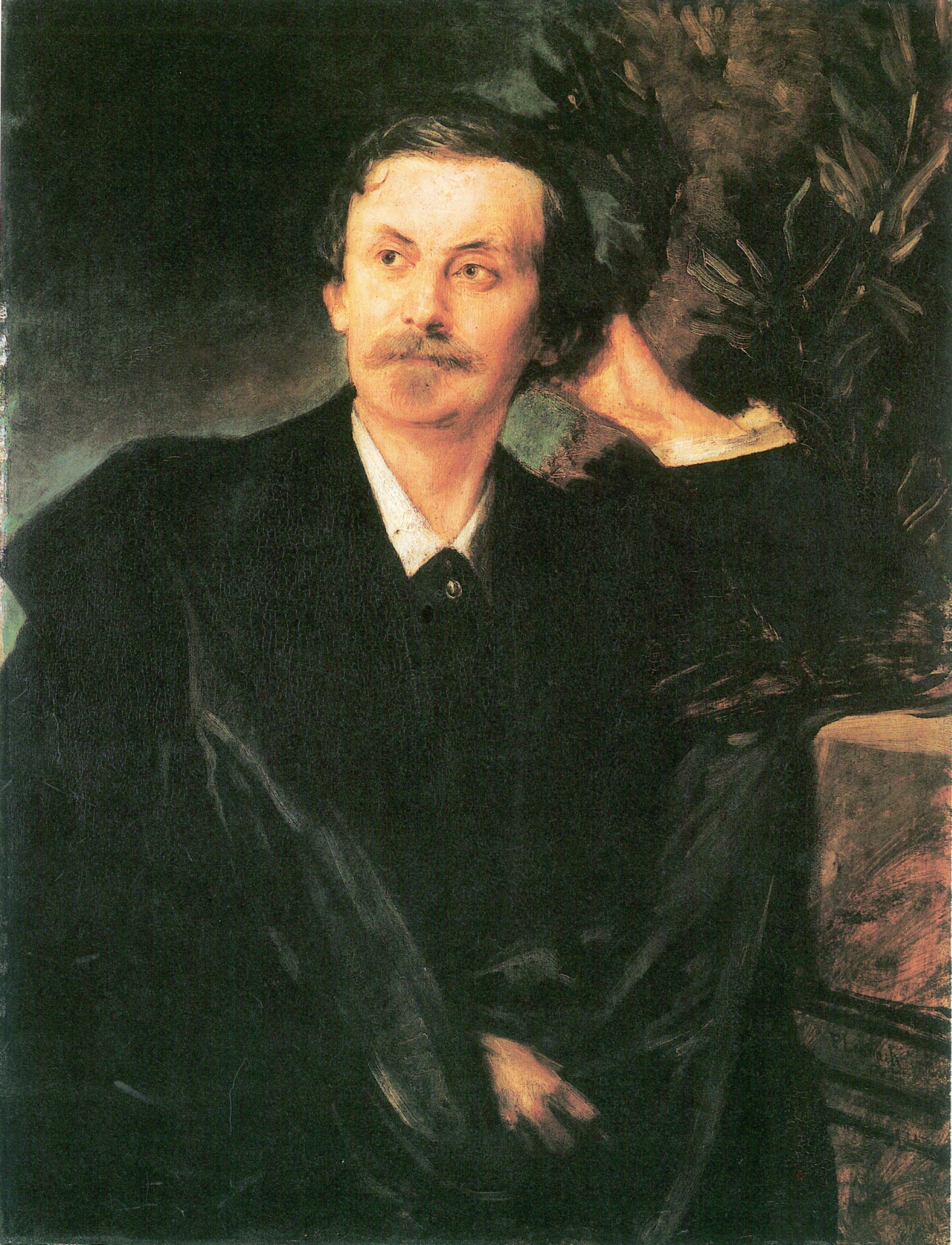
Adolf Friedrich von Schack, the author of the lyrics, portrait by Von Lenbach

Winter Nacht

Mit Regen und Sturmgebrause
Sei mir willkommen, Dezembermond,
Und führ mich den Weg zum traulichen Hause,
Wo meine geliebte Herrin wohnt.

Nie hab' ich die Blüte des Maien,
Den blauenden Himmel, den blitzenden Tau
So fröhlich gegrüßt wie heute dein Schneien,
Dein Nebelgebräu und Wolkengrau.

Denn durch das Flockengetriebe,
Schöner, als je der Lenz gelacht,
Leuchtet und blüht der Frühling der Liebe
Mir heimlich nun in der Winternacht.

Winters' Night

With all your rain and stormy booming,
I bid you welcome, December moon,
And lead me on my way to the snug little house
Where my beloved lady lives.

Never have I greeted so happily the blossoms of May,
The blue sky, and the sparkling dew,
As I great your snows today -
Your foggy brew and cloudy grayness.

For through the driving flakes of snow,
Fairer than any Spring ever smiled,
A Spring of Love gleams and blossoms
Secretly for me now in this winter's night.

== Commentary ==
Rufus Hallmark in German Lieder in the Nineteenth Century describes the song as 'rarely performed' and comments that it "offers examples of the Straussian word painting found in many of his lieder...the recurrent piano motive...dramatically anticipates [the] tumult of the storm...a subtle unifying idea in the vocal line is the simple stepwise quarter-note descent. The first two stanzas in G minor give way to G major and a more lyrical, calmer portrayal of drifting snowflakes and thoughts of love and springtime." Critic Charles Osborne has described it as "disappointingly pedestrian." However, the song may be experiencing a revival: two recent collections of Strauss songs, one from 2014 by American bass baritone Thomas Hampson and one from 2015 by German soprano Katharina Persicke have included the song in their selection.
