= Notturno (Strauss) =

Orchestral song by Richard Strauss

- Lied by Richard Strauss
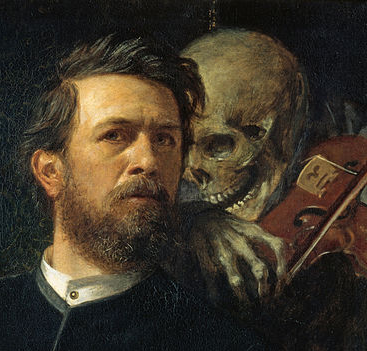
- Self-portrait with Death as a Fiddler Arnold Böcklin.
- English: Nocturne
- Catalogue: TrV 197
- Opus: 44 (1)
- Text: Poem by Richard Dehmel
- Language: German
- Composed: 1899
- Dedication: Anton von Rooy
- Scoring: Voice and orchestra.

"Notturno" (translated as Nocturne), Opus 44, Number 1 (TrV 197), is an orchestral song written for low voice, which Richard Strauss composed in 1899 based on a poem Erscheinung (translated as Apparition) by the German poet Richard Dehmel (1863-1920). In performance it takes about 13 minutes. Norman Del Mar described it as “ranking amongst Strauss’s finest as well as more ambitious works”.

== Composition history ==
Strauss wrote two “large songs for low voice and orchestral accompaniment” (German Zwei Grosse Gesänge für tiefe Stimme mit Orchesterbegleitung): Notturno being the first and Nächtlicher Gang the second. Strauss described his two songs in correspondence with his father Franz Strauss as “Baritone songs”. The song was dedicated to the Dutch baritone Anton von Rooy. It was premiered on December 3, 1900, in Berlin, with the composer conducting the Berlin Royal Court Opera with baritone Baptist Hoffmann.

The orchestration is for strings and wind, with no percussion and “just three trombones for their sombre quality”. Strauss, had only recently taken up his duties as chief conductor of the Berlin Royal Court Opera (where he served from 1898 to 1908), finishing the composition of the song at his home in Charlottenburg on 11 July 1899 and the full scoring two months later on 16 September. Otto Singer Jr. made a reduction for piano, violin and voice in the same year.

Strauss set 11 poems by the German poet Richard Dehmel over the period 1895–1901. Dehmel was a controversial figure in the Germany of Kaiser Wilhelm II, a socialist who had been convicted for blasphemy in Berlin during 1897. He was the same age as Strauss, and “Dehmel worked squarely within the aesthetic territory occupied by Strauss”. Whilst Strauss had little interest in the politics of Dehmel, he shared the Nietzschean perspective that human lives are lived among and controlled by physical forces. Whilst the two had corresponded for several years, they first met on March 23, 1899 (Hugo von Hofmannsthal was accompanying Dehmel, and also met Strauss for the first time).

Dehmel's poem Erscheinung (Apparition) was published in his 1891 collection Erlösungen (Deliverance or Salvation), and in a letter to Strauss Dehmel described it as a “Romance apparition”. Dehmel's poem “tells the tale of the vision in a dream where Death appears in the shape of a much loved friend who appears in bright moonshine at deepest night playing a supplicating air on his violin”. Strauss adapted the poem and renamed in Notturno. In particular, in Dehmel's poem the “apparition” is a dream and ends with a thankful awakening. Strauss omitted the first stanza and the last line of the poem, so that the apparition stands on its own. As Del Mar commented, “if the omissions render the meaning of the verses as a whole more obscure, they add to the mystic quality”. Dehmel himself found the setting much to his liking: “Of Strauss’s compositions on texts of my songs, I like best Lied an meinem Sohn and Nottorno…” In fact Dehmel later revised Erscheinung and introduced some of the changes made by Strauss - including the title Notturno. In the posthumous collection of his poems edited by his second wife (Ida Dehmel), the first verse and last line are also left out rendering it almost the same as the Strauss lyrics.

== Lyrics ==
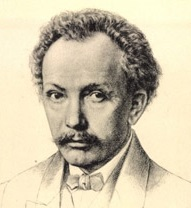
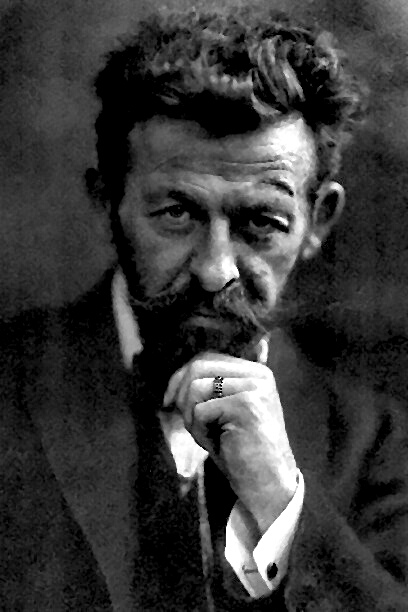
Richard Strauss (1900) and Richard Dehmel (1905).

The lyrics of the song follow quite closely the 1891 version of Dehmel's poem Erscheinung. The major difference is in the omission of the first stanza, and the last line when the narrator awakes up from the dream "und seufzend bin ich aufgewach" (and sighing I awoke). There are also some minor changes of adjectives and word orderings. This is the version as in the score.

Notturno

Hoch hing der Mond; das Schneegefild
lag weit und öde um mich her,
wie meine Seele bleich und leer.
Und neben mir – so stumm und wild,
so stumm und kalt wie meine Not,
als wollt' er weichen nimmermehr,
saß starr – und wartete – der Tod.

Da kam es her, wie einst so mild,
so bang und sacht,
aus ferner Nacht;
so kummerschwer
kam seiner Geige Hauch daher,
und vor mir stand sein stilles Bild.

Der mich umflochten wie ein Band,
daß meine Blüte nicht zerfiel
und daß mein Herz die Sehnsucht fand,
die große Sehnsucht ohne Ziel:
dar stand er nun in öden land,
und stand so trüb und feierlich,
und sah nicht auf, noch grüßte mich, –
nur seine Töne ließ er irr'n
und weinen durch die kühle Flur,
und mir entgegen schaute nur
auf seiner Stirn,
als wär’s ein Auge hohl und fahl,
der tiefen Wunde dunkles Mal.

Und trüber quoll das trübe Lied,
und quoll so heiß, und wuchs und schwoll,
so heiß und voll
wie Leben, das nach Liebe glüht, –
wie Liebe, die nach Leben schreit,
nach ungenoßner Seligkeit,

so wehevoll,
so wühlend quoll
das strömende Lied und flutete, –
und leise leise blutete
und strömte mit
ins bleiche schneefeld, rot und fahl,
der tiefen Wunde dunkles Mal.

Und müder glitt die müde Hand,
und vor mir stand
ein bleicher Tag,
ein ferner bleicher Jugendtag,
da Starr im Sand
zerfallen seine Blüte lag,
da seine Sehnsucht sich vergaß
in ihrer Schwermut Uebermaß
und seiner Traurigkeiten müd
zum Ziel Er schritt, –
und liet auf schrie das wienende Lied,
das wühlende, und flutete,
und seiner Saiten Klage schnitt
und seine Stirme blutete
und weinte mit
in meiner starre Seelennot,
als sollt' ich hören ein Gebot,
als sollt' ich fühlen, was ich litt,
und fühlen alles Leidens Schuld
und alles Lebens warme Huld, –
und also, blutend, wandt' er sich
ins bleiche Dunkel – und verblich.

Und bebend hört' ich mir entgehn,
entfliehn das Lied, und wie so zart
so zitternd ward
der langen Töne fernes Flehn, –
da fühlte ich kalt ein Rauschen wehn
und grauenschwer
die Luft sich rühren um mich her,
und wollte bebend doch ihn sehn,
sein Lauschen sehn,
Der wartend saß bei meiner Not,
und wandte mich, – da lag es kahl.
das bleiche Feld: und still und fahl
zog fern vondannen – auch der Tod.

Hoch hing der Mond; und mild und müd
hinschwand es in die leere Nacht,
das flehende Lied, –
und schwand und schied,
des toten Freundes flehendes Lied.

Nocturne

The moon hung high; the snowfield
Lay pale and dreary all around us,
Like my soul pale and empty,
For next to me, so silent and savage,
As silent and cold as my distress,
As if he would never leave,
Stiffly - waiting - sat Death.

Again it came, still so mild,
So weary and gentle
In the distance of night.
So full of grief,
The sound of his violin came nearer,
And before me stood his silent image.

He who entwined me like a ribbon
So that my youth did not fall apart,
And that my heart might find the desire,
The great aimless longing.
So now he stands on the barren land,
And stands so sad and solemn,
And neither looks up nor greets me,
Just letting his music float around
Crying through the cold fields;
And only staring at me
From his brow,
Like a pale and hollow eye,
The dark mark of a deep wound.

Gloomily swelled the gloomy song,
Growing hotter, gushing, swelling,
As hot and full
As life that burns for love,
As love that cries for life,
And for unattained bliss,

So woefull,
Swelling up
The flowing song flooded;
And quietly, quietly bled
and flowing together
Into the bleak snowfield, red and pale,
The dark mark of a deep wound.

And tired slid the tired hand,
And before me stood
A bleak day,
A distant, bleak day of youth,
When rigid in the sand
His withered bloom lay,
With his desire lost.
In his great melancholy
And his tired sadness,
He strode toward the goal -
Loudly wailed the weeping song,
Aching and flowing,
And the lament of his strings cut,
And his brow bled
Weeping with my souls distress,
As if I should hear a commandment,
As if I should rejoice in my suffering,
As if he wanted to feel my suffering
Feel together all the guilt of all suffering
And all the warm grace of life -
And weeping, bleeding he turned away
Into the bleak darkness and faded away.

And with trembling I heard his song
Receding and escaping from me.
And how tender, trembling
The distant pleading of the long tones,
I felt a cold breeze rustling
And laden with dread
I felt an ominous quiet in the air,
And trembling, I wanted now to see him,
To see him listening,
He, who waited and sat with my misery,
And I turned -- there lay empty
The bleak field, silent and pale
Death too vanished into the darkness.

The moon hung high; gentle and tired
Into the empty night,
Vanished the pleading song,
And vanished, gone -
Was my dead friend’s pleading song.

== External sources ==
- Paul Thomas: Richard Strauss — Notturno, Opus 44, No.1
