= Frühlingsfeier =

- Lied by Richard Strauss
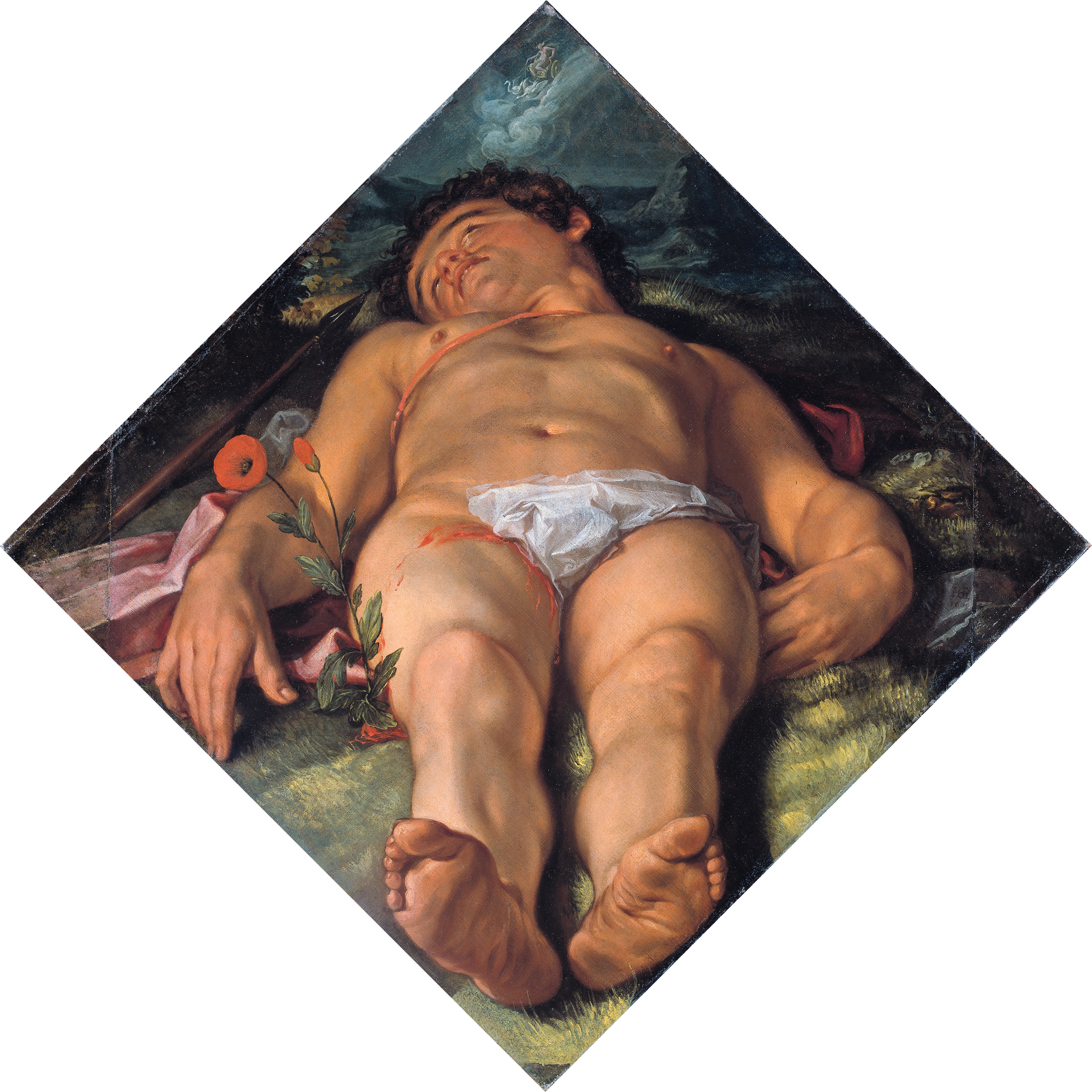
- The blood of the dead Adonis turns into an anemone (Ovid, Met. X 735) (1609), by Hendrick Goltzius
- English: Rite of Spring
- Catalogue: TrV 220
- Opus: 56, No. 5
- Text: Heinrich Heine
- Language: German
- Composed: September 22, 1906
- Dedication: Composer's Mother, Josephine
- Scoring: Voice and piano

"Frühlingsfeier" (English: "Spring Festival" or "Rite of Spring") is a song composed by Richard Strauss using the text of a poem with the same name by Heinrich Heine (1797–1856), the fifth in his Opus 56 collection, (TrV 220) which was published in 1906. Originally written for piano and voice, Strauss wrote an orchestral version in 1933.

== Composition History ==
Strauss set three of Heine's poems in his six Opus 56 songs, the poem Frühlingsfeier being from Heine's collection Romanzen (1839–42).

Startling and vivid, it depicts one of the wildest and most colorful of Spring rituals, the festival of Adonis...In addition to being the ideal of manly beauty, Adonis was the God of vegetation whose death and return to life represent decay in winter and its revival in Spring.

Jefferson believes that "This is the most uninhibited of Strauss's lieder so far as the words go, and certainly he matched these words to perfection in his later orchestral setting" The orchestral version was written for Viorica Ursuleac in 1933. With this song "he had reached his ultimate formula in transparent coloring of a big song supported by big orchestral forces" and "..it is a virtuoso song in every respect, and given the right kind of agony in its interpretation, the final six repetitions of "Adonis!" can wring the heart". Del Mar also believes that the song "...remains in its orchestral version one of the most passionately colorful of Strauss's Lieder".

== Lyrics ==
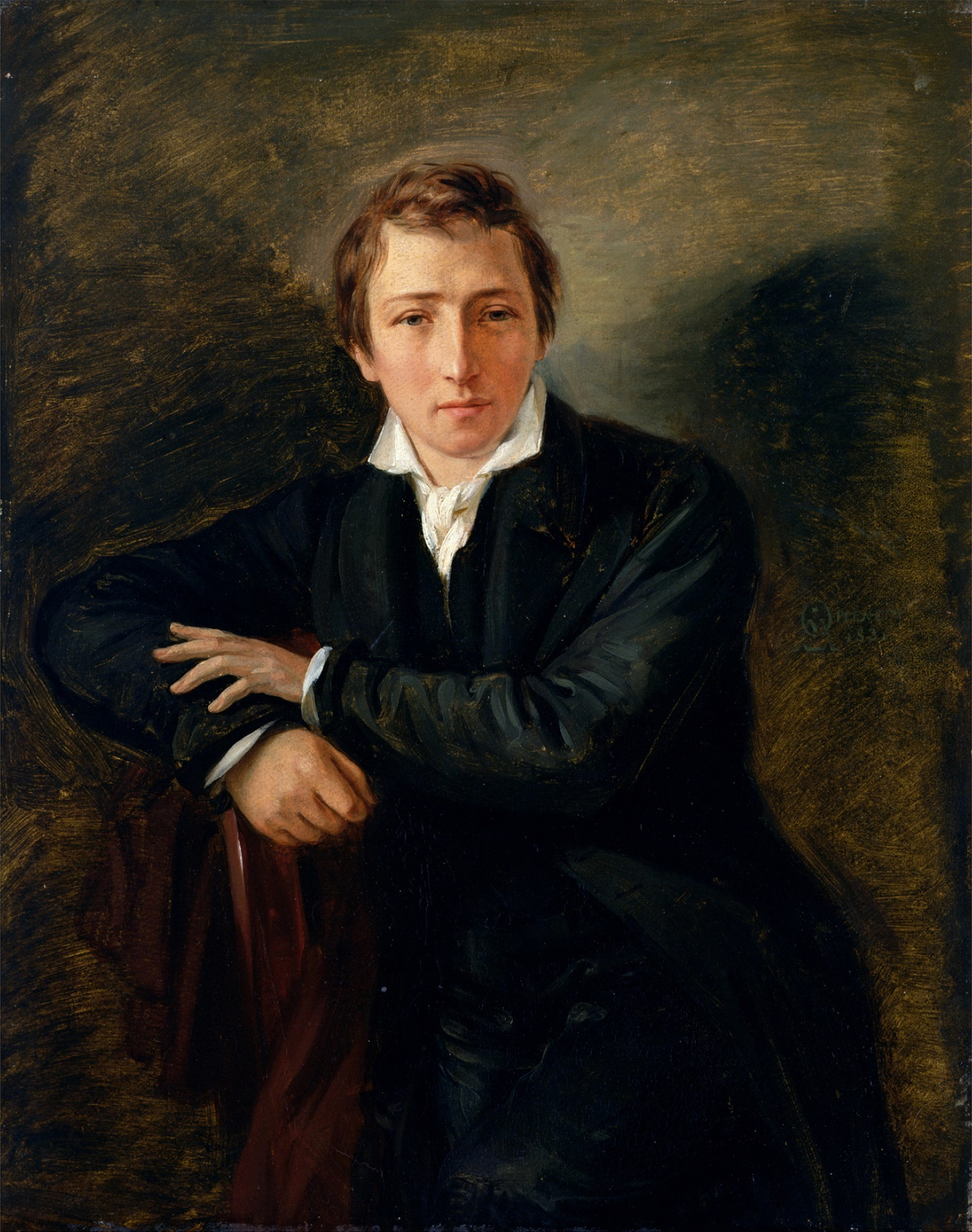
A painting of Heine by Moritz Daniel Oppenheim

"The poem expresses the ecstacy of the Spring festival of Adonis: its title could be translated as...Rite of Spring, and Heine's poem expresses the cyclic ritual death motif. Frühlingsfeier is a paen of pagan worship from Strauss's beloved Greece". Strauss added four repetitions of the name "Adonis" to the last verse.

Frühlingsfeier

Das ist des Frühlings traurige Lust!
Die blühenden Mädchen, die wilde Schar,
Sie stürmen dahin mit flatterndem Haar
Und Jammergeheul und entblößter Brust:
"Adonis! Adonis!"

Es sinkt die Nacht. Bei Fackelschein
Sie suchen hin und her im Wald,
Der angstverwirret widerhallt
Vom Weinen und Lachen und Schluchzen und Schreien:
"Adonis! Adonis!"

Das wunderschöne Jünglingsbild,
Es liegt am Boden blaß und tot,
Das Blut färbt alle Blumen rot,
Und Klagelaut die Luft erfüllt:
"Adonis! Adonis!"

Rite of Spring

This is the spring-tide's mournful feast;
The frantic troops of blooming girls
Are rushing hither with flying curls,
Mourning they smite their bare white breast,
Adonis! Adonis!

The night has come. By the torches' gleams
They search the forest on every side,
That echoes with anguish far and wide,
With tears, mad laughter, and sobs and screams,
Adonis! Adonis!

The mortal youth so strangely fair,
Lies on the cold turf pale and dead;
His heart's blood staineth the flowers red,
And a wild lament fulfills the air,
Adonis! Adonis!

== Orchestral arrangement ==
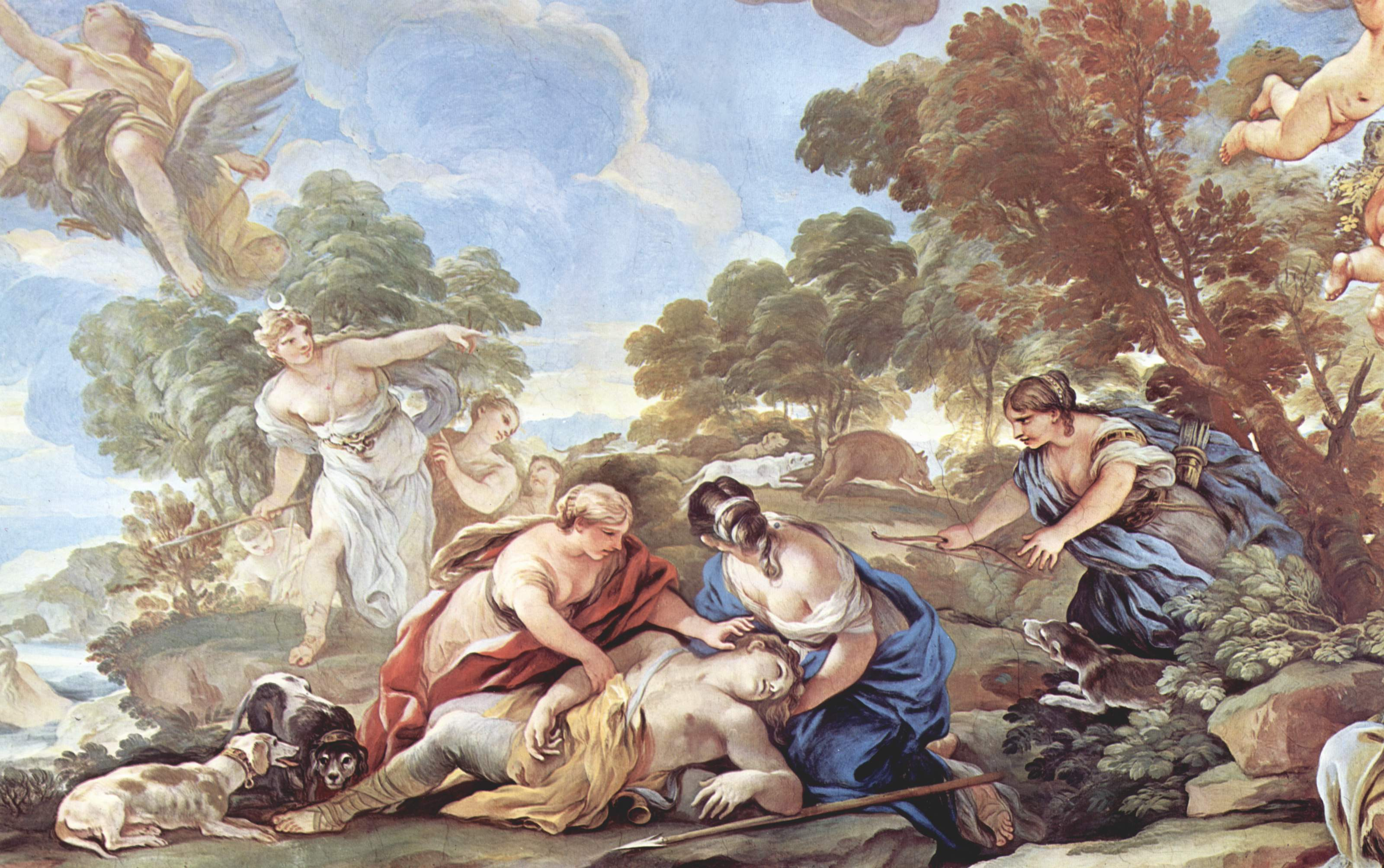
Death of Adonis, by Luca Giordano.

Strauss finished the orchestral arrangement on September 3, 1933, whilst staying at the Hotel Rez in Bad Wiessee (during the same visit he also orchestrated Mein Auge and Befreit). The premier of the orchestral version was given on 12 October 1933 in Berlin with Strauss conducting the Berlin philharmonic, Viorica Ursuleac the soloist.

- Woodwinds: two flutes, piccolo, two oboes, English horn, two clarinets, bass clarinet, two bassoons, and one contrabassoon
- Brass: four french horns, two trumpets, and three trombones
- Percussion: timpani and cymbal
- Strings: harp, violins, violas, cellos, and double basses
