= Adolf Friedrich von Schack =

German poet, historian of literature and art collector

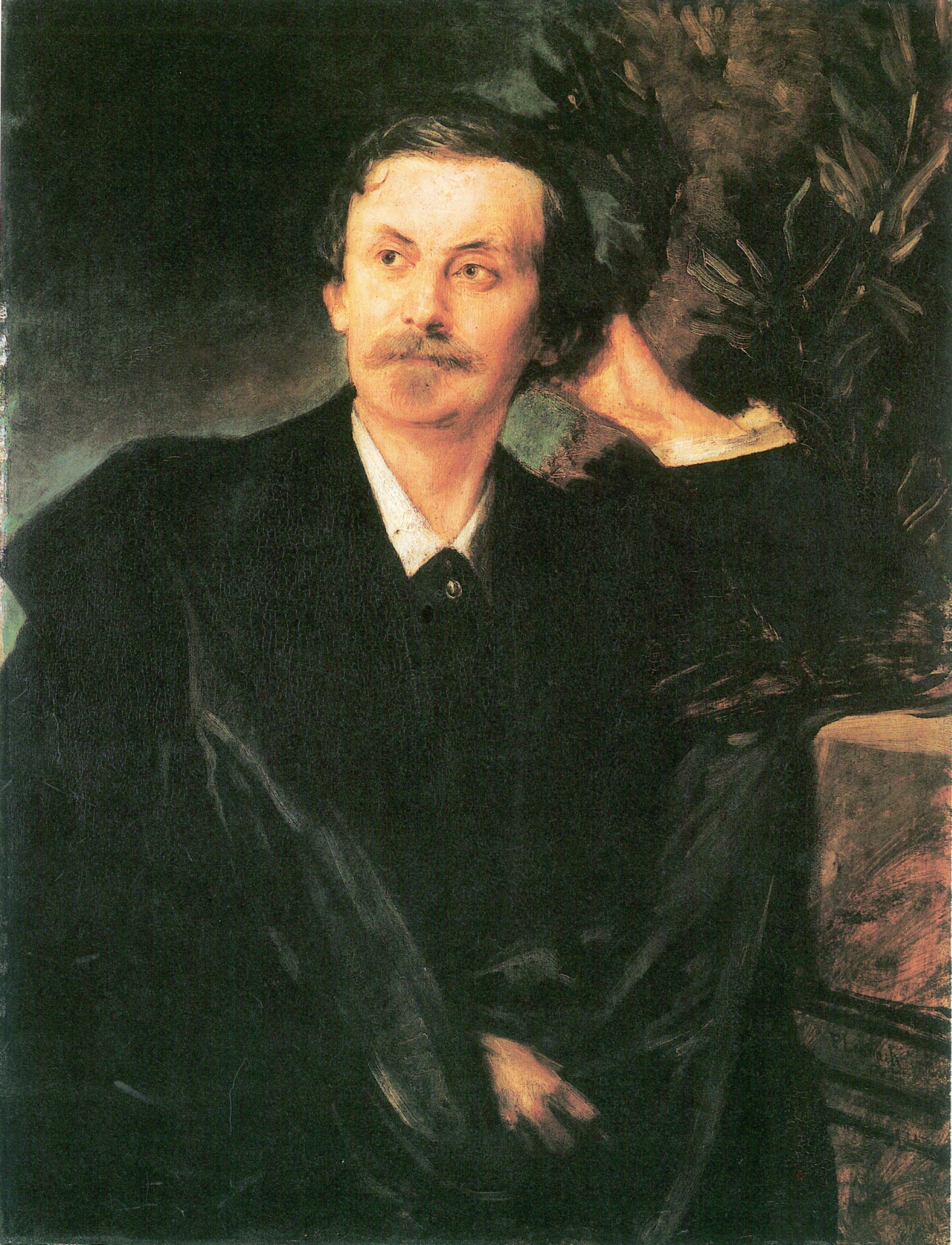
- Portrait by Lenbach
- Born: 2 August 1815; Brüsewitz
- Died: 14 April 1894 (aged 78); Rome
- Occupations: Poet; Historian of literature; Art collector
- Writing career
- Language: German

Adolf Friedrich, Graf von Schack (2 August 1815 – 14 April 1894) was a German poet, historian of literature, and art collector.

== Background ==
Schack was born at Brüsewitz near Schwerin. Having studied jurisprudence (1834–1838) at the universities of Bonn, Heidelberg and Berlin, he entered the Mecklenburg state service and was subsequently attached to the Kammergericht in Berlin. Tiring of official work, he resigned his appointment, and after travelling in Italy, Egypt, and Spain, was attached to the court of the grand duke of Oldenburg, whom he accompanied on a journey to the East. On his return, he entered the Oldenburg government service, and in 1849 was sent as envoy to Berlin. In 1852, he retired from his diplomatic post, resided for a while on his estates in Mecklenburg and then travelled in Spain, where he studied Moorish history.

In 1855, he settled at Munich, where he was made member of the academy of sciences, and here collected a splendid gallery of pictures, containing masterpieces of Bonaventura Genelli, Anselm Feuerbach, Moritz von Schwind, Arnold Böcklin, Franz von Lenbach, etc., and which, though bequeathed by him to the Emperor William II, still remains at Munich and is one of the noted galleries in that city. He died at Rome in April 1894, aged 78.

His museum opened in 1848 and remains open as a public art museum, the Schackgalerie.

== Works ==
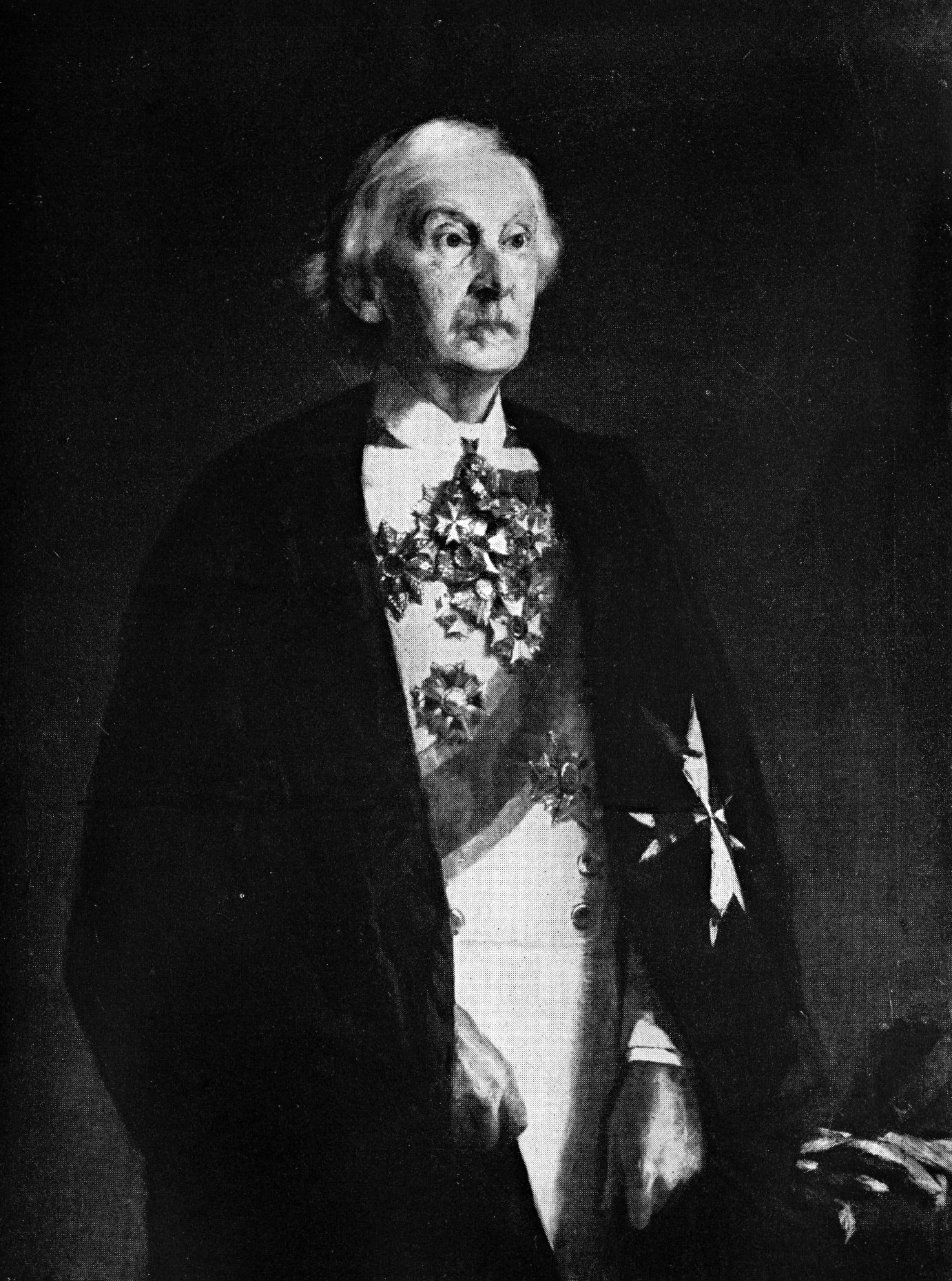
Adolf Friedrich von Schack, shown in the mantle and wearing the cross of the noble Protestant Order of Saint John.

=== Novels and poems ===
==== Lyric poems ====
- Gedichte (1867, 6th ed., 1888).
- Heimkehr (1885)

==== Novels in verse ====
- Durch alle Wetter (1870, 3rd ed., 1875) and Ebenbürtig (1876).

==== Dramatic poems ====
- Helidor (1878).

==== Tragedies ====
- Die Pisaner (1872) and Walpurga and Der Johanniter (1887).

==== Political comedies ====
- Der Kaiserbote and Cancan (1873).

=== Other aspects ===
==== Art and literature history ====
- Geschichte der dramatischen Literatur and Kunst in Spanien (3 vols. 1845–1846, 2nd ed. 1854), Poesie and Kunst der Araber in Spanien and Sicilien (1865, 2nd ed. 1877), which are valuable contributions to literary history.

==== Translations ====
- Spanisches Theater (1845), Heldensagen des Firdusi (1851) and Stimmen vom Ganges (1857, 2nd ed. 1877).

==== Catalogue and history of personal picture gallery ====
- Meine Gemaldesammlung (7th ed., 1894).

==== Collected works ====
- Gesammelte Werke, were published in six volumes (1883, 3rd ed. in to vols. 1897–1899). Nachgelassene Dichtungen were edited by G. Winkler (1896).

== Other information ==
See his autobiography, Ein halbes Jahrhundert, Erinnerungen and Aufzeichnungen (3 vols. 1887, 3rd ed. 1894). Cf. further the accounts of Schack by F. W. Rogge (1883), E. Zabel (1885), E. Brenning (1885), W. J. Mannsen (from the Dutch, 1889), and also L. Berg, Zwischen zwei Jahrhunderten (1896).
