= Macbeth (Strauss) =

1886–1888 symphonic poem by Richard Strauss

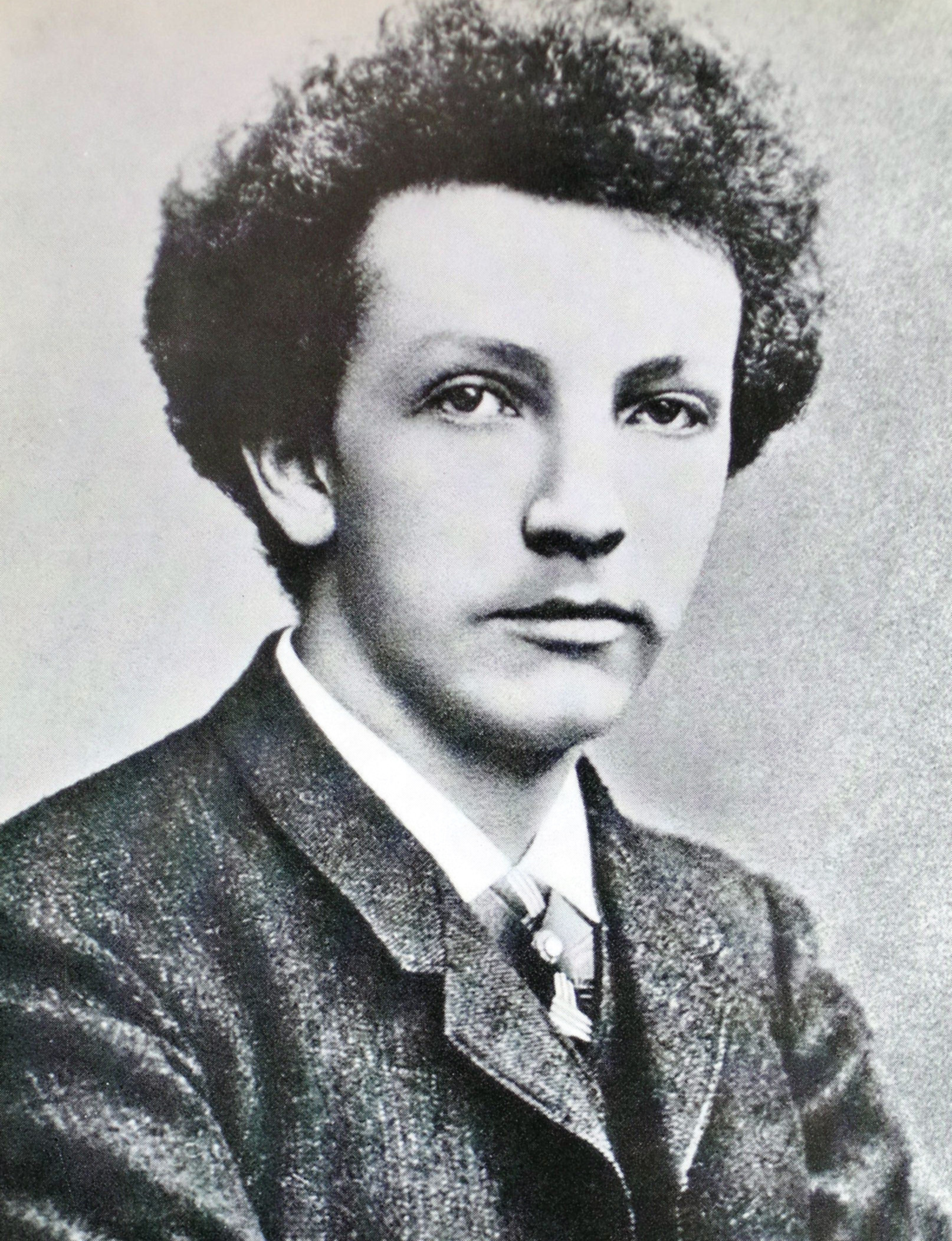
Richard Strauss, 1888

Macbeth, Op. 23, is a symphonic poem written by Richard Strauss between 1886 and 1888. The work was his first tone poem, which Strauss described as "a completely new path" for him compositionally. Written in some semblance of sonata form, the piece was revised more thoroughly than any of Strauss's other works; these revisions, focused primarily on the development and recapitulation sections, show how much the composer was struggling at this point in his career to balance narrative content with musical form. Bryan Gilliam writes in The New Grove Dictionary of Music and Musicians that:

New path or not, Macbeth failed to find a firm place in the concert repertory, because it lacked the thematic cogency and convincing pacing of musical events so evident in the two antecedent works [Don Juan and Tod und Verklärung (Death and Transfiguration)]. And despite revisions to the orchestration, in an attempt to restrain inner voices and highlight principal themes, Macbeth still falls short of Don Juan and Tod und Verklärung in sonic clarity.

== Instrumentation ==
The piece is scored for 3 flutes (3rd doubling piccolo), 2 oboes, English horn, 2 clarinets, bass clarinet, 2 bassoons, contrabassoon, 4 horns, 3 trumpets, bass trumpet, 3 trombones, tuba, timpani, bass drum, snare drum, cymbals, tam-tam and strings.

== Adaptations ==
Strauss's symphonic poem was adapted as a one-act ballet with choreography by Roman Mykyta, first performed by the Ballet Theatre of Maryland in February, 2024 in Annapolis, MD.
