= List of operas by Richard Strauss =

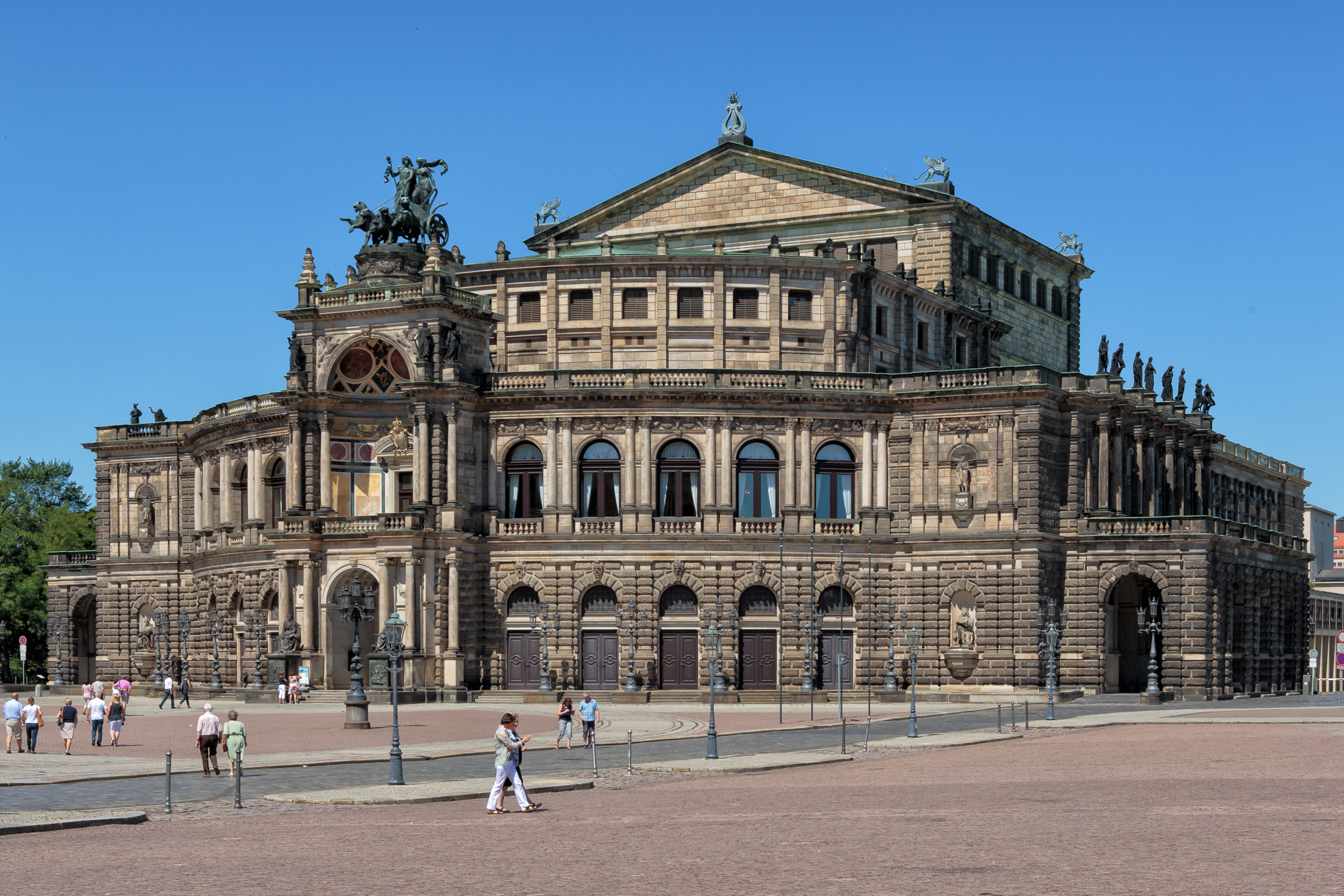
The Königliches Opernhaus (now the Semperoper) in Dresden, where many of Strauss's operas premiered

The German composer Richard Strauss (1864–1949) was prolific and long-lived, writing 16 operas from 1892 up until his death in 1949. Strauss "emerged soon after the deaths of Wagner and Brahms as the most important living German composer", and was crucial in inaugurating the musical style of Modernism. His operas were dominant representatives of the genre in his time, particularly his earlier ones: Salome (1905), Elektra (1909), Der Rosenkavalier (1911) and Ariadne auf Naxos (1912). His earliest work, Der Kampf mit dem Drachen (comp. 1876), was a juvenile sketch, and is not counted as part of his operatic oeuvre; his final opera, Des Esels Schatten (comp. 1947–1949), was unfinished at his death and completed by Karl Haussner in 1964.

== List of operas ==
Operas by Richard Strauss
Period (Note: Period during which the opera was written.)	Title	Genre	Act(s)	Librettist	Premiere		Op.	TrV
Period	Title	Genre	Act(s)	Librettist	Date	Venue	Op.	TrV
1876	Der Kampf mit dem Drachen	?	1 act	Körner	Unperformed		–	44
1892–93	Guntram (revised 1940)	Opera	3 acts	Strauss	10 May 1894; revised version: 29 October 1940	Weimar, Grossherzogliches Hoftheater (both versions)	25	168
1900–01	Feuersnot (Fire Famine)	Singgedicht (sung poem)	1 act	Wolzogen	21 November 1901	Dresden, Königliches Opernhaus	50	203
1903–05	Salome	Musikdrama	1 act	Strauss, based on Lachmann's German translation of Wilde (Note: Lachmann's German translation of the French play Salomé by Oscar Wilde.)	9 December 1905	Dresden, Königliches Opernhaus	54	215
1906–08	Elektra	Tragödie	1 act	Hofmannsthal, after Sophocles's Electra	25 January 1909	Dresden, Königliches Opernhaus	58	223
1909–10	Der Rosenkavalier	Komödie für Musik	3 acts	Hofmannsthal	26 January 1911	Dresden, Königliches Opernhaus	59	227
1911–12	Ariadne auf Naxos (Note: To be played after Le bourgeois gentilhomme by Molière.)	Oper	1 act	Hofmannsthal	25 October 1912	Stuttgart, Kleines Haus des Hoftheaters	60	228
1915–16	Ariadne auf Naxos, second version	prologue & Oper	1 act	Hofmannsthal	4 October 1916	Vienna, Kaiserliches und Königliches Hof-Operntheater	60 (II)	228a
1914–17	Die Frau ohne Schatten	Oper	3 acts	Hofmannsthal, after Goethe	10 October 1919	Vienna, Vienna State Opera	65	234
1918–23	Intermezzo	bürgerliche Komödie mit sinfonischen Zwischenspielen	2 acts	Strauss	4 November 1924	Dresden, Semperoper	72	246
1923–27	Die ägyptische Helena	Oper	2 acts	Hofmannsthal, after Euripides's Helen	6 June 1928	Dresden, Semperoper	75	255
1923–27	Die ägyptische Helena	Oper	2 acts	Hofmannsthal, after Euripides's Helen	14 August 1933 (new version)	Salzburg, Kleines Festspielhaus	75	255
1929–32	Arabella	lyrische Komödie (lyric comedy)	3 acts	Hofmannsthal, after his works (Note: After his story Lucidor, Figuren zu einer ungeschriebenen Komödie (1910) and the comic sketch Der Fiaker als Graf (1925).)	1 July 1933	Dresden, Semperoper	79	263
1933–34	Die schweigsame Frau	komische Oper	3 acts	Zweig, after Jonson's Epicœne, or The silent woman	24 June 1935	Dresden, Semperoper	80	265
1935–36	Friedenstag	Oper	1 act	Gregor	24 July 1938	Munich, Bayerische Staatsoper, Nationaltheater	81	271
1936–37	Daphne	bukolische Tragödie	1 act	Gregor	15 October 1938	Dresden, Semperoper	82	272
1938–40	Die Liebe der Danae	heitere Mythologie	3 acts	Gregor	14 August 1952	Salzburg, Kleines Festspielhaus	83	278
1940–41	Capriccio	Konversationsstück für Musik	1 act	Strauss and Krauss, after Casti	28 October 1942	Munich, Bayerische Staatsoper, Nationaltheater	85	279
1947–49	Des Esels Schatten (completed by Haussner)	Komödie	6 scenes	Adler, after Wieland (Note: Wieland's novel Die Geschichte der Abderiten.)	7 June 1964	Ettal, Ettal Abbey	–	294
