= Befreit =

- Lied by Richard Strauss
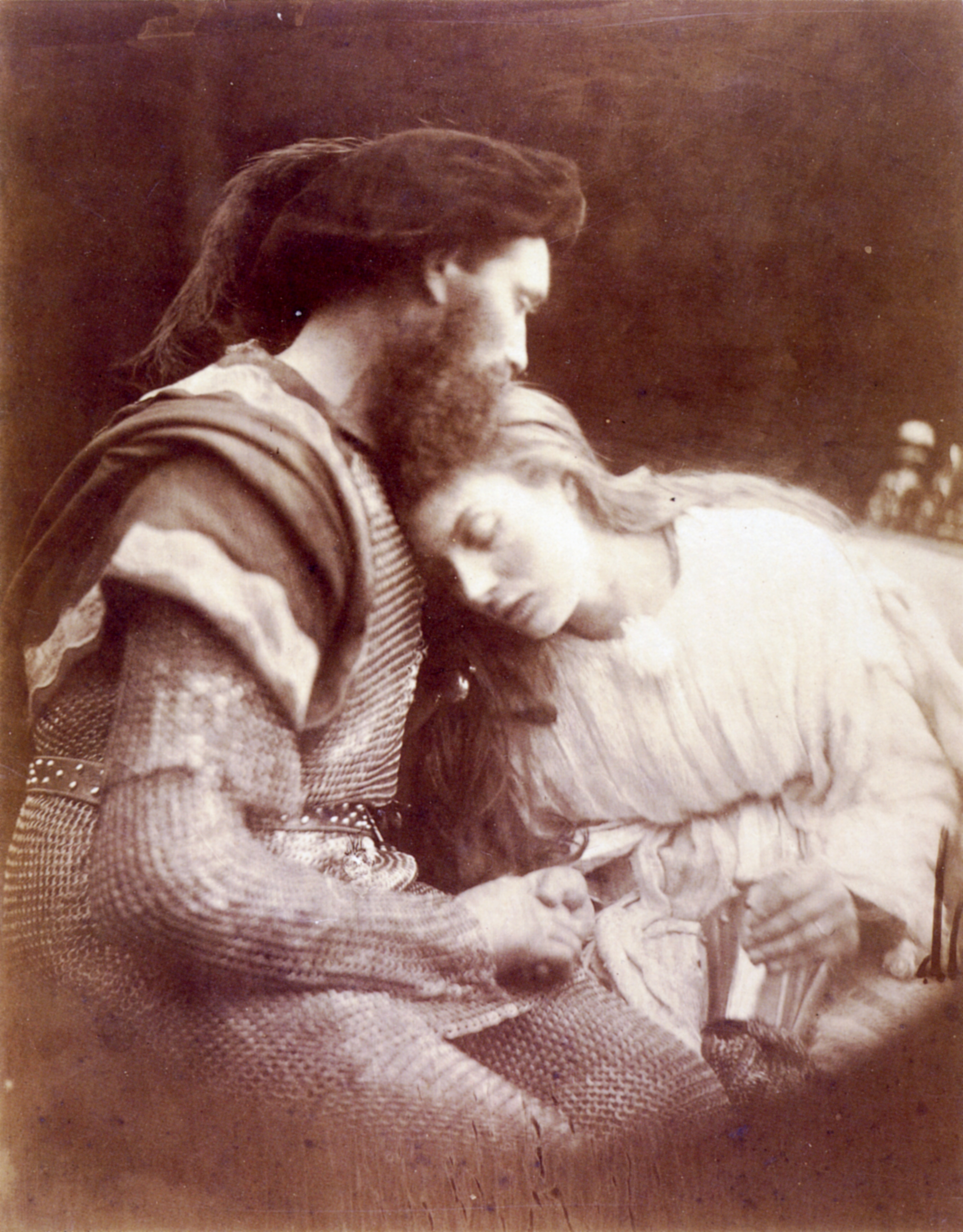
- The Parting of Sir Lancelot and Queen Guinevere by Julia Margaret Cameron, 1874
- English: "Released" or "Liberated"
- Catalogue: TrV 189
- Opus: 39, No. 4
- Text: Poem by Richard Dehmel
- Language: German
- Composed: 1 June 1898
- Dedication: Fritz Sieger
- Scoring: Voice and piano

"Befreit" ("Released" or "Liberated") is an art song for voice and piano composed by Richard Strauss in 1898, setting a poem by the German poet Richard Dehmel. The song is part of the collection Fünf Lieder für hohe Singstimme mit Pianofortebegleitung (Five songs for high voice with piano accompaniment). Strauss orchestrated the song in 1933.

== Composition history and reception ==
Strauss set eleven poems by the German poet Richard Dehmel between 1895 and 1901. Dehmel was a controversial figure in the Germany of Kaiser Wilhelm II, a socialist who had been convicted for blasphemy in Berlin during 1897. He was the same age as Strauss, and "Dehmel worked squarely within the aesthetic territory occupied by Strauss". Whilst Strauss had little interest in the politics of Dehmel, he shared the Nietzschean perspective that human lives are lived among and controlled by physical forces. Whilst the two had corresponded for several years, they first met on 23 March 1899 (Hugo von Hofmannsthal was accompanying Dehmel, and also met Strauss for the first time).

"Befreit" rapidly became one of Strauss' more popular songs. Richard Dehmel was less appreciative: "Richard Strauss set the following poem by me to music; it is a little bit too soft compared to the text, but it appeals to most people and is therefore performed more often". Norman Del Mar wrote that

The title word "Befreit" derives from the basic sentiment of the poem, an ultimate devotion which has "freed" the loving pair from suffering. The firm serenity of the music reflects the immortal quality of their love which is also emphasised by a phrase recalling the so moving passage of Gretchen's love by Liszt's Faust Symphony ... but the true refrain lies in the bitter-sweet phrase "O Glück" ("O Happiness", in the midst of sorrow) which crowns each verse in the song, and it is the melodic line which accompanies this which Strauss extracted when he chose "Befreit" to join "Traum durch die Dämmerung" to represent his Lieder output in the Works of Peace section of his new tone poem Ein Heldenleben written the same year.

Following Strauss, several composers wrote songs that were settings of Dehmel poems, including Reger, Schoenberg, Sibelius and Szymanowski. However, the only other setting of "Befreit" was written in 1913 by the relatively unknown Carl Goldmark.

== Lyrics ==
Befreit

Du wirst nicht weinen. Leise, leise
wirst du lächeln; und wie zur Reise
geb ich dir Blick und Kuß zurück.
Unsre lieben vier Wände! Du hast sie bereitet,
ich habe sie dir zur Welt geweitet –
o Glück!

Dann wirst du heiß meine Hände fassen
und wirst mir deine Seele lassen,
läßt unsern Kindern mich zurück.
Du schenktest mir dein ganzes Leben,
ich will es ihnen wiedergeben –
o Glück!

Es wird sehr bald sein, wir wissen's Beide,
wir haben einander befreit vom Leide,
so gab ich dich der Welt zurück.
Dann wirst du mir nur noch im Traum erscheinen
und mich segnen und mit mir weinen –
o Glück!

Liberated

Oh do not weep, love! Tho’ I shall miss thee
Bid me farewell, love, and fondly kiss me,
And I will return thy gaze and kiss.
Our sweet home in the woodlands, who but thou did’st adorn it?
I made it our world, our joy to own it!
O Bliss!

Then shall thy soft snow white hands caress me,
Thou shalt leave me your soul and bless me,
Leave me our babes with a mother’s kiss,
Thou gave me your life, thy love so tender
Both now to them I gladly render
O Bliss!

Life fast is ebbing, death comes tomorrow
We both then shall be released from sorrow,
Take now and give the farewell kiss.
Then I shall but see thee in dreams, asleep love,
Thou shalt bless me and with me shalt weep love.
O Bliss!

The 1898 Paul Bernhoff translation is a "singable translation" which is compatible with the vocal line Strauss wrote for the German. A more accurate translation of the German can be found in Alan Jefferson's 1971 book on Strauss Lieder - for example, in Jefferson's translation, the first verse is:

You will not weep. Softly, gently
You will smile; and, as before a journey,
I return your gaze and kiss.
Our dear four walls! You made them,
For you, I have opened them to the world.
O happiness!

In the last verse, Bernhoff has "Life fast is ebbing, death comes tomorrow", whilst a more accurate translation is "It will be very soon, as we both know". However, it is notable that Strauss used Bernhoff to prepare singable English translations of most of his well-known songs, including the four volume Universal Edition collection as well as the 5 Opus 39 songs which included Befreit, published by Rob Forberg.

=== Dehmel on Befreit ===
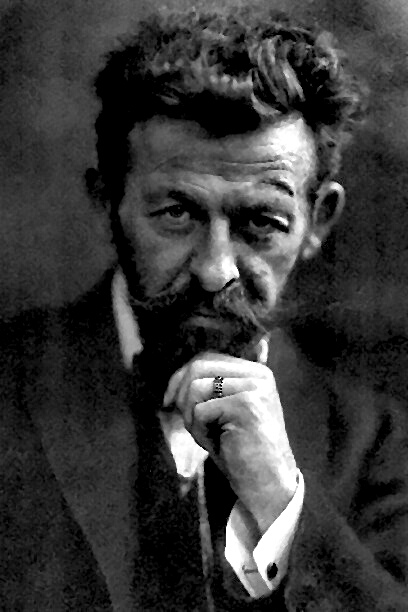
Richard Dehmel, the author of the lyrics, in 1905

Dehmel wrote about the poem:

I, for my part, had the picture of a man speaking to his dying wife. But, as works of art only aim at arousing human sensations and feelings in rhythmic harmony, I do not mind in the least that the allegory is also conceived of the other way around ... it can also allude to any kind of loving couple. Such mutual elevations of the soul – at least noble souls – apply not only to death, but to any parting for life; for every leave taking is related to death, and what we give up forever, we give back to the world ...

== Orchestral arrangement ==
In 1933 Strauss orchestrated the song for soprano Viorica Ursuleac whilst staying at the Bavarian resort Bad Wiessee. The orchestral song was first performed in Berlin on 13 October 1933 with the composer conducting the Berlin Philharmonic and Ursuleac singing.

- Two flutes, two oboes, two clarinets, bass clarinet, two bassoons
- Four french horns, two trumpets, three trombones, tuba
- Timpani
- One harp, harmonium
- Strings
