= Frankfurter Museumsgesellschaft =

German cultural association

The Frankfurter Museumsgesellschaft is a cultural association in Frankfurt, Hesse, Germany, which is responsible for the Frankfurt museum concerts. It manages the Frankfurter Opern- und Museumsorchester, which is both the municipal orchestra of Frankfurt and the orchestra of the Oper Frankfurt. Concerts take place in the Alte Oper concert hall. The orchestra is regarded as an important German symphony orchestra.

The organisation was founded in 1808, called Museum and responsible initially for literature, arts and music in Frankfurt, and for the museums.

== Founding ==
In 1808, Frankfurt citizens founded the Museum, a society for the "care of the muses" and the promotion of the fine arts: literature, arts and music. Among the founders were the librarian of the Prince-primate Karl Theodor Anton Maria von Dalberg, Nikolaus Vogt, the chief building officer Clemens Wenzeslaus Coudray and Baumeister Johann Friedrich Christian Hess. The statutes of the society limited the number of members to 150. Since its foundation, the society has also had symphonic music performed in its events known as the Großes Museum. For this purpose, the orchestra of the Frankfurt Comoedienhaus was engaged, the later opera orchestra. Frankfurt's musical life took a great upswing after the Napoleonic Wars. In 1817, Louis Spohr took over the direction of the orchestra, and in the same year the pastor and historian Anton Kirchner became chairman of the museum society. From 1821 to 1848 Carl Guhr conducted the orchestra. When he died in July of the revolutionary year 1848, the Museum Society decided to appoint its own director of the music class. This was the first time the municipal orchestra had two conductors: Kapellmeister of the theatre became Louis Schindelmeisser, while Franz Messer, who had been director of the Cäcilienchor Frankfurt since 1837, now also conducted the museum concerts. Until 1924, the municipal orchestra retained two artistic directors, one for the theatre and one for the concerts.

== The museum concerts in the Saalbau ==
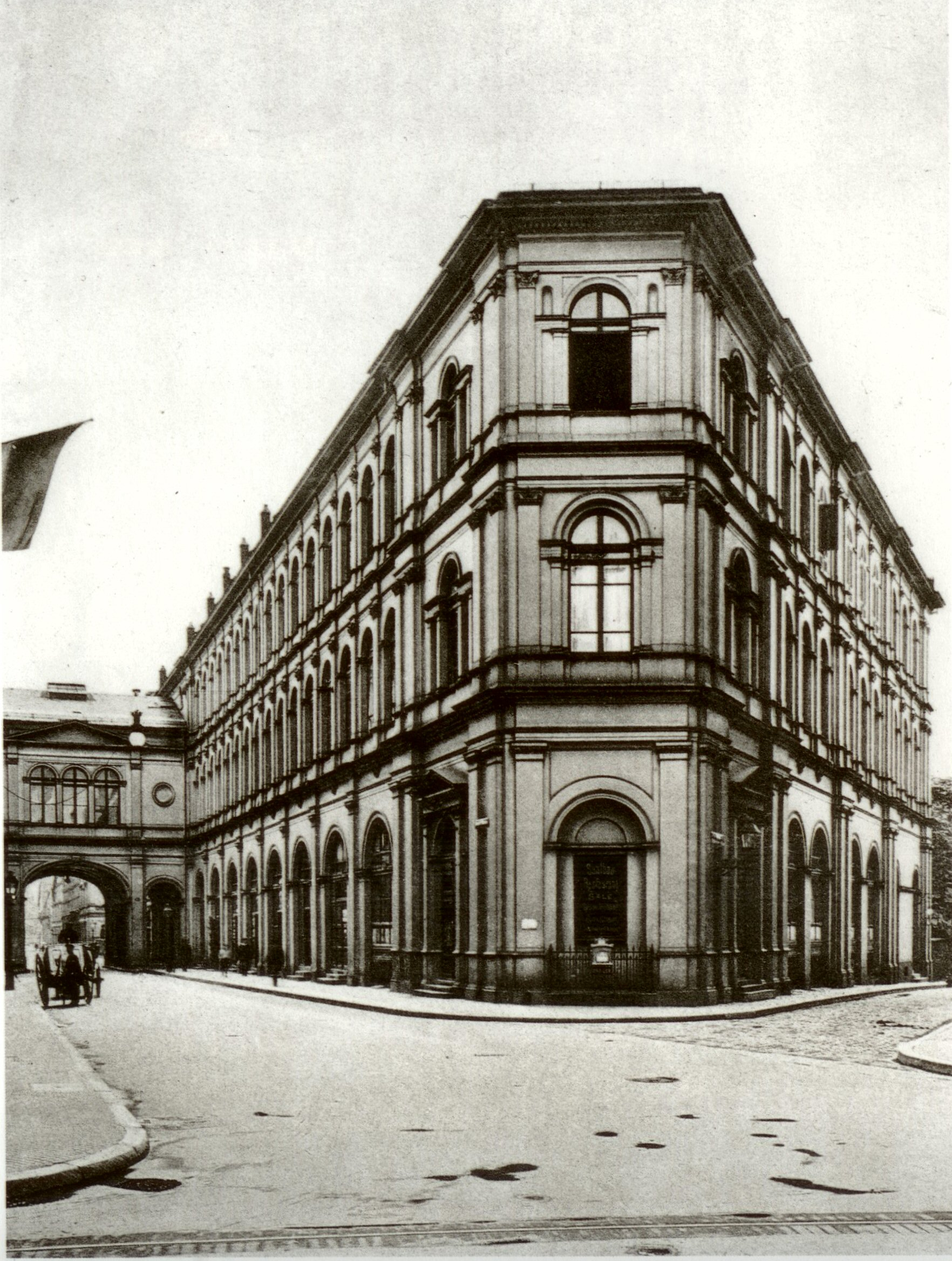
The Saalbau 1890

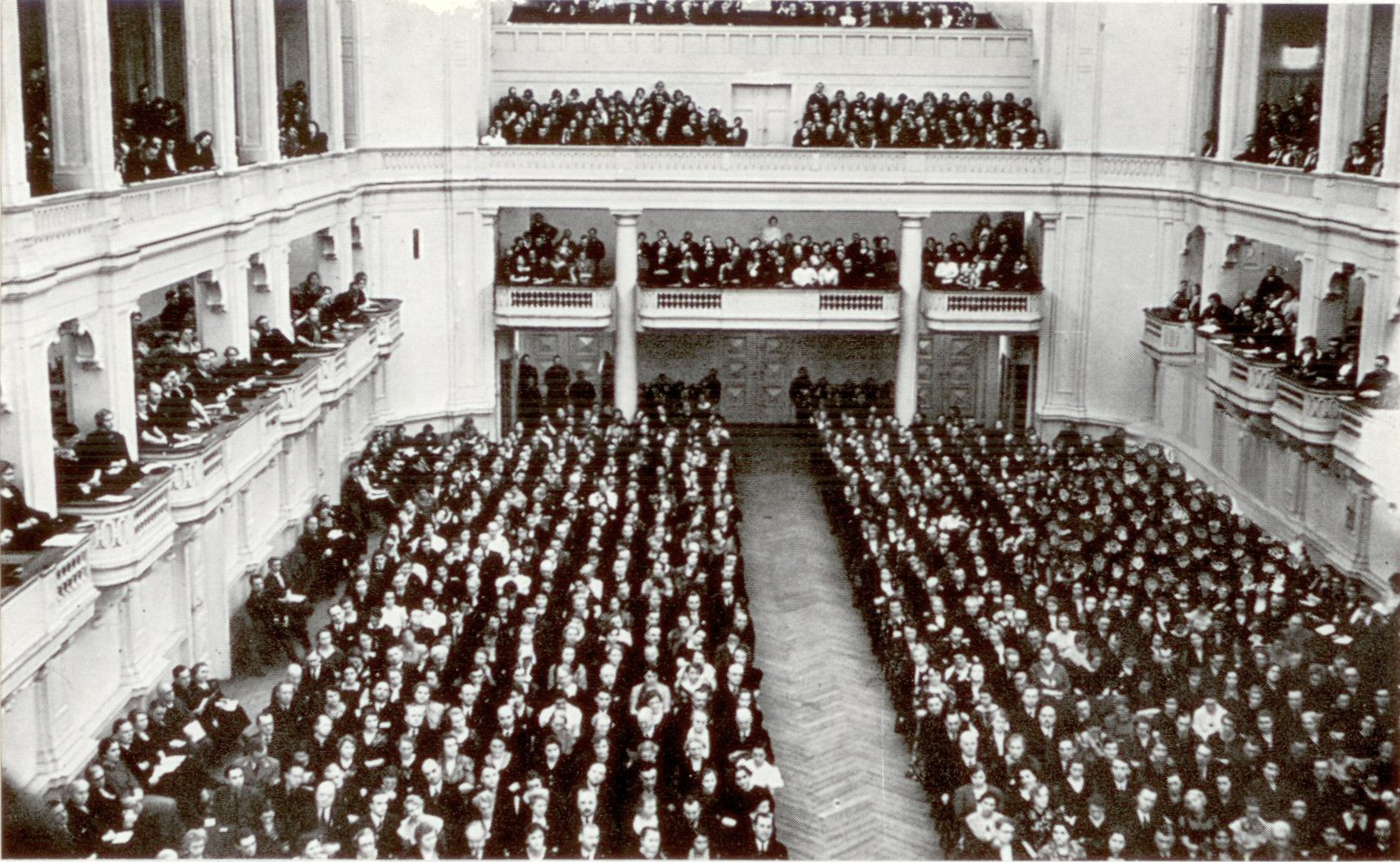
The Saalbau der Museums-Gesellschaft, site of many world premieres, destroyed in 1944

After 1848 the Museums-Gesellschaft focused more and more on music, although it continued to organise lectures with speakers such as Felix Dahn, Alfred Brehm and Richard von Helmholtz until 1886. From 1832 to 1860, the museum concerts took place in the Great Dining Hall of the Hotel Weidenbusch in Steinweg, which had room for 1000 visitors. In 1851, the Städel took over the important painting collections.

In 1860, Carl Müller took over the direction of the Museum Concerts, who succeeded Messer as conductor of the Cäcilienchor Frankfurt. In 1861, the concerts of the society were moved to the newly built hall building in Junghofstraße and thus made accessible to the general public. The Saalbau, a work of the Frankfurt architect Rudolf Heinrich Burnitz, had a concert hall with 1800 seats and a small hall for lectures and chamber concerts, plus the necessary ancillary rooms, as well as a banquet hall in the bridge building over Junghofstraße. The large hall measured 42 by 24 metres, was 14 metres high and had excellent acoustics. It was opened on 18 November 1861 with a performance of Haydn's Die Schöpfung. For eight decades, until its destruction in 1944, it remained the centre of Frankfurt concert life.

In addition to the orchestral concerts, the chamber music series was launched in 1870, in which Johannes Brahms appeared several times as a pianist and premiered some of his works. From 1887 Richard Strauss frequently conducted the museum concerts. His symphonic poems Also sprach Zarathustra (1896) and Ein Heldenleben (1899) were premiered here. He conducted the European premiere, after the world premiere in New York, of his Symphonia domestica in 1904.

In 1891 Carl Müller retired. When his successor was elected, the personal union with the Cäcilienverein, which had become a tradition, was broken for the first time. Gustav Kogel took over the museum concerts, while August Grüters, recommended by Johannes Brahms, became director of the Cäcilienchor. Kogel modernised the programme of the museum concerts, which now included works by contemporary and foreign composers such as Tchaikovsky, Bruckner, and Dvořák. Only one soloist was invited per concert evening, the orchestral works were now in the foreground.

In 1903, Kogel took his leave. The museum chose Siegmund von Hausegger as his successor, but he moved to Munich in 1906. The museum concerts experienced a heyday between 1907 and 1920 under the direction of Willem Mengelberg. From 1915 to 1922 the composer Paul Hindemith was the concertmaster at the first desk.

When Mengelberg left in 1920 after a conflict with the press, a two-year interregnum followed, during which Wilhelm Furtwängler conducted 16 museum concerts. However, he did not accept the call of the Museums-Gesellschaft, which would have liked to have him as chief conductor, but went to Berlin instead. The museum then entrusted his concerts to the young conductor Hermann Scherchen, a brilliant musician, who, however, with his commitment to the new music that was still unusual at the time, was not able to make a name for himself. Arnold Schönberg's, Igor Stravinsky or Paul Hindemiths disturbed the audience. In 1924 Scherchen turned away from the Museums-Gesellschaft and turned to the newly founded Frankfurter Orchesterverein.

Thereupon Clemens Krauss, who had shortly before been engaged as opera director, was appointed general music director, who for the first time since 1848 reunited the management of opera and museum in one hand. After five extremely successful years, Krauss went to the Wiener Staatsoper. His successor was Hans Wilhelm Steinberg from Cologne, who had previously directed a Prague stage. The Museums-Gesellschaft, however, refused to accept Steinberg's appointment as permanent conductor and instead negotiated with Issay Dobrowen, who conducted the majority of the museum concerts between 1929 and 1932, and with Otto Klemperer.

During the Great Depression of 1931/32, the Museums-Gesellschaft also got into financial difficulties, especially since the Frankfurter Rundfunk-Symphonie-Orchester, which had been under the direction of Hans Rosbaud since 1929, had become a competitor which had poached numerous subscribers from the museum.

After the Nazi seizure of power, the new Lord Mayor Friedrich Krebs (mayor) became an ex officio member of the Museum Society's board of directors and in this capacity attempted, among other things, to install Hermann Abendroth, who had proved to be true to his principles, as the new museum conductor. The Museums-Gesellschaft, however, refused to accept Gleichschaltung and refused to fill the position quickly. Georg Ludwig Jochum was permanent guest conductor of the museum concerts for five years, which were temporarily merged with the concerts of the "Reichssender Frankfurt" (formerly "Südwestdeutscher Rundfunk"). It was not until the 1937/38 season that Frankfurt was given a new general music director in the person of Franz Konwitschny, who remained in office until the destruction of the Opernhaus and the Saalbau on 22 March 1944.

== The museum concerts in the post-war period ==
After the Second World War, the museum concerts were resumed in 1946, initially in the hall of the Frankfurt Stock Exchange. From 1952, the symphony concerts were held in the renovated Schauspielhaus, which, as the "Großes Haus", has been the venue for the opera ever since. The chamber concerts were first held in the "Sendesaal" of the old broadcasting centre, later in the "Cantatesaal" and finally in the "Saal der Deutschen Bank" in Junghofstraße, where the hall had been located until the war.

Since 1981, all concerts of the Society have been held in the Alte Oper, which was rebuilt as a concert hall. The artistic director of the museum concerts is the respective Generalmusikdirektor of the Oper Frankfurt. Since the 2023/2024 season, this has been Thomas Guggeis.

Concert programs, beginning in 1848, have been held by the library of the University of Frankfurt.
