= Mass in F Minor (disambiguation) =

Mass in F Minor is a 1968 album by American rock band The Electric Prunes.

Mass in F Minor may also refer to:

- Mass No. 3, or Mass in F Minor, WAB 28, by Anton Bruckner (first performed 1872)
- Mass in F Minor by Josef Schnabel (1767–1831)
- Two settings of Mass in F minor by George Whiting (1840–1923)
- Mass in F minor, op. 22 (published 1846) by Bernhard Molique
- Mass in F minor, op. 51 (1934), by Egon Wellesz
