= Carl Guhr =

German classical violinist

Carl Wilhelm Ferdinand Guhr, also Karl Guhr (27 October 1787 – 23 July 1848) was a German violinist, composer, and, from 1821 until his early death, theatre Kapellmeister and music entrepreneur in the Free City of Frankfurt.

== Family ==
Born in Milicz, Silesia, Guhr came from a family of musicians. His father was Carl Christoph Guhr, a cantor at the Protestant Gnadenkirche, Militsch (now Polish Milicz), approx. 55 kilometres north of Breslau with a population of approx. 3,300, mainly Protestant at the time. This church was one of the six Silesian churches of grace that the Austrian emperor had to grant to the Silesian Lutherans in 1709. In 1797/98, Count Joachim Carl von Maltzan, who was for many years an envoy of Frederick the Great at the courts of Vienna, London, and St. Petersburg, had a new castle built in the classicist style by Carl Gottfried Geissler in Militsch. Until 1810, the count maintained a small castle chapel with well-paid musicians, including his father Carl Christoph Guhr. In 1811, this chapel developed into the first concert society in Silesia, which was led by his younger brother Friedrich Heinrich Florian Guhr (17 April 1791–1841),

== Training ==
Guhr received his basic musical training from his father Carl Christoph Guhr, who then enabled him to be accepted as a violinist in the court orchestra of the Count of Maltzan. From the composers and church musicians Josef Schnabel (1767–1831) and later Friedrich Wilhelm Berner (1780–1827) in nearby Breslau, he got further education. Also Georg Joseph Vogler, also called Abbé Vogler or Abbot Vogler (1749–1814), was later his teacher.

== Career ==
Guhr left his Silesian homeland. One reason may have been the Napoleonic Wars, which once again devastated this region and made Militsch poor. The feudal dependence of the town on Count Maltzan was also ended.

=== Würzburg ===
From 1807, Guhr was a chamber musician for violin in the Grand Duchy of Würzburg, which under his Habsburg Grand Duke Ferdinand, the former Grand Duchy of Tuscany, belonged to the Rhine Confederation from 1806.

=== Nuremberg ===
Joseph Reuter took over the theatre management to the delight of the Nuremberg people, and in 1808, he gave Guhr the position of a music director. In this town, which belonged to the new Kingdom of Bavaria since 1806, Guhr soon achieved professional and private success. He appeared several times as a celebrated violoncellist and composed several smaller operas. There, he met and married the 18-year-old singer Wilhelmine Epp (1792–1845).

=== Wiesbaden ===
In 1812 or 1813, he became musical director of the travelling theatre and opera troupe of the Duchy of Nassau in Wiesbaden, which had joined the Rhine Confederation under Frederick Augustus, Duke of Nassau in 1806. After the Battle of Leipzig from 16 to 19 October 1813, the Napoleonic power system of the Confederation of the Rhine broke up. The Duchy of Nassau withdrew from the Confederation of the Rhine and changed sides in time.

In Wiesbaden, Guhr met the exiled William I, Elector of Hesse of Landgraviate of Hesse-Kassel. William I was still considered one of the richest German princes of his time, and with the help of the Frankfurt banker Mayer Amschel Rothschild, he succeeded in saving this fortune beyond the Napoleonic era.

=== Kassel ===
On 26 October 1813 King Jérôme fled Kassel, the capital of the Kingdom of Westphalia he ruled. On 21 November 1813, after seven years in exile, the legitimate sovereign, Elector Wilhelm I, returned to his capital Kassel. At the beginning of 1814, the Electoral Court Theatre in Kassel was reopened, and Guhr was offered the post of music director and, at the same time, director of the Electoral Theatre, which he accepted. Soon the theatre and the opera house belonged to the best theatres in Germany. Among other singers, his wife Wilhelmine Epp shone in the opera. At the end of 1814, Guhr resigned from the management of the theatre and concentrated on opera. Here he wrote his own works and performed them. The first work was the music for the opera "Feodore and Deodata" by Kotzebue. The second work consisted almost exclusively of choirs, dances and romances. The third work was "The Vestal Virgin". In 1819, he composed the opera "King Siegmar". Soon there were conflicts with the Kasseler Theaterintendanz, because they tried to reduce the expensive opera business in favour of the Sprechtheater. Elector Wilhelm I died on 27 February 1821.

=== Frankfurt ===
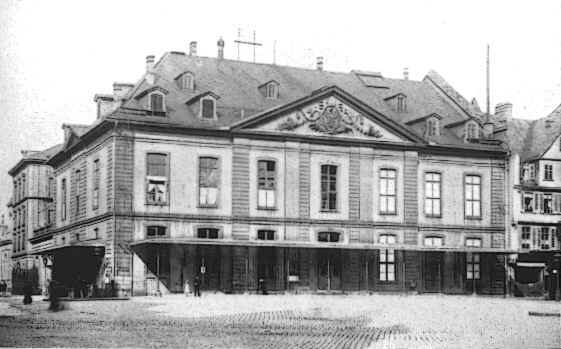
Frankfurter Stadttheater

In the winter of 1821, Guhr finally moved to the städtisches Theater in Frankfurt and was appointed kapellmeister of the Frankfurter Opern- und Museumsorchester. There, he was engaged for six years, soon after for 22 years.

Louis Spohr had been Carl Wilhelm Ferdinand Guhr's predecessor as Kapellmeister in Frankfurt from winter 1817 to September 1819. Along with Paganini, Spohr was considered the most famous violin virtuoso of his time and, at that time, the leading composer of the Romantic period. Spohr left this position to undertake a glorious major concert tour as well as extensive art trips to Belgium and Paris. Bizarrely, Louis Spohr was appointed general music director in Kassel in 1822, now under the reign of Elector Wilhelm II, as Guhr's successor.

Guhr met and listened to Niccolò Paganini in Frankfurt. He admired Paganini and followed the virtuoso's performances through various cities. Guhr allegedly even performed with him for a time in a string quartet. Guhr was also a brilliant musician, armed with an ability to read scores, fine hearing for music and a well-developed memory. These Guhr used to compile Paganini's unprinted compositions only by hearing them and record Paganini's wealth of technical features. This work was published as the paper Über Paganinis Kunst, die Violine spielen in 1829.

Guhr also had numerous contacts with well-known musical personalities of his time, such as Richard Wagner, Hector Berlioz, Hector Berlioz and others (who speaks highly of him in his "Mémoires") and Felix Mendelssohn Bartholdy, and has conducted many works by Beethoven. His conducting style seems to have been legendary from early on ("safe, strict and despotic conductor" (R. Wagner)), and he was also very well known as a violin and piano virtuoso in his day. He composed, among other things, operas, instrumental works and sacred music that are forgotten today, as well as masses and symphonies (well developed in contrapuntal technique).

He also ended his employment and became an independent music entrepreneur. He also took over the economic risks of opera and concert performances in Frankfurt. Together with Carl Malß and Leonhard Meck Guhr was one of the tenants of the Frankfurter Nationaltheaters from 1842. Additionally he was active as a music dealer on the side. He was well known in his time as a collector of Bach autographs. Already during his time in Nuremberg he took the opportunity to acquire the collection.

=== Bockenheim ===
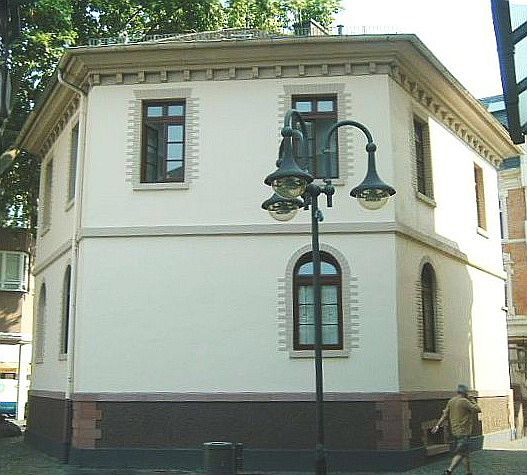
Guhr's residence in Bockenheim

Guhr lived far from Frankfurt in the city of Bockenheim, which at that time belonged to the Electoral Hesse region. There he lived with his wife until his death in 1848 in the Frankfurter Straße (today Leipziger Straße No. 9) in the hexagonal house built in 1826 by the architect and later mayor Philipp Brandt. This still existing house is known today, after a later owner, as Delkeskamp's House.

Guhr died in Frankfurt during the revolutionary year 1848 at the age of 60. He was buried at the Alter Friedhof Bockenheim on Solmsstraße. Only a photo of his gravestone from 1905 is preserved today. His grave was opened in 1909 on the occasion of construction work to widen Solmsstraße. The music stick found during this work was given to the Historical Museum of the town. In 1953, a commemorative plaque created by August Bischoff on behalf of the city of Frankfurt for the Bockenheim artists Friedrich Wilhelm Delkeskamp, Carl Wilhelm Ferdinand Guhr and Anton Felix Schindler who were buried there was placed in the Bockenheim Old Cemetery. Today it is located on the grounds of the Greek Orthodox parish "Prophet Elias" at the old cemetery wall.

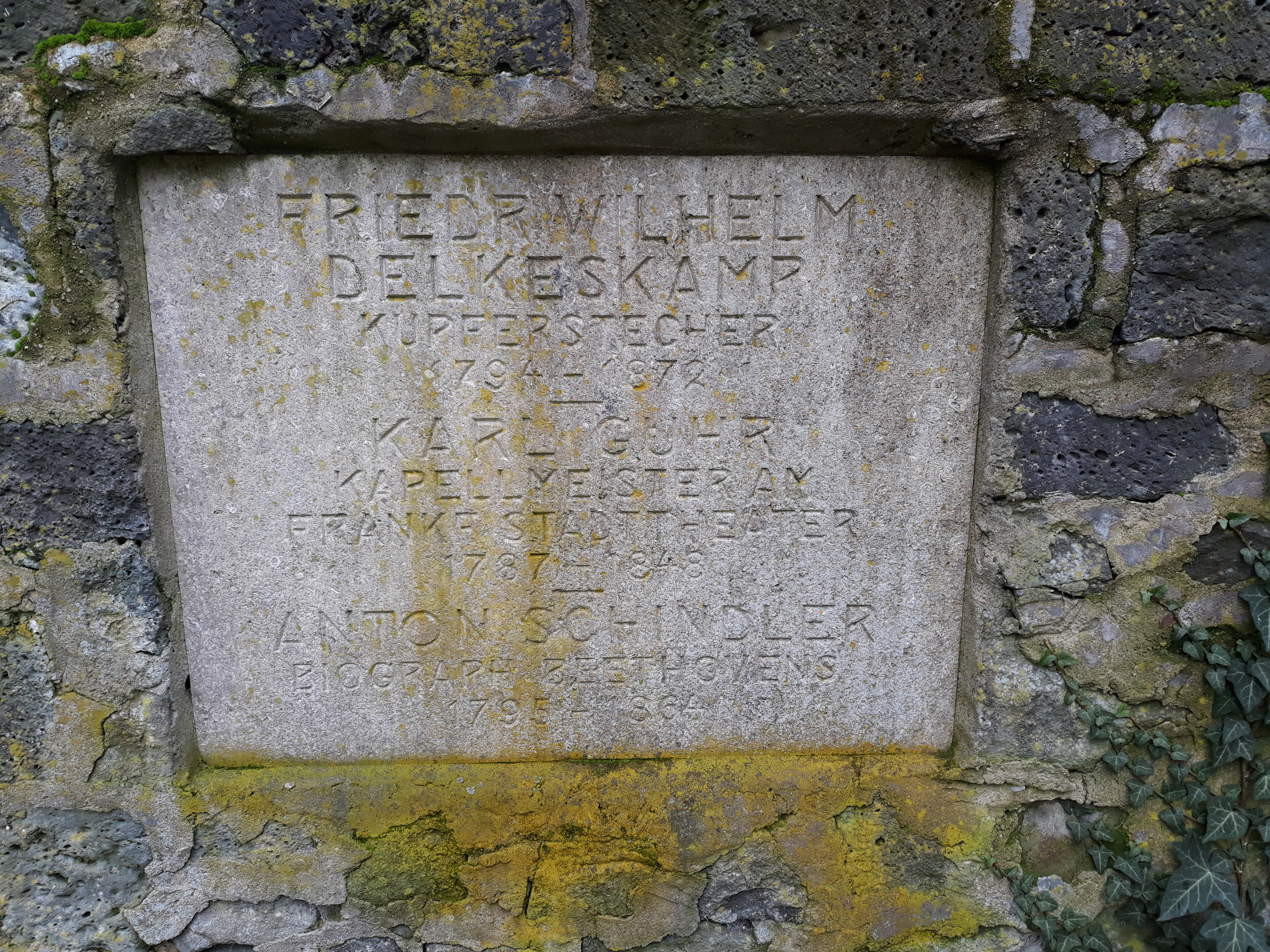
Memorial plaque for the graves of Guhr, Schindler and Delkeskamp on the old cemetery grounds in Bockenheim.
