= Volkstheater Frankfurt =

German theatre

Coordinates: 50°6′40″N 8°40′40″E

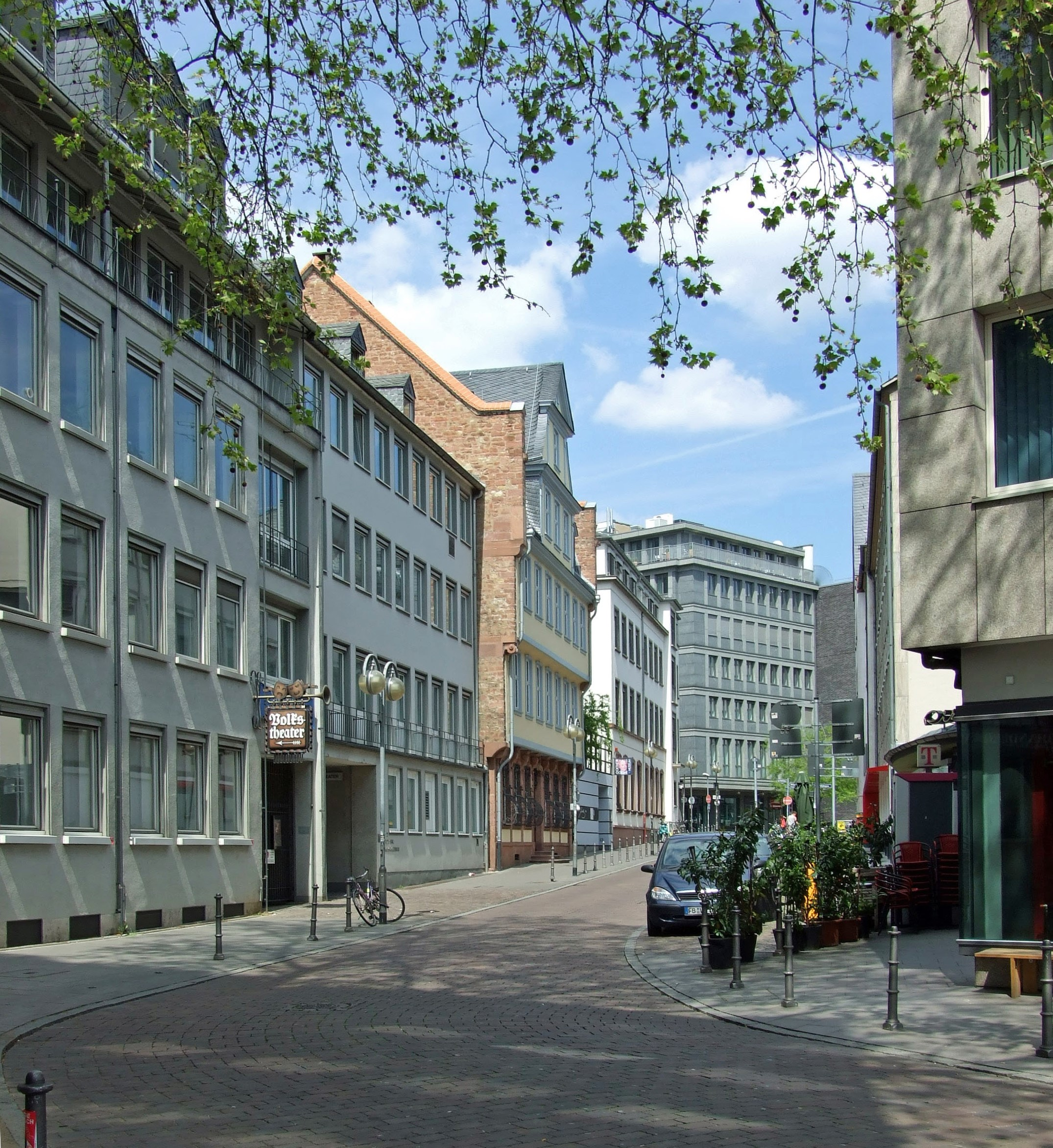
Entrance (left) below the Goethe House

The Volkstheater Frankfurt – Liesel Christ was founded in 1971 in Frankfurt by Liesel Christ. In addition to dialectal plays in Frankfurterisch and classical entertainment plays, it also performed adaptations of classical dramas, contemporary plays and rediscoveries of older stage literature.

== History ==
Under the direction of its founder and Wolfgang Kaus, the theatre established itself as an important cultural institution in Hessen. Twenty productions alone were recorded for television, including Alt-Frankfurt and Rendezvous im Palmengarten (by Adolf Stoltze), The Imaginary Invalid (by Molière, with Heinz Schenk), Die fünf Frankfurter (by Carl Rössler, the last appearance of Liesel Christ) and Der alte Bürgerkapitän (by Carl Malß, the inventor of the Jumping jack).

Ernst Nebhut wrote the Hessian "folk musical" Zur scheene Fraa for Liesel Christ in 1971 and thus gave this small dialect stage its first great success.

Since the death of its founder in 1996, it has been under the direction of Gisela Dahlem-Christ (artistic director). Until 2007, Wolfgang Kaus was the artistic director. Since 2010, the "Tatort" director Sylvia Hoffman was the artistic director of the theatre.

Five to six plays were staged annually. About 80,000 visitors came to the approximately 250 performances. In 2011, the Volkstheater celebrated its 40th anniversary. By then, a good 10,000 performances had been staged and over 3.5 million visitors had come to the Volkstheater.

Since the 1970s, the Volkstheater has played in the Cantatesaal next to the Goethe House in Großer Hirschgraben. In summer, open-air plays were held in the courtyard of the Dominican Monastery from 1975 to 2007. Until the New Frankfurt Old Town, numerous plays were also performed outdoors in the Imperial Palace Franconofurd in front of the Frankfurt Cathedral, for example the Urfaust and Der hessische Jedermann. In addition, there were numerous guest performances in Hesse as well as several guest performance tours to Israel.

For the 2009/2010 season, it was planned to give Michael Quast the artistic direction of the Volkstheater. However, he cancelled because "after careful examination of the economic situation of the theatre and its organisational structure" it turned out "that both are ailing." As a result, Quast founded the Fliegende Volksbühne Frankfurt.

At a press conference on 20 April 2012, it was announced that the Volkstheater would close at the end of the 2012/13 season, as the theatre building would be demolished and a move with new facilities would not be financially viable. The last curtain with the play La Cage aux Folles fell on 25 May 2013.

On 24 February 2013, 17 employees of the Volkstheater Frankfurt founded the Volkstheater Hessen association in the Cantatesaal in order to continue the aims and purpose of the Frankfurt Volkstheater even without a permanent venue and subsidies. The new association campaigned for the preservation of the Cantate Hall and collected signatures to this end.

In 2013, the city of Frankfurt decided to restore the Cantatesaal as part of the construction of the Deutsches Romantik-Museum. Since the beginning of 2020, it has served as the venue for the Fliegenden Volksbühne.
