= Samuel Friedrich Hassel =

German bass

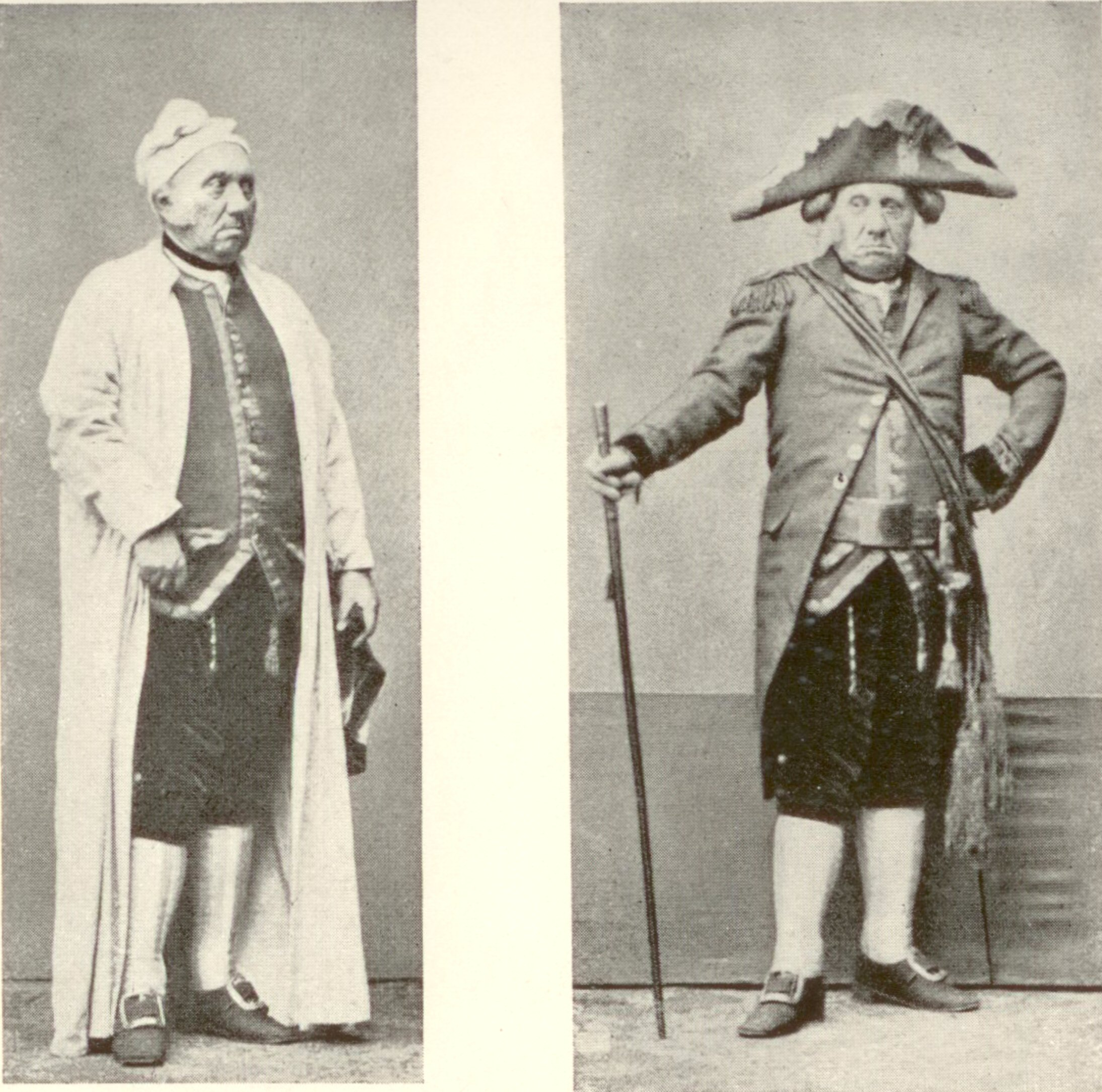
Hassel as Bürgerkapitän

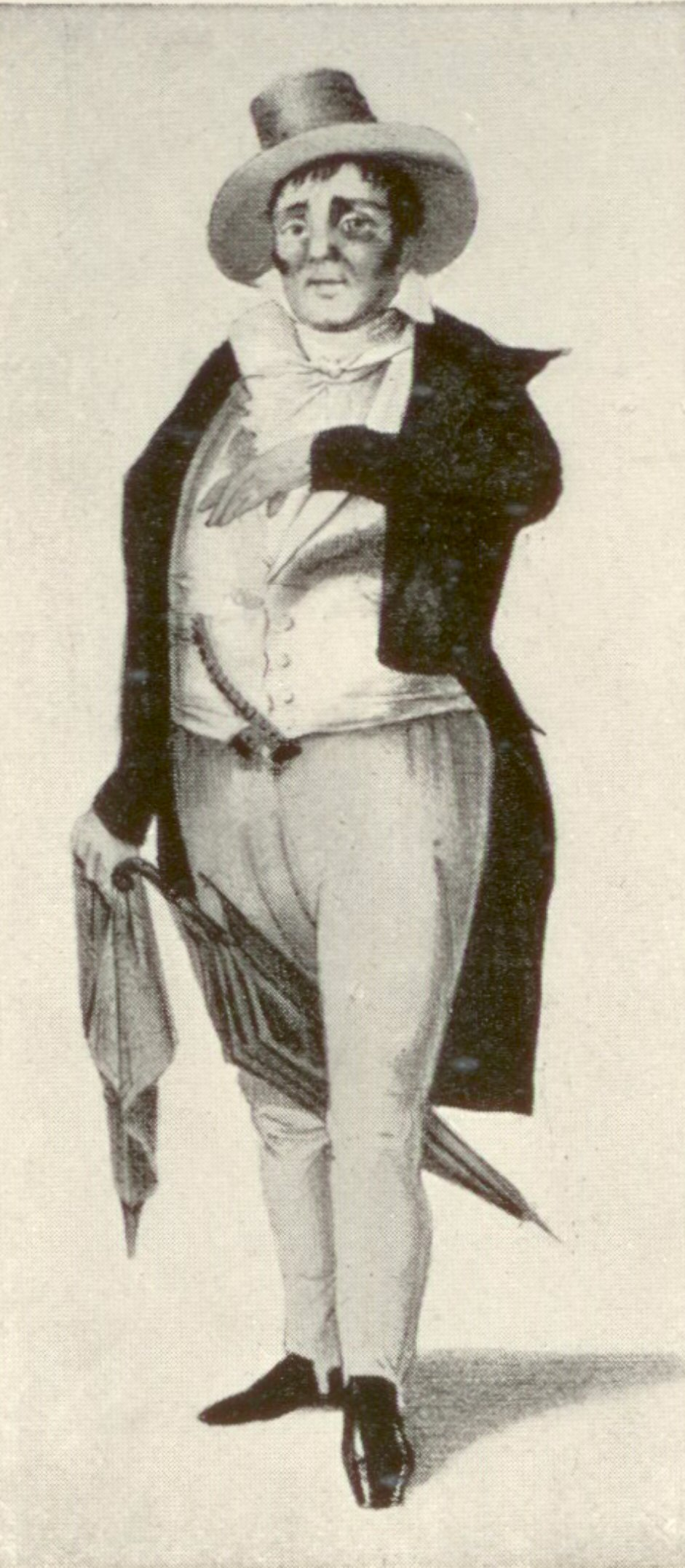
Hassel as Hampelmann in Die Landpartie nach Königstein

Samuel Friedrich Hassel (9 September 1798 – 3 February 1876) was a German bass singer, Volksschauspieler and comedian.

== Life ==
Born in Frankfurt, Hassel made his debut at the Frankfurt theatre at the age of 16. In 1816, he sang Rodrigo, his first solo part, in Peter Winter's opera Maria von Montalban. In 1818, he was appointed second bassist to Mainz, but returned to Frankfurt as early as 1821 despite great success. From then on, he performed only at the Frankfurt theatre for 45 years until his farewell performance on 26 March 1866.

Hassel was an extremely popular singer and actor. He played a leading role in almost every local Frankfurt play that premiered between 1820 and 1866. For over forty years, he gave the "Bürgerkapitän" in Carl Malß's comedy of the same name, and for over thirty years the "Hampelmann" in Malß' Landpartie nach Königstein. His voluntary confinement to the Frankfurt theatre and the local genre prevented him from gaining national recognition, but his versatility made him one of the great stage artists of his time.

On 31 October 1875, he performed again in a charity event. Hassel died on 3 February 1876 at the age of 77 and was buried in the Frankfurt Main Cemetery.
