= Push Puppet =

Wooden Toy

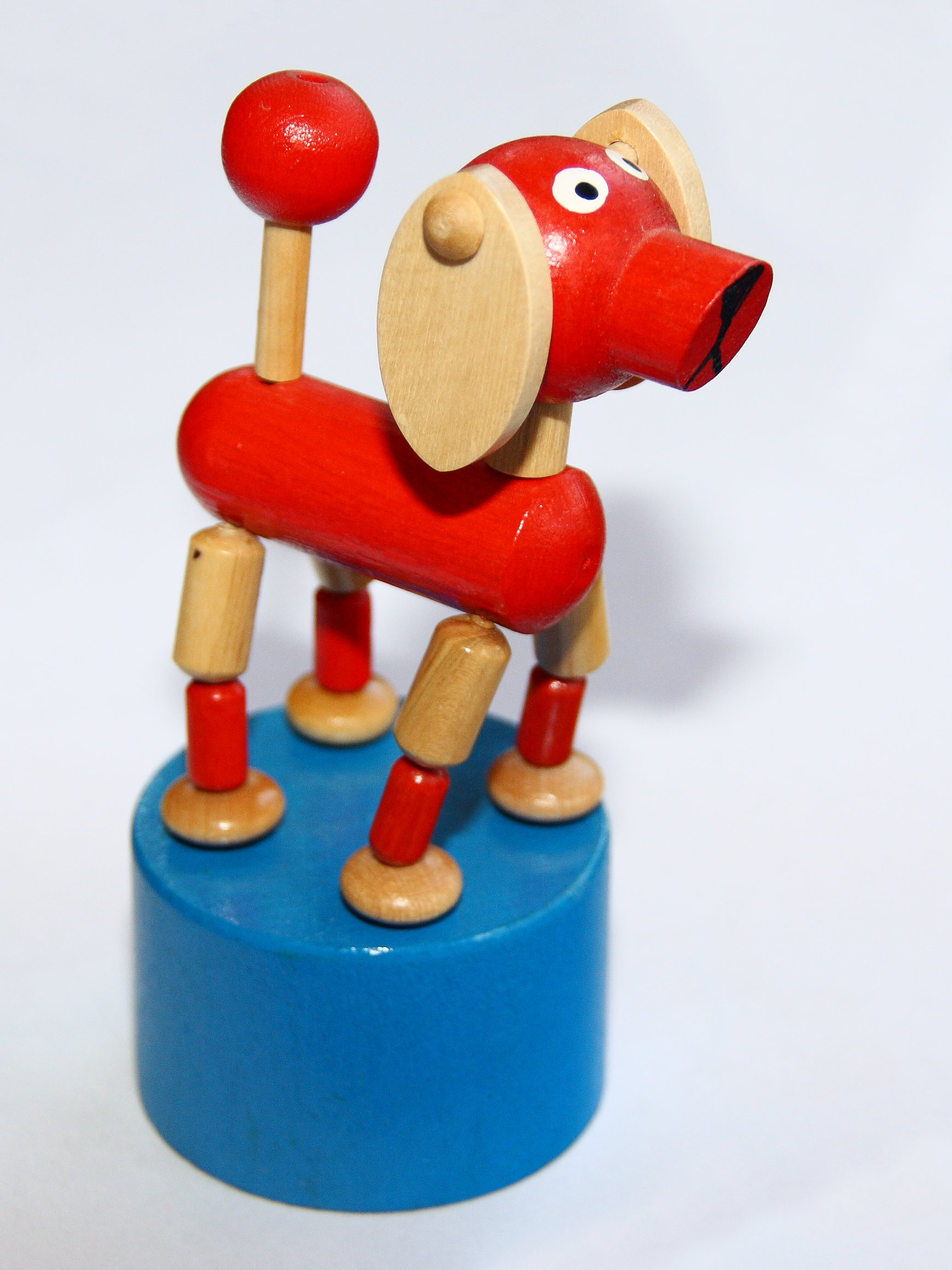
- Type: Wooden puppet
- Country: Switzerland
- Availability: 1926–present
- Materials: Wood, metal

The Push Puppet, also known as a Wakouwa or collapsing toy, is a toy that most often depict animals or people as well as occasionally plants or buildings. The figures stand upright on segmented limbs atop a wooden base. The wooden beads forming their limbs are threaded with string held under tension by a spring. When the button on the bottom of the base is depressed, it compresses the spring and releases the tension in the strings, causing the figure to collapse. When the button is released, the spring re-tensions the strings and the figure stands upright again. They may also be made of plastic.

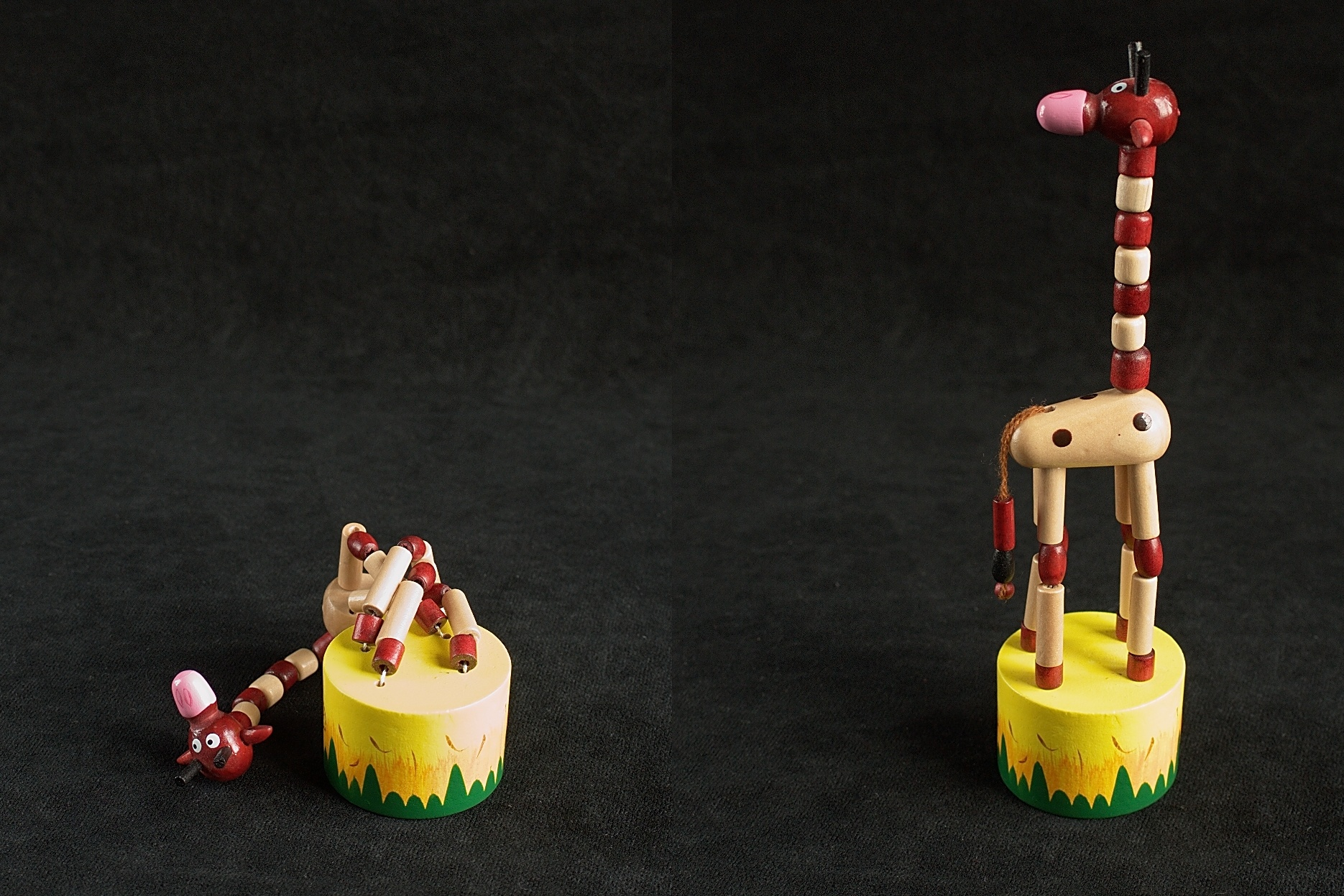
The collapsed and upright states

== History ==
The toy was named after its Swiss inventor, Walter Kourt Walss, by combining the first few letters from each part of his name: Wa, Kou, and Wa.

=== United States ===
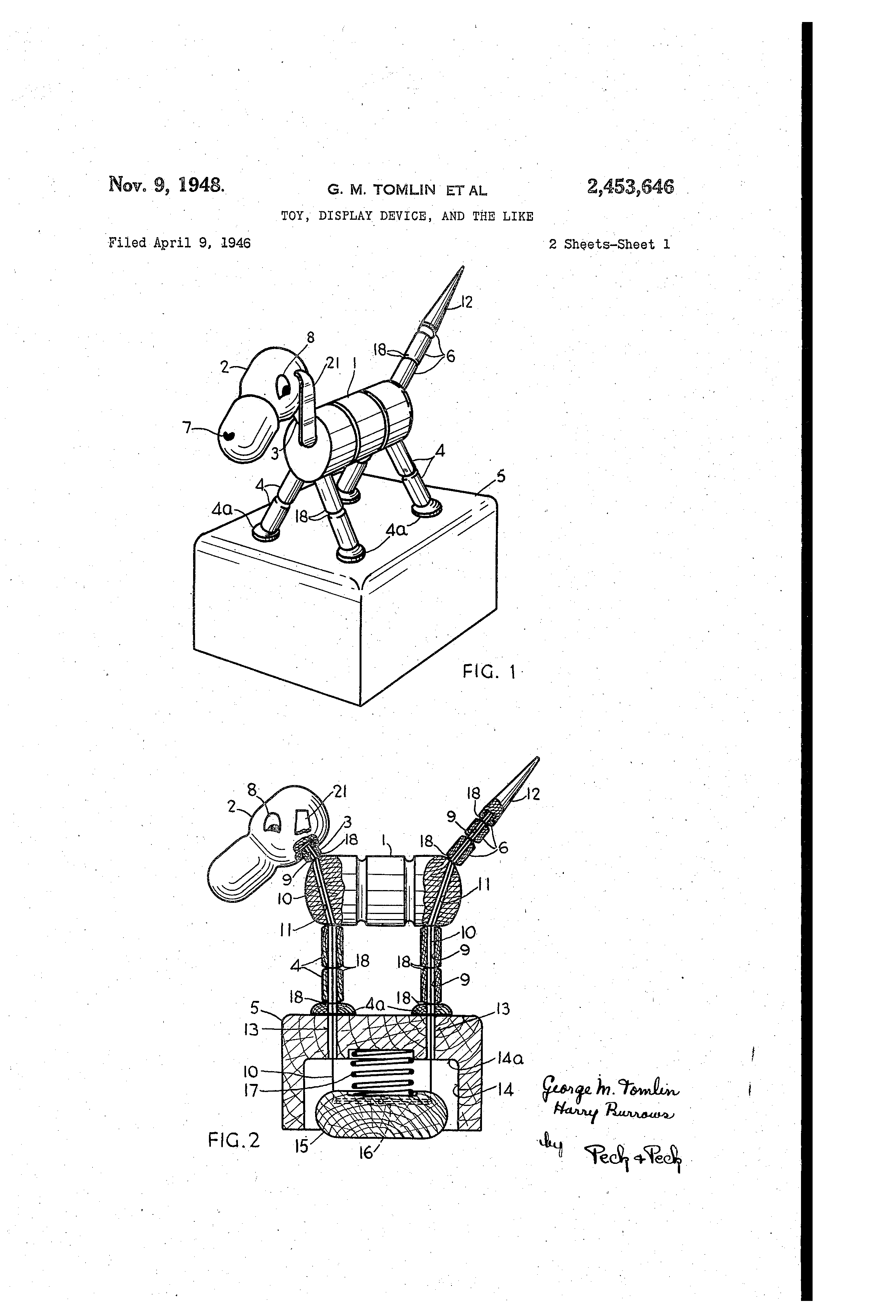
Internal mechanism

The earliest patent for a push puppet was filed in 1944 by Swiss inventor Marty Meinrad. A later patent was filed in April 1946 by English inventors George M Tomlin and Harry Burrows. "Wakouwa" was filed by Walther Walss in October 1946. They were manufactured in the US by Kohner under license from M. Meinrad and sold as "push-button puppets", and by other manufacturers as "push up puppets". There were several American push puppet designs produced, such as a cowboy on a horse, a football player, and various Marvel characters. Other famous characters made into push puppets include Atom Ant, Peter Pan, and Howdy Doody. Entertainment Earth sells San Diego Comic-Con-exclusive push puppets at its booth featuring popular characters such as Spider-Man and Gandalf.

=== Great Britain ===
Wakouwa dogs were mass-produced in the 1940s by Tri-ang and Lines, which held the British patent 580314 for the toy, in a factory in South Wales. Tri-ang held exclusive rights to sell the toy in Great Britain, North Ireland, Eire, Malta, Cyprus, Greece, Turkey, Africa, Asia, Australasia, and South America. They were a popular toy for the Christmas of 1946 in Britain and Australia. Wakouwa boxers were also manufactured and sold in Britain.

== Legacy ==
In 1947 a singspiel starring a Wakouwa donkey was premiered at the Renaissance theater in Vienna. Later that year, Radio Wien broadcast the song Kleiner Wakouwa by Sepp Scherzer.

Wakouwa are one of the 480 memories in Georges Perec's novel Je me souviens.

In the novel Wherever Grace is needed, the main character collects push puppets.

In several novels, collapsed characters or objects are compared to push puppets. In others, the push puppet is used to describe a rebounding behavior.

Push puppets inspired the invention of a tunable metamaterial.

== See also ==
- Jumping jack (toy)
- Jig doll
