= Otto Floersheim =

American composer

Otto Floersheim [last name pronounced Flairs-hime] (born in Aix-la-Chapelle, 2 March 1853; died 30 November 1917) was an American composer, critic and editor.

== Career ==
He received his musical education under Ferdinand Hiller in Cologne, and emigrated to the United States in 1875. There he became an editor of the Musical Courier in 1880. From 1894 to 1904, he was in charge of its Berlin bureau. James Huneker describes him as "fat, rather pompous, good-humoured and perspiring."

He is remembered for a damning review of an early performance of Richard Strauss's A Hero's Life: "... alleged symphony ... revolutionary in every sense of the word. The climax of everything that is ugly, cacophonous, blatant and erratic, the most perverse music I ever heard in all my life, is reached in the chapter 'The Hero's Battlefield.' The man who wrote this outrageously hideous noise, no longer deserving of the word music, is either a lunatic, or he is rapidly approaching idiocy." (Musical Courier, April 19, 1899)

== Works ==
His orchestral compositions include a "Prelude and Fugue," which was played in New York City under the direction of Theodore Thomas; "Alla Marcia," which was produced under Frank van der Stucken; a symphonic poem called Consolation, which was performed by the principal musical societies in the United States; and a piano composition with orchestra and organ accompaniment entitled Elevation, which was produced in Brooklyn under the direction of Anton Seidl. Another work for orchestra is Scherzo.
