= Frankfurter Opern- und Museumsorchester =

German symphony orchestra

- Orchestra
- Founded: 1792; 234 years ago 1808; 218 years ago
- Location: Frankfurt am Main
- Concert hall: Alte Oper, Oper Frankfurt
- Music director: Thomas Guggeis
- Website: oper-frankfurt.de/en/the-orchestra/the-frankfurter-opern-und-museumsorchester/

The Frankfurter Opern- und Museumsorchester (Frankfurt Opera House and Museum's Orchestra) is the resident orchestra of the Oper Frankfurt. Its somewhat peculiar name is derived from the series of "Museum Concerts", organized by the Frankfurter Museumsgesellschaft since 1808. The orchestra is ranked as an "A-list" ensemble under the German TVK regulations. Its music director and principal conductor is Thomas Guggeis.

== History and repertory ==
With a history spanning more than 200 years, the Frankfurter Opern- und Museumsorchester is one of Germany's oldest symphonic ensembles. It was founded in the late 18th century as the orchestra of the Oper Frankfurt, Frankfurt's municipal opera. In addition to playing in the opera house, the orchestra maintains a series of 10 subscription programs per season (each played twice, on Sundays 11 a.m. and Mondays 8 p.m. CET, respectively), performed at the Alte Oper Frankfurt, a former opera house converted into a concert hall.

The orchestra has attracted leading conductors and musicians since its founding. Composer-violinist Louis Spohr was the second principal conductor (1817–1819) of the Museumsorchester; his successors included Clemens Krauss, William Steinberg, Franz Konwitschny, Georg Solti, Christoph von Dohnányi, and Michael Gielen.

Other notable conductors and composers who led the orchestra have included Gustav Mahler, Richard Strauss, Arthur Nikisch, Hans Pfitzner, Willem Mengelberg, Wilhelm Furtwängler, Hans Knappertsbusch, Hermann Abendroth, Bruno Walter, and George Szell. The orchestra has played the premieres of several operas.

Richard Strauss' large-scale tone-poems Ein Heldenleben and Also sprach Zarathustra were both premiered by the Frankfurter Opern- und Museumsorchester. The Alte Oper reopened on 28 August 1981 with Mahler's Symphony No. 8, the "Symphony of a Thousand". Michael Gielen conducted the Frankfurter Opern- und Museumsorchester. A live recording of that concert is available on CD.

Many leading soloists have appeared with the orchestra, beginning with Johannes Brahms and Clara Schumann in the 19th century. From 1915 to 1923, composer-violist Paul Hindemith served as concertmaster of the Opern- and Museumsorchester. Its repertoire includes major operatic and symphonic works from Baroque to contemporary music.

In the 2005/2006 and 2006/2007 seasons, the Museumsorchester was voted one of the three top German opera orchestras in the country, selected by the leading operatic magazines in Germany. For the 2007/2008 season, the noted German periodical Die Deutsche Bühne voted the Oper Frankfurt the best opera house in Germany. Finally, in 2009, the respected music-industry magazine Opernwelt voted the Opern- und Museumsorchester Orchestra of the Year among all the German opera- and theatre orchestras, an honour the orchestra shares with the Bayerisches Staatsorchester; in 2010, 2011, 2025 and 2026 the orchestra was again named "Orchestra of the Year".

== Music Directors and Principal Conductors ==
- 1817 – 1819: Louis Spohr
- 1821 – 1848: Carl Guhr
- 1848 – 1860: Franz Messer
- 1860 – 1891: Carl Müller
- 1880 – 1892: Felix Otto Dessoff
- 1893 – 1924: Ludwig Rottenberg
- 1924 – 1929: Clemens Krauss
- 1929 – 1933: Hans Wilhelm Steinberg (aka: William Steinberg)
- 1933 – 1934: Bertil Wetzelsberger
- 1935 – 1936: Karl Maria Zwißler
- 1937 – 1938: Georg Ludwig Jochum
- 1938 – 1944: Franz Konwitschny
- 1945 – 1951: Bruno Vondenhoff
- 1952 – 1961: Georg Solti
- 1961 – 1966: Lovro von Matačić
- 1966 – 1968: Theodore Bloomfield
- 1968 – 1977: Christoph von Dohnányi
- 1977 – 1987: Michael Gielen
- 1987 – 1991: Gary Bertini
- 1991 – 1992: Hans Drewanz
- 1992 – 1997: Sylvain Cambreling
- 1997 – 1999: Klauspeter Seibel
- 1999 – 2008: Paolo Carignani
- 2008 – 2023: Sebastian Weigle
- 2023 – present: Thomas Guggeis

== Orchestra Members (2023–2024 season) ==
1st violin

Ingo de Haas, Dimiter Ivanov, Gesine Kalbhenn-Rzepka, Artur Podlesny, Vladislav Brunner, Arseni KulakovTarasov, Sergio Katz, Hartmut Krause, Basma AbdelRahim, Kristin Reisbach, Karen von Trotha, Dorothee Plum, Christine Schwarzmayr, Freya Ritts-Kirby, Juliane Strienz, Almut Frenzel-Riehl, Jefimija Brajovic, Gisela Müller, Beatrice Kohllöffel, Stephanie Gierden, Yoriko Muto, Tsvetomir Tsankov, Cornelia Ilg, Alexandra Tsiokou

2nd violin

Guntrun Hausmann, Jörg Hammann, Aischa Gündisch, Ruth Elisabeth Müller, Olga Yuchanan, Lin Ye, Susanna Laubstein, Donata Wilken, Frank Plieninger, Nobuko Yamaguchi, Lutz ter Voert, Sara Schulz, Peter Szasz, Yu-Lin Tsai, Merve Uslu, Samuel Park, Miri Kim, Shaoling Jin

viola

Thomas Rössel, Philipp Nickel, Wolf Attula, Lev Loiko, Guillaume Faraut, Jean-Marc Vogt, Mathias Bild, Fred Günther, Ulla Tremuth, Susanna Bienroth, Ariane Voigt, Elisabeth Friedrichs, Friederike Gutsch, Gabriele Piras, Maria del Mar Mendivil Colom, Vaida Rozinskaite

cello

Rüdiger Clauß, Mikhail Nemtsov, Sabine Krams, Lukas Plag, Johannes Oesterlee, Florian Fischer, Roland Horn, Nika Brnič Uhrhan, Mario Riemer, Bogdan Michael Kisch, Janis Marquard

double-bass

Bruno Suys, Tamás Frank-Dessauer, Hedwig Matros-Büsing, Peter Josiger, Rafael Kufer, Ulrich Goltz, Matthias Kuckuk, Philipp Enger, Jean Hommel, Kalle Helm

flute

Sarah Louvion, Eduardo Belmar, Elizaveta Ivanova, Almuth Turré, Giovanni Gandolfo

oboe

Nanako Becker, Johannes Grosso, Márta Berger, Aurélien Laizé

clarinet

Jens Bischof, Claudia Dresel, Diemut Schneider, Ramón Femenía, Matthias Höfer

bassoon

André Rocha, Richard Morschel, Henrike Kirsch, Eberhard Beer

horn

Matthijs Heugen, Ku-Hsin Chen, Joseph Longstaff, Stef van Herten, Tuna Erten, Claude Tremuth, Genevieve Clifford, Sara Oliveira

trumpet

Matthias Kowalczyk, Florian Pichler, Balázs Drrahos, Markus Bebek, Wolfgang Guggenberger, Dominik Ring

trombone

Jeroen Mentens, Miguel García Casas, Hartmut Friedrich, Manfred Keller, Rainer Hoffmann

tuba

József Juhász-Aba

timpani

Tobias Kästle, Ulrich Weber

percussion

Jürgen Friedel, Nicole Hartig-Dietz, Steffen Uhrhan, David Friederich

harp

Francoise Verherve, Barbara Mayr-Winkler, Sara Esturillo Sanchez

orchestra assistants

Torsten Frenzl, Anton Lauer, Ivan Scaglione, Aaron Veil, Hanns Will

== Venues ==
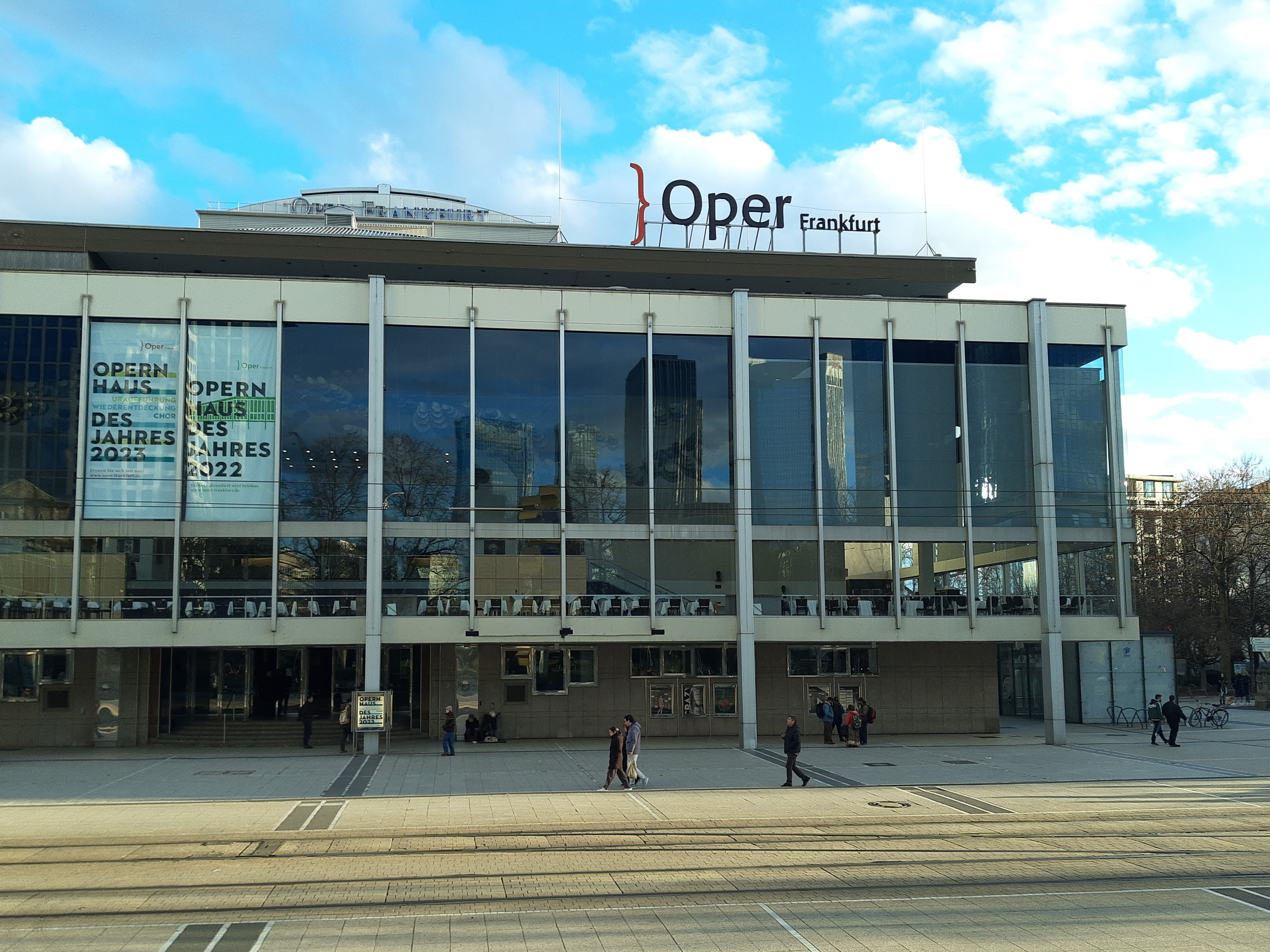
Oper Frankfurt (Resident orchestra)

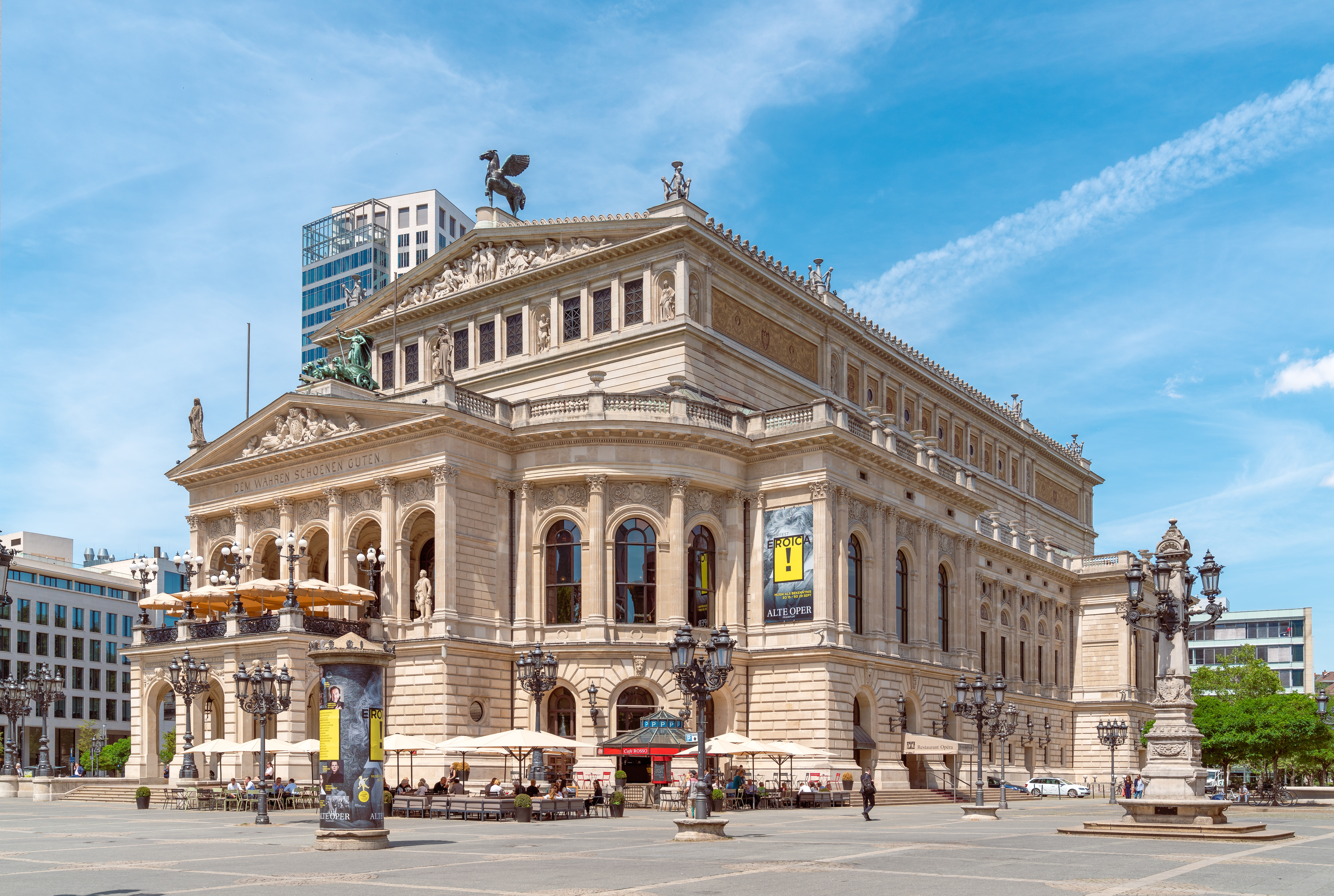
Alte Oper (Museumskonzerte)

== Books ==
- Bartholomäi, Paul (2002). Das Frankfurter Museums-Orchester (in German). Frankfurt/M. Leipzig London New York: Musikverl. Peters. ISBN 978-3-87626-224-6.
