= Jumping jack (toy) =

Puppet-like toy

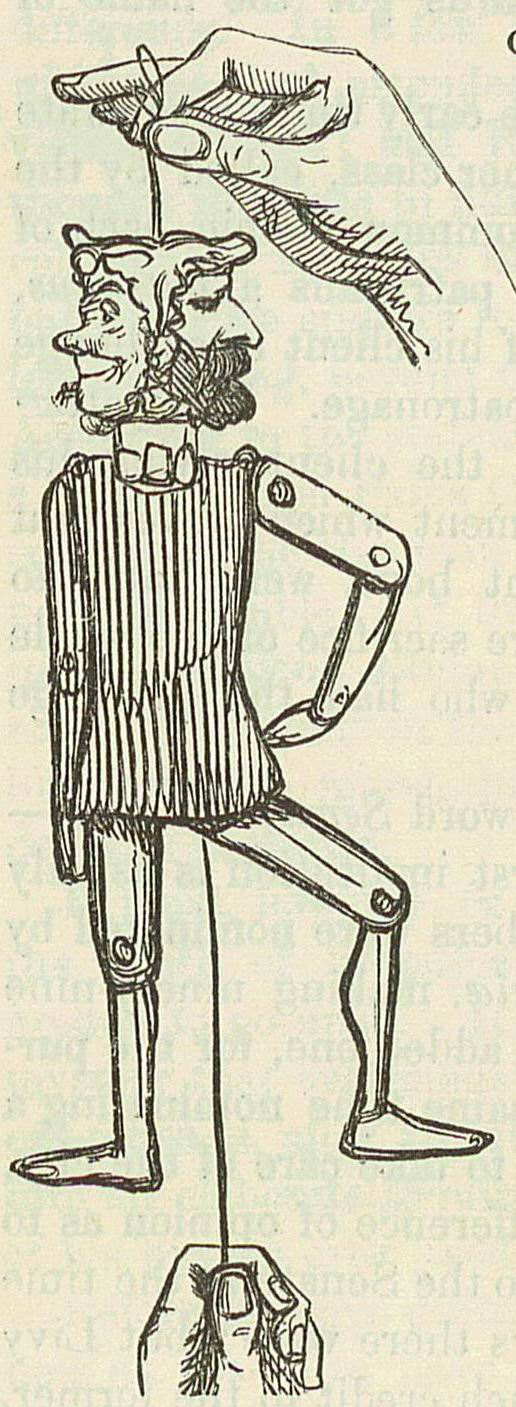
A jumping jack toy, c. 1850

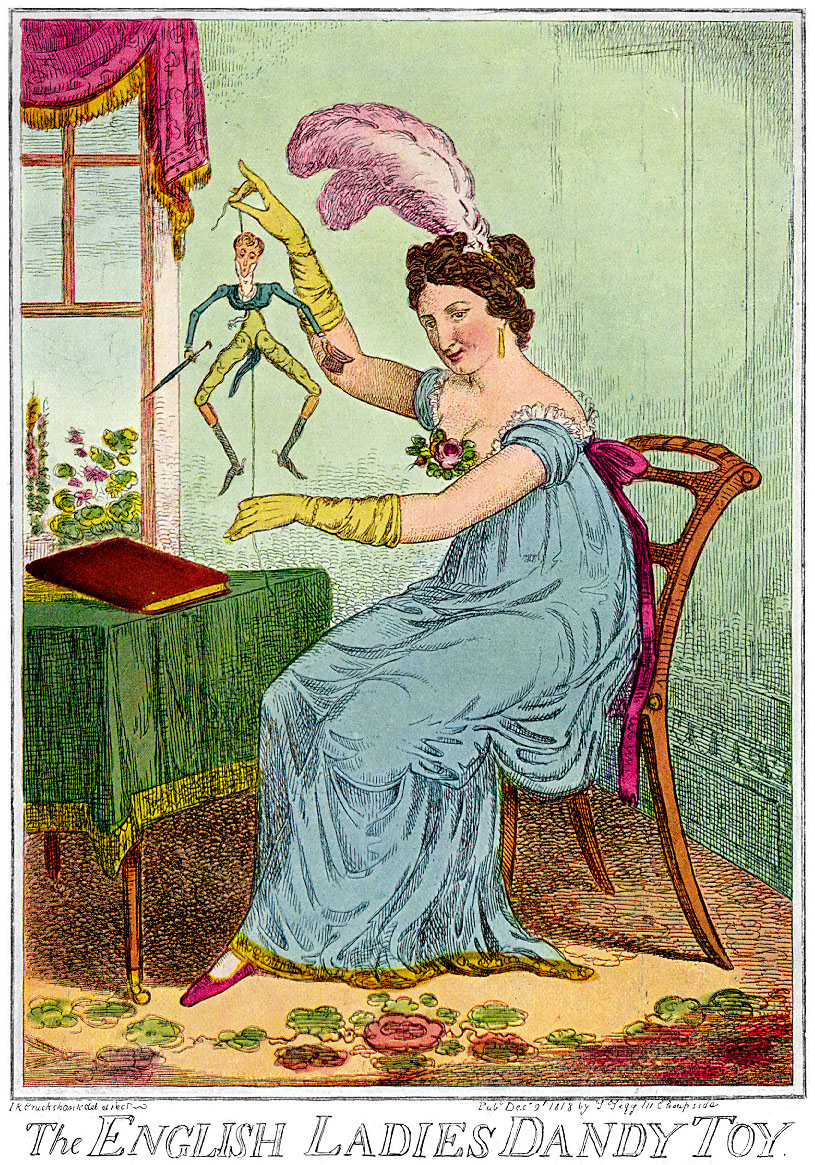
Caricature of a lady with a jumping jack dressed as a dandy, 1818

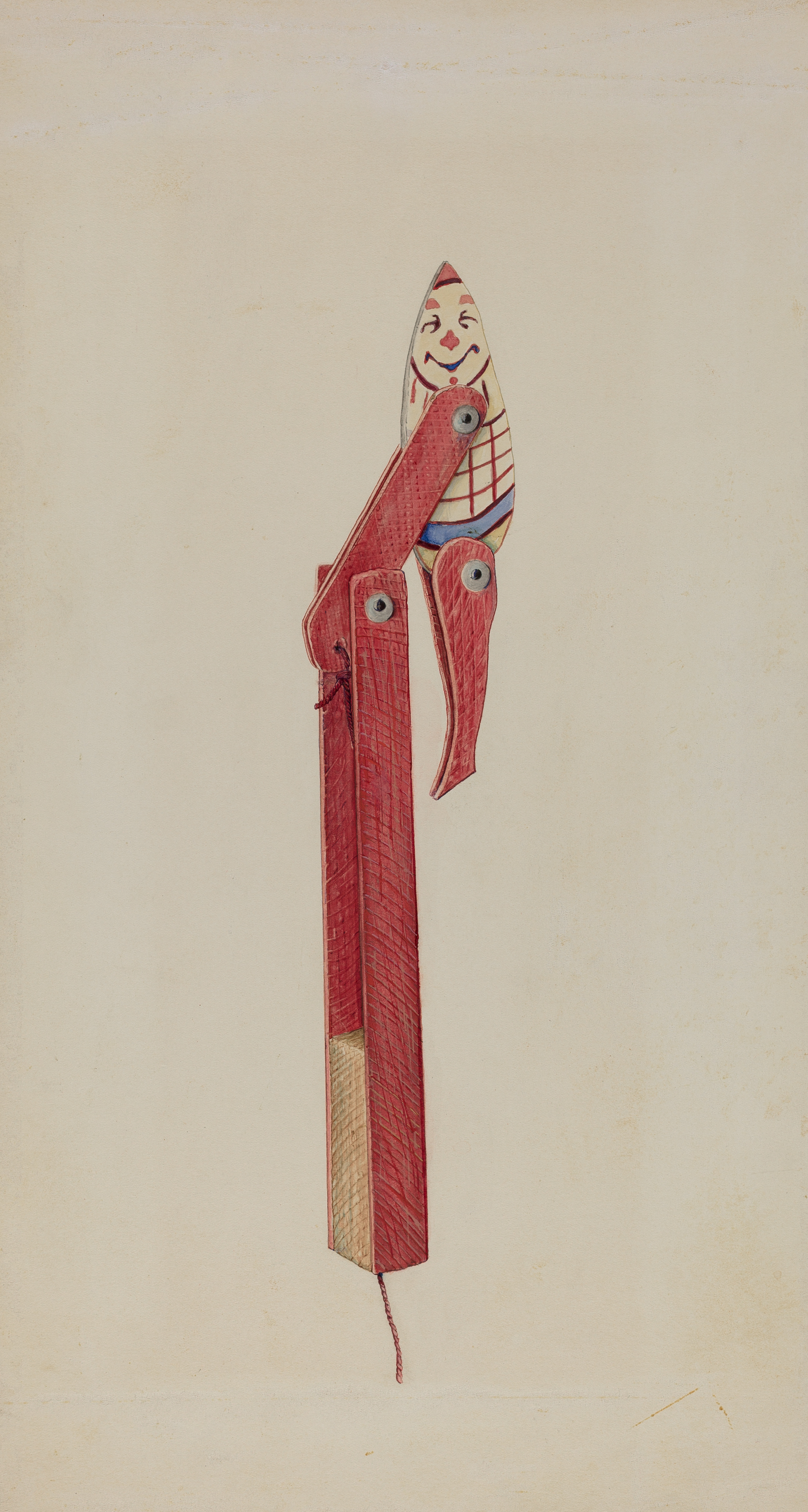
Robert Gilson, "Humpty Dumpty" Jumping Jack, 1935-1942, National Gallery of Art

The jumping jack is a jointed, flat wooden figure, a cross between a puppet and a paper doll that is considered a mechanical toy. The figure's joints are connected to a pull string that causes the arms and legs to move up and down when the string is pulled and released. Jumping jacks were popular in many contemporary countries including England, France, and Germany, but similar mechanical toys date back to the Ancient Egyptians.

== History ==
Although the jumping jack is popularly thought of as a European toy, such mechanical toys have a long history that dates back to Ancient Egyptian toy figures with movable limbs. Among the earliest-known examples are ivory dancing figures, made to spin by pulling their strings that were among artifacts found at the archaeological site, El-Lisht.

=== Pantin ===
In France jumping jacks were especially popular and generally known as “pantins”. In the mid-1700s, “pantins” were popular among the French nobility, and versions were sold that satirized famous figures of the time. Edmond Barbier wrote in 1747 that "one cannot go into any house without finding a pantin hanging by the mantelpiece".

=== Hampelmann ===
In 1832, Hampelmann was a character created by Carl Malß as a figure for the burlesque at Frankfurt. Later, jumping jacks became known as Hampelmann in German-speaking countries. The mechanical toys were manufactured in the Ore Mountains in Germany.

In her first year as a student at the famous Bauhaus design school in Dessau, Germany, Margaretha Reichardt, who would become a textile designer, undertook a preliminary course run by Josef Albers and László Moholy-Nagy in 1926. As part of the course she designed a modern version of the Hampelmann that was set in a wooden frame and featured articulated limbs that move when a string is pulled. Later, her design was produced commercially by Naef, a Swiss toy company.

=== Quockerwodger ===
Oxford Reference cites the word "quockerwodger" as "a wooden puppet which can be made to 'dance' by pulling its strings". By analogy, quockerwodger came to be used as a negative appellation for a politician whose "strings" are pulled entirely by their own "puppetmaster".

== See also ==
- Push Puppet
