= Adolf Friedrich Hesse =

German organist and composer

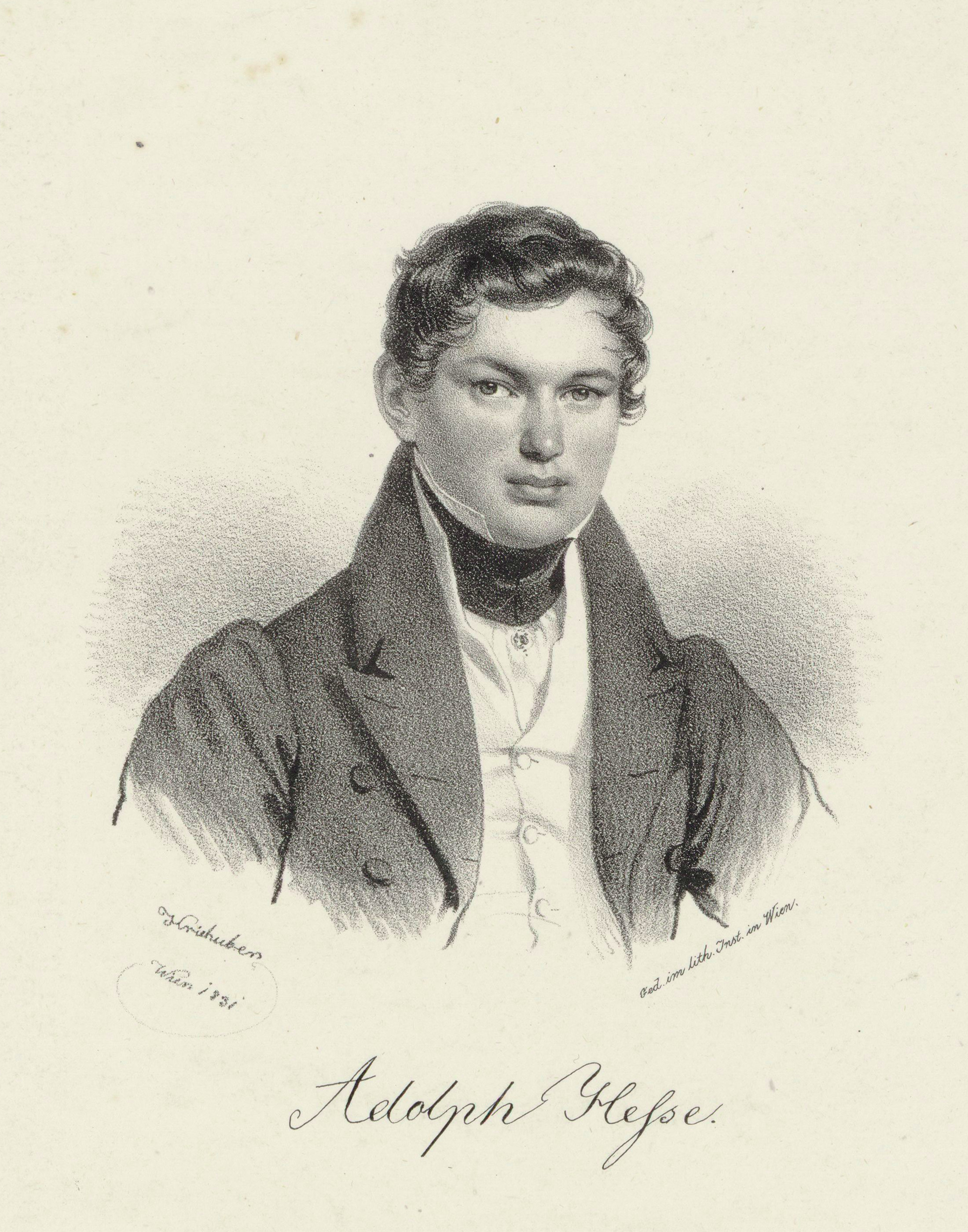
Adolf Friedrich Hesse, 1831

Adolf Friedrich Hesse (30 August 1809 – 5 August 1863) was a German organist and composer.

== Life ==
Hesse was born and died in Breslau. He studied in his home town with the organists Friedrich Wilhelm Berner and Ernst Köhler (1799–1847). He was taught within the Bach tradition of Silesia. On his first concert tour in Germany he met the organist Christian Heinrich Rinck, with whom he returned to study for six months in 1828-1829: Rinck was a student of Johann Christian Kittel, who in turn was a student of Johann Sebastian Bach. In 1831, he became the principal organist at the Bernhardinerkirche in Breslau. Considered one of the most important organists in Germany, his virtuosic playing and agile pedalwork dazzled audiences in Paris, where he played an all-Bach programme—a novelty in France—for the inauguration of the organ at Saint-Eustache in 1844; and in London, where he played at Crystal Palace during the Great Exhibition of 1851. Back in Breslau, he conducted the symphonic concerts of the city's Opera Orchestra. One of Hesse's pupils was the Belgian organist Jacques-Nicolas Lemmens, who would later teach Alexandre Guilmant and Charles-Marie Widor.

== Works for organ ==
Dates of publication with publisher where known. Os. = "Orgelsachen" [organ matters]

- Präludium für die Orgel, in C minor (Os. 1) (1829, Förster)
- Leichtes Präludium (Os. 3) (1829, Förster)
- Fuga aus Mozart's Requiem und Präludium als Einleitung zu derselben (Os. 4) (1829, Leuckart)
- Praeludium über 2 Themata aus Graun's Der Tod Jesu zum Choral "O Haupt voll Blut und Wunden" (Os. 5) (1829, Leuckart)
- Leichte Orgelvorspiele (Os. 6) (1829, Leuckart)
- 12 Studien (Os. 7) (1830, Förster)
- Choral: "Wer nur den lieben Gott läßt walten" mit Veränderungen (Os. 8) (1830)
- Nützliche Gabe (Os. 10) (1830, Förster)
- Fantasie in C minor, Op. 22 (Os. 11)(1831, Förster)
- 9 leichte Orgelvorspiele, Op. 24 (Os. 11) (1831, Leuckart)
- 12 leichte Orgelvorspiele verschiedenen Charakters zum Gebrauch beim öffentlichen Gottesdienste, Op. 25 (Os. 12) (1831, Förster)
- 3 ausgeführte Choräle, 1 Praeludium, 1 Postludium und 1 Fuge, Op. 26 (Os. 13)
- 8 Orgelvorspiele, Op. 27 (Os.14)
- Orgel-Vorspiele, zum Gebrauch beim öffentlichen Gottesdienste, Op. 28 (Os. 15) (1831, André)
- Orgel-Vorspiele, zum Gebrauch beim öffentlichen Gottesdienste, Op. 29 (Os. 16) (1831, André)
- 8 Studien für die Orgel, Op. 30 (Os. 16)
- 18 Leichte Orgelvorspiele, Op. 31 (Os. 17) (1831, Cranz)
- Orgel-Vorspiele, Op. 32 (Os. 18)
- Orgel-Vorspiele, Op. 33 (Os. 19)
- Variationen über ein Original Thema in A♭ major, Op. 34 (Os. 20) (1832, Haslinger)
- Fantasie für die Orgel zu 4 Händen in C minor, Op. 35 (Os. 21) (1832, Haslinger)
- 3 Praeludien, 1 Trio und 1 Fantasie für das Concert, Op. 36 (Os. 22)
- 3 Praeludien, 1 Postludiem, 1 Fugue und 1 variirten Choral, Op. 37 (Os. 23)
- Zwei Fugen nebst Einleitung, Op. 39 (Os. 24)
- Orgel-Vorspiele, Op. 40 (Os. 25)
- 8 Orgel-Vorspiele, Op. 42 (Os. 26) (1833, Hofmeister)
- Variationen (No. 2) über ein Original Thema für die Orgel in A major, Op. 47 (Os. 27)
- Orgel-Vorspiele verschiedene Charakters, Op. 48 (Os. 28)
- 8 instructive Orgelstücke, Op. 51 (Os. 29) (1834, Cranz))
- Fantasie für die Orgel nebst Präludium und Fuge über den Namen "Hesse", op. 52 (Os. 30)
- 5 Vorspiele und 1 variirter Choral, Op. 53 (Os. 31)
- Variationen über den Choral: 'Sei Lob und Ehr dem höchsten Gut' und Postludien, Einleitung und Fuge im Bach'schen Style, Op. 54 (Os. 32) (1837)
- Sixth Fantasie nebst 1 variirten Chorale und 2 Vorspielen, Op. 57 (Os. 33)
- 6 Orgel-Stücke verschiedenen Charakters, Op. 58 (Os. 34) (1836, Hofmeister)
- 7 Orgelstücke, Op. 60 (Os. 35)
- 2 Fugen nebst Einleitung für volle Orgel und 3 Vorspiele für sanfte Stimmen, Op. 62 (Os. 35)
- 4 Orgelstücke, Op. 63 (Os. 36)
- Praeludium und Fuga in D minor, Op. 66 (Os. 37) (1841, Breitkopf)
- God save the King! zum Gebrauch bei Orgel-Concerten bearbeitet, Op. 67 (Os. 38)
- 6 Orgel-Compositionen : 1 Vorspiel in C dur, 2 Fugen in F und B dur für volle Orgel, nebst 3 Vorspielen in C moll, D moll und Es dur für sanfte Stimmen, Op. 70 (Os. 39)
- 6 Orgel-Compositionen : eine Fuge in C moll, ein fugirtes Choral-Vorspiel in A moll und ein Nachspiel in G dur für volle Orgel : nebst 3 Vorspielen in F dur, E moll und E dur für sanfte Stimmen, Op. 71 (Os. 40)
- Fantasie und Fuge in D major, Op. 73 (Os. 41)
- 3 Präludien, 1 Trio, Choral-Prelude Aus tiefer Noth, Op. 74 (Os. 42), on Aus tiefer Not
- Fantasie für die Orgel, Op. 76 (Os. 43) (1851, Bote und Bock)
- 6 Orgelstucke, Op. 77 (Os. 44) (1851, Bote und Bock)
- 5 Orgelstücke, Op. 81 (Os. 45)
- Fantasia Sonata in C & 2 Preludes, Op. 83 [Os. 46]
- Einleitung zu Graun's "Tod Jesu", E♭ minor, Op. 84 (Os. 47)
- Toccata in A♭, Op. 85 (Os. 48)
- Präludium und Fuge in B minor, Op. 86 (Os. 49)
- Fantasia zu 4 Händen in D minor, Op. 87 (Os. 50)

== Notes ==
Sources

- Riemann, Hugo (1901). Geschichte der Musik seit Beethoven. Leipzig.
- Weyer, Martin (2001). "Hesse, Adolf Friedrich". Grove Music Online (8th ed.). Oxford University Press. doi:10.1093/gmo/9781561592630.article.12939. ISBN 978-1-56159-263-0. (subscription, Wikilibrary access, or UK public library membership required)
