= Ein Heldenleben =

Symphonic poem by Richard Strauss

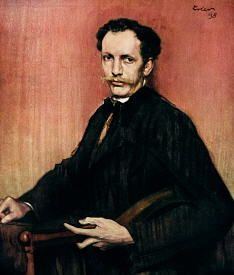
Strauss, 1898 portrait by Fritz Erler

Ein Heldenleben (A Hero's Life), Op. 40, is a tone poem by Richard Strauss. The work was completed in 1898. It was his eighth work in the genre, and exceeded any of its predecessors in its orchestral demands. Generally agreed to be autobiographical in nature despite contradictory statements on the matter by the composer, the work contains more than thirty quotations from Strauss's earlier works, including Also sprach Zarathustra, Till Eulenspiegel, Don Quixote, Don Juan, and Death and Transfiguration.

== Background ==
Strauss began work on the piece while staying in a Bavarian mountain resort in July 1898. He proposed to write a heroic work in the mould of Beethoven's Eroica Symphony: "It is entitled 'A Hero's Life', and while it has no funeral march, it does have lots of horns, horns being quite the thing to express heroism. Thanks to the healthy country air, my sketch has progressed well and I hope to finish by New Year's Day."

Strauss worked on Ein Heldenleben and another tone poem, Don Quixote, during 1898. He regarded the two as complementary, saying they were conceived as "direct pendants" to one another. There was speculation before the premiere about the identity of the hero. Strauss was equivocal: he commented "I'm no hero: I'm not made for battle", and in a programme note he wrote that subject of the piece was "not a single poetical or historical figure, but rather a more general and free ideal of great and manly heroism." On the other hand, in the words of the critic Richard Freed:

The music, though, points stubbornly to its own author as its subject, and Strauss did concede, after all, in a remark to the writer Romain Rolland, that he found himself "no less interesting than Napoleon," and his gesture of conducting the premiere himself instead of leaving that honor to the respected dedicatee [i.e., Willem Mengelberg] may well be viewed as further confirmation of the work's self-congratulatory character.

== Structure and analysis ==
The work, which lasts about 50 minutes, is through-composed: performed without breaks, except for a dramatic grand pause at the end of the first movement. The movements are titled as follows (later editions of the score may not show these titles, owing to the composer's request that they be removed):

1. "Der Held" (The Hero)
2. "Des Helden Widersacher" (The Hero's Adversaries)
3. "Des Helden Gefährtin" (The Hero's Companion)
4. "Des Helden Walstatt" (The Hero at Battle)
5. "Des Helden Friedenswerke" (The Hero's Works of Peace)
6. "Des Helden Weltflucht und Vollendung" (The Hero's Retirement from this World and Completion)

Ein Heldenleben employs the technique of leitmotif that Richard Wagner used, but almost always as elements of its enlarged sonata-rondo symphonic structure.

=== I. "Der Held" ===
The first theme represents the hero. In unison, horns and celli play E♭ major triads ascending through an almost three-octave span. A contrasting lyrical theme first appears in high strings and winds in B major. A second motive appears, outlining a stepwise descending fourth. Trumpets sound a dominant seventh chord followed by a grand pause, the only prolonged silence throughout the entire piece.

=== II. "Des Helden Widersacher" ===
The movement opens with chromatic woodwinds and low brass: multiple motives in contrasting registers are heard. The adversaries represented by the woodwinds are Strauss's critics, such as the 19th-century Viennese music critic Doktor Dehring, who is memorably written into the score with an ominous four note leitmotif played by the tuba and tenor tuba in parallel fifths. As the critic Michael Kennedy puts it, the Hero's theme goes dolefully into the minor and the critics renew their attacks until a fanfare from the brass diminishes them.

=== III. "Des Helden Gefährtin" ===
Strauss was evasive about whether he was or was not the hero depicted in the piece, but he explicitly confirmed that the hero's companion was a portrait of his wife, Pauline de Ahna. He wrote to Rolland, "She is very complex, a trifle perverse, a trifle coquettish, never the same, changing from minute to minute." The section features a tender melody played by a solo violin. In an extended accompanied cadenza filled with extremely detailed performance instructions by Strauss, after the fashion of an operatic recitative, the violin presents new motivic material, alternating with brief interjections in low strings, winds, and brass. During this section, the violin briefly foreshadows a theme that will appear fully later. The cadenza concludes and the new thematic material is combined in a cantabile episode commencing in G♭. Fragments of the motives from the previous movement briefly appear. The section ends with "a voluptuously scored love-scene".

The academic and critic James Hepokoski observes that the whole work is in a massive version of sonata form. The three initial sections comprise an elaborate exposition, with elements of a multiple-movement symphony evident in their contrasting character and tempo. The remainder of the work comprises development, recapitulation, and coda, with occasional new thematic material.

=== IV. "Des Helden Walstatt" ===
In this first extended development section of the work, percussion and a solo trumpet are heard in the first appearance of 3/4 time: a variation of a previous motive. A fanfare motive in offstage trumpets, is heard which is repeated onstage again later in the movement. The sequence of clamorous trumpet fanfares occurs as the music approaches a harmonic climax in G♭, and the related E♭ minor. Percussion is pervasive throughout the movement. 4/4 time returns in a modified recapitulation of the first theme as it appeared at the beginning of the piece, this time with a repeated quaver accompaniment. A new cantabile theme makes its appearance in the trumpet, and an extended elaboration of this serves to preface the next section.

=== V. "Des Helden Friedenswerke" ===
Yet another new motive appears, commencing in a rapid descending E♭ triad, which introduces a new development of the original theme: an elegy featuring harp, bassoon, English horn, and strings. The autobiographical aspect of the work is indicated most clearly in this section, in which Strauss extensively quotes his previous works. He quotes his early opera Guntram (eight times), his symphonic poems Don Quixote (five times), Don Juan (four), Death and Transfiguration (four), Macbeth (three), Also sprach Zarathustra (three) and Till Eulenspiegel (once). The lieder "Traum durch die Dämmerung", Op 29/1 and "Befreit", Op 39/4, are quoted once each. The melodies lead into the final section.

=== VI. "Des Helden Weltflucht und Vollendung" ===
The reappearance of the previous "Hanslick" motive brings in an agitato episode. This is followed by a pastoral interlude with what Kennedy calls "a bucolic cor anglais theme". The descending triad now appears slowly, cantabile, as the head of a new, peaceful theme in E♭: this is the theme foreshadowed during the violin cadenza. In a final variation of the initial motive, the brass intones the last fanfare, and a serene E♭ major conclusion is reached, signaling the Hero's completion and fulfillment.

== Instrumentation ==
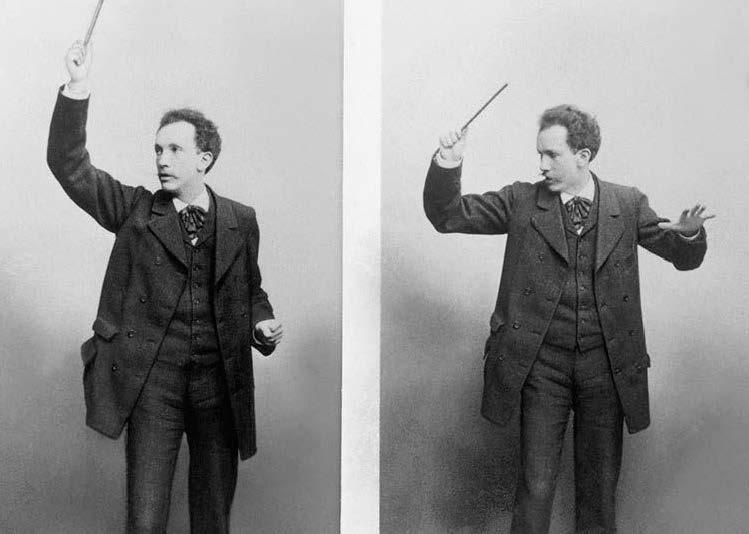
Strauss conducting (circa 1900)

The work is scored for a large orchestra consisting of piccolo, three flutes, three oboes, cor anglais (doubling fourth oboe), E♭ clarinet, two soprano clarinets, bass clarinet, three bassoons, contrabassoon, eight horns in F, E and E♭, three trumpets in B♭ (briefly used offstage) and two trumpets in E♭, three trombones, tenor tuba in B♭, tuba, timpani, bass drum, two snare drums, cymbals, tenor drum, tam-tam, triangle, two harps, and strings, including an extensive solo violin part.

In one section, the second violins are called on to play a G♭ or F♯ which is a semitone below the normal range of the instrument, and which can only be accomplished by temporarily retuning their lowest string.

== Dedication and performances ==
Strauss dedicated the piece to the 27-year-old Willem Mengelberg and the Concertgebouw Orchestra. However, it was premiered by the Frankfurter Opern- und Museumsorchester on March 3, 1899 in Frankfurt, with the composer conducting. The first American performance was a year later, performed by the Chicago Symphony, conducted by Theodore Thomas. The work did not reach England until December 6, 1902, when the composer conducted Henry Wood's Queen's Hall Orchestra.

Béla Bartók wrote a piano reduction of the piece in 1902, performing it on January 23, 1903, in Vienna. The conductor Joolz Gale was more recently given permission to arrange the work for chamber orchestra, which was commissioned and premiered by ensemble mini on October 16, 2014, in Berlin.

== Reception ==
The German critics responded to Strauss's caricatures of them. One of them called the piece "as revolting a picture of this revolting man as one might ever encounter". Otto Floersheim wrote a damning review in the Musical Courier (April 19, 1899), calling the "alleged symphony ... revolutionary in every sense of the word". He continued, "[t]he climax of everything that is ugly, cacophonous, blatant and erratic, the most perverse music I ever heard in all my life, is reached in the chapter 'The Hero's Battlefield'. The man who wrote this outrageously hideous noise, no longer deserving of the word music, is either a lunatic, or he is rapidly approaching idiocy." The critic in The New York Times after the New York premiere in 1900 was more circumspect. He admitted that posterity might well mock his response to the piece, but that although "there are passages of true, glorious, overwhelming beauty ... one is often thrown into astonishment and confusion". Henry Wood, with whose orchestra Strauss gave the British premiere, thought the piece "wonderfully beautiful".

In modern times, the work still divides critical opinion. According to Bryan Gilliam in the Grove Dictionary of Music and Musicians, this is "mainly because its surface elements have been overemphasized." In Gilliam's view:

Various critics see the work as a flagrant instance of Strauss's artistic egotism, but a deeper interpretation reveals the issue of autobiography to be far more complex. Ein Heldenleben treats two important subjects familiar from earlier works: the Nietzschean struggle between the individual and his outer and inner worlds, and the profundity of domestic love.

Whatever the critics might have thought, the work rapidly became a standard part of the orchestral repertoire. It has been performed 41 times at the BBC Proms since its premiere there in 1903, most recently in 2026 by the Met Orchestra with Yannick Nézet-Séguin.

== Recordings ==
There are many recordings of Ein Heldenleben, with three conducted by the composer himself. Important recordings include the following:

Orchestra	Conductor	Date	Label
Staatskapelle Berlin	Richard Strauss	1926	Classical Recordings Quarterly
New York Philharmonic	Willem Mengelberg	1928	Pearl Records
Bayerisches Staatsorchester	Richard Strauss	1941	Deutsche Grammophon; Dutton Vocalion
NBC Symphony Orchestra	Arturo Toscanini	1941	RCA; Naxos Historical
Royal Concertgebouw Orchestra	Willem Mengelberg	1942	Teldec; Naxos Historical
Wiener Philharmoniker	Richard Strauss	1944	Preiser Records
Royal Philharmonic Orchestra	Sir Thomas Beecham	1947	Testament; Biddulph
Pittsburgh Symphony Orchestra	Fritz Reiner	1947	RCA
Wiener Philharmoniker	Clemens Krauss	1952	Decca
Minneapolis Symphony Orchestra	Antal Doráti	1953	Mercury; Pristine Classics
Chicago Symphony Orchestra	Fritz Reiner	1954	RCA
Staatskapelle Dresden	Karl Böhm	1957	Deutsche Grammophon
Berliner Philharmoniker	Herbert von Karajan	1959	Deutsche Grammophon
Philadelphia Orchestra	Eugene Ormandy	1959	CBS
Royal Philharmonic Orchestra	Sir Thomas Beecham	1959	EMI (stereo)
Philadelphia Orchestra	Eugene Ormandy	1960	Sony Classical
San Francisco Symphony	Pierre Monteux	1960	RCA
London Symphony Orchestra	Sir John Barbirolli	1969	EMI
Los Angeles Philharmonic	Zubin Mehta	1969	Decca
Royal Concertgebouw Orchestra	Bernard Haitink	1970	Philips
London Symphony Orchestra	Sir John Barbirolli	1970	BBC Classics (live recording)
Staatskapelle Dresden	Rudolf Kempe	1972	EMI
Berliner Philharmoniker	Herbert von Karajan	1974	EMI
Wiener Philharmoniker	Karl Böhm	1975	Deutsche Grammophon
Wiener Philharmoniker	Sir Georg Solti	1978	Decca
Philadelphia Orchestra	Eugene Ormandy	1980	RCA
Cleveland Orchestra	Vladimir Ashkenazy	1984	Decca
Berliner Philharmoniker	Herbert von Karajan	1985	Deutsche Grammophon
Wiener Philharmoniker	André Previn	1988	Telarc
Staatskapelle Dresden	Giuseppe Sinopoli	1992	Deutsche Grammophon
Cleveland Orchestra	Christoph von Dohnányi	1992	Decca
Wiener Philharmoniker	Carlos Kleiber	1993	Sony (unreleased)
San Francisco Symphony	Herbert Blomstedt	1994	Decca
Minnesota Orchestra	Eiji Oue	1998	Reference Recordings
Philadelphia Orchestra	Wolfgang Sawallisch	1996	Warner Classics
Symphonieorchester des Bayerischen Rundfunks	Lorin Maazel	1999	RCA Red Seal
Czech Philharmonic	Vladimir Ashkenazy	2000	Exton
WDR Symphony Cologne	Semyon Bychkov	2001	Avie
Chicago Symphony Orchestra	Daniel Barenboim	2003	Erato /Warner Classics
Tonhalle-Orchester Zürich	David Zinman	2003	Arte Nova Classics
Royal Concertgebouw Orchestra	Mariss Jansons	2004	RCO Live
Berliner Philharmoniker	Sir Simon Rattle	2005	EMI
Wiener Philharmoniker	Christian Thielemann	2006	Deutsche Grammophon
Staatskapelle Dresden	Fabio Luisi	2007	Sony
Pittsburgh Symphony Orchestra	Manfred Honeck	2008	Exton
Philharmonia Orchestra	Christoph von Dohnányi	2009	Signum Records
Chicago Symphony Orchestra	Bernard Haitink	2010	CSO Resound
Rotterdam Philharmonic Orchestra	Yannick Nézet-Séguin	2011	BIS
Frankfurter Opern- und Museumsorchester	Sebastian Weigle	2013	OehmsClassics
Bavarian Radio Symphony Orchestra	Mariss Jansons	2015	BR Klassik
Melbourne Symphony Orchestra	Andrew Davis	2016	ABC Classics
Munich Philharmonic Orchestra	Valery Gergiev	2017	MPHIL
