= Friedrich Wilhelm Berner =

German organist and composer

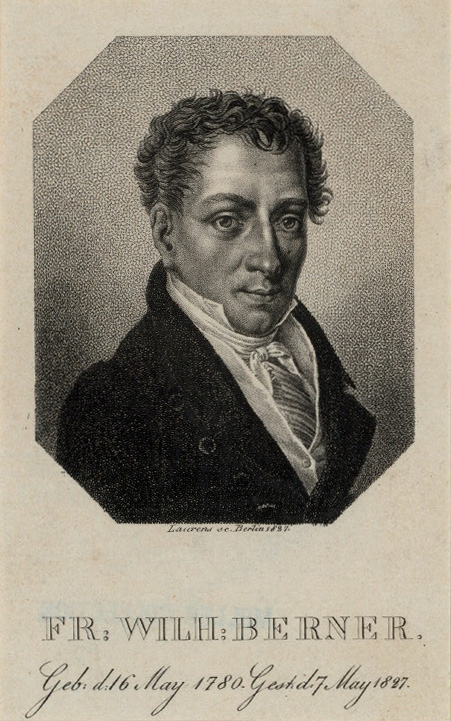
Portrait by Johann Daniel Laurenz the younger (1827)

Friedrich Wilhelm Berner (16 March 1780 – 9 May 1827) was a German organist, composer, teacher and writer on music theory.

== Life ==
Berner was born at Breslau (now Wrocław) in 1780. His father Johann Georg Berner, the organist of St Elizabeth's Church there, gave him early music lessons, and aged thirteen Friedrich was appointed his assistant. He studied counterpoint and composition from Franz Gehirne, the director of the choir at St Matthew's Church in Breslau, and also studied the cello, horn, bassoon, and clarinet; from about 1796 to 1804 he was clarinettist in the theatre orchestra in Breslau. In 1800 he went to Halle to hear Daniel Gottlob Türk's lectures.

Carl Maria von Weber arrived in Breslau in 1804 to take the post of music director at the theatre, and they had a friendly relationship.

In 1811 Berner and Josef Schnabel were sent to Berlin by Carl Friedrich Zelter to assess the Singakademie, with the view of establishing similar institutions in Breslau and the rest of Silesia.

In Breslau, he was involved in improving musical conditions. He was music director at the university, principal organist at St Elizabeth's Church, and was teacher and co-director with Josef Schnabel of the newly founded Royal Academic Institute for Church Music, which was connected to the university and under Carl von Winterfeld's supervision. He had many students, including the organist and composer Adolf Friedrich Hesse.

He became ill with a chest ailment, and after several years of ill health, he died in Breslau on 9 May 1827. Arrey von Dommer wrote: "His organ style was far simpler, larger, and richer in content than his father's; the thoroughness and artful execution of his free fantasies, his extemporization of fugues and his skill in free choral figuration were highly praised."

== Works ==
He left many compositions both for voices and instruments. He also wrote Grundregeln des Gesanges ("Basic rules of the song"; 1815), Theorie der Choral-zwischenspiel ("Theory of the choral prelude"; 1819) and Die Lehre von den musikalischen Interpunktion ("Advice on musical punctuation"; 1821).
