= Carl Malß =

German writer and theatre director

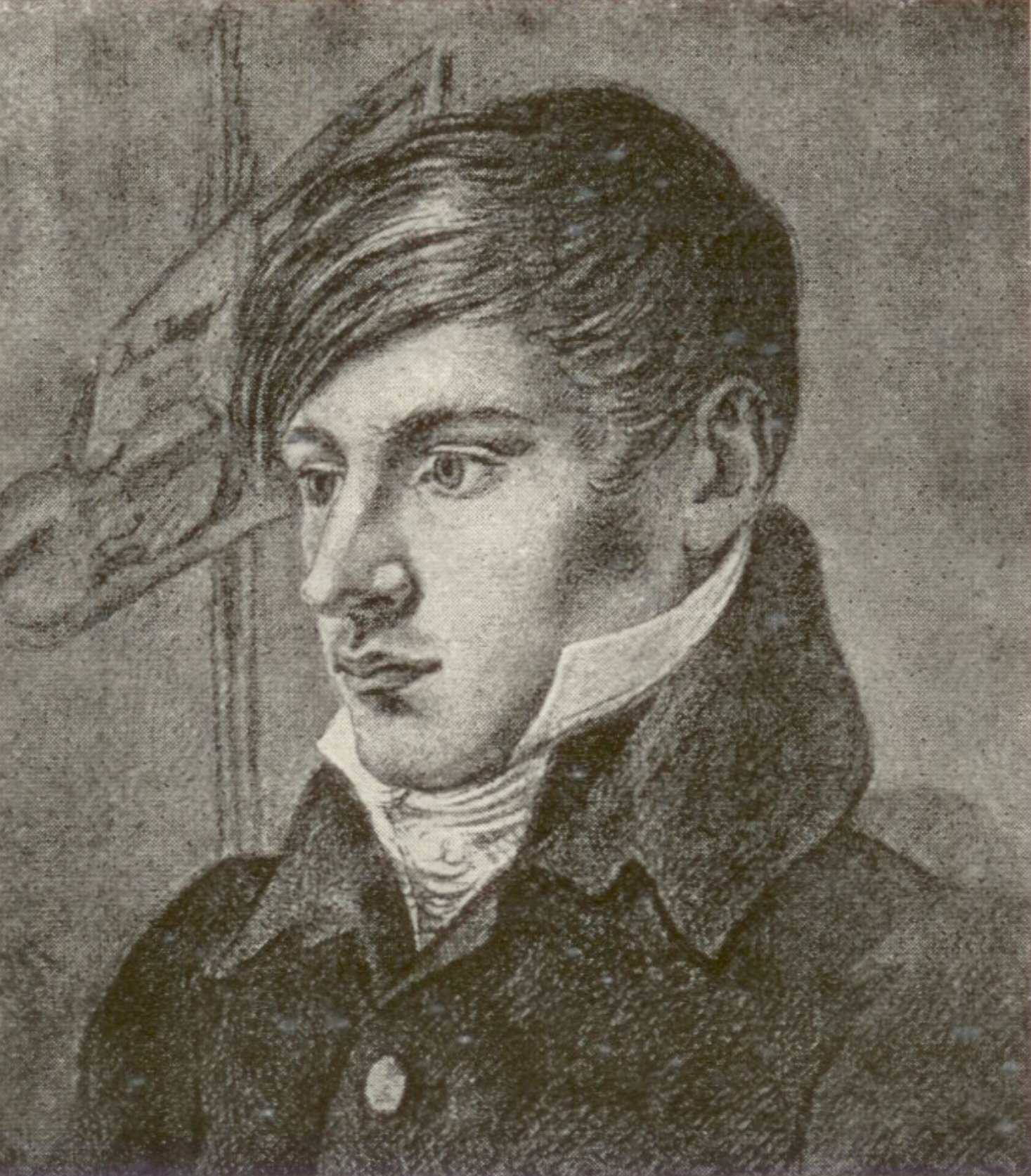
Carl Balthasar Malß

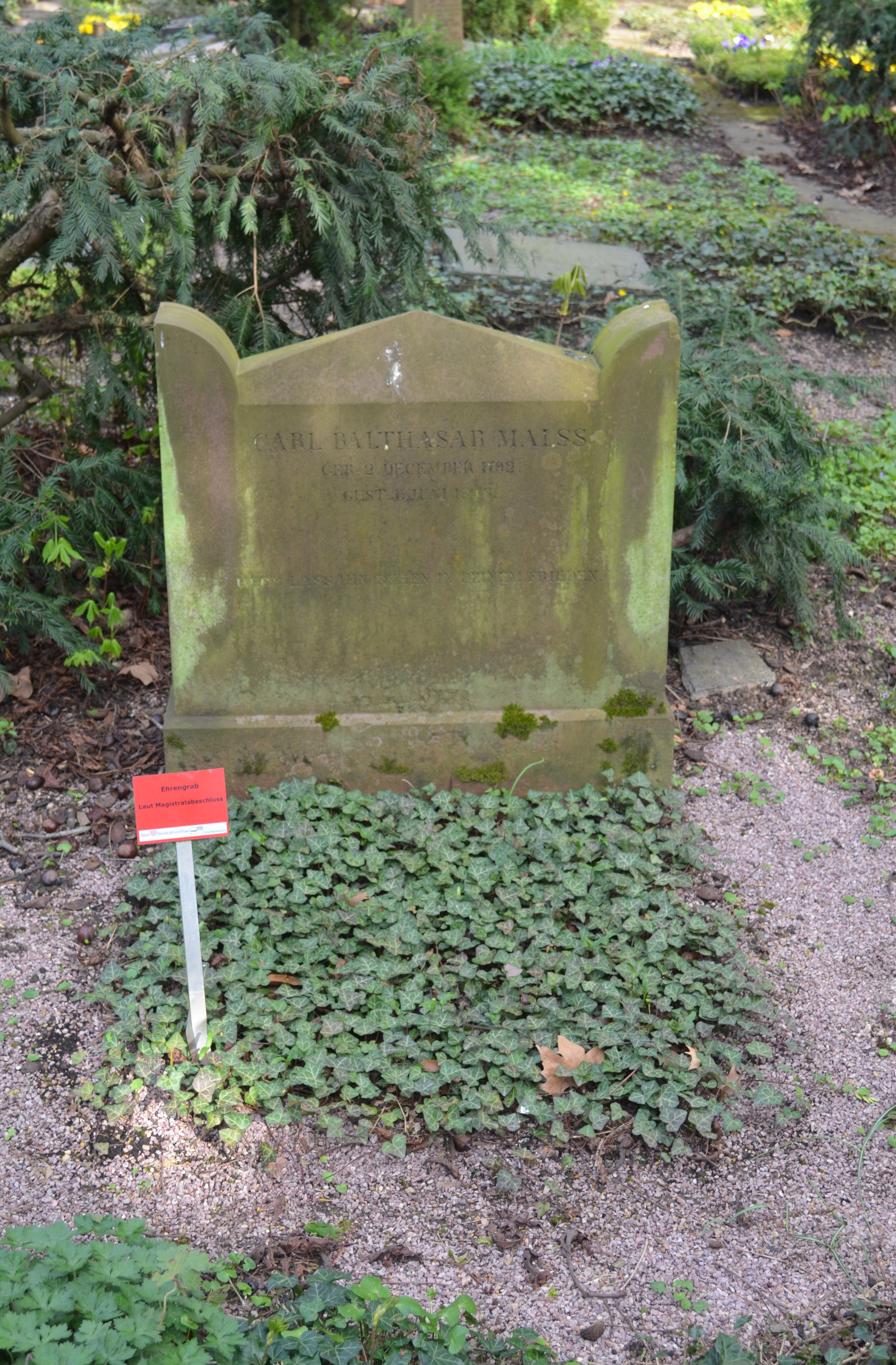
Grave of Carl Malß in the Frankfurt main cemetery

Carl Balthasar Malß (5 December 1792 – 3 June 1848) was a German poet, architect and theatre director.

== Life ==
Born in Frankfurt, Malß completed a commercial apprenticeship in Lyon and took part as military volunteer in the camp against France 1814/15. After his return, he became an architect, but then he turned to the theatre. In 1820, his comedy "Die Entführung oder der alte Bürger-Capitain, ein frankfurter Heroisch-Borjerlich Lustspiel in zwei Aufzügen" was printed for the first time and premiered on 13 August 1821 at the Frankfurt theatre with Samuel Friedrich Hassel in the title role. It was the first publicly performed play in Frankfurt dialect and was very successful with the audience. Hassel played the role for over 45 years until 26 March 1866 without the slightest change.

Johann Wolfgang Goethe "highly recommended" the play, which Malß expressed as follows in the preface to the fourth edition published in 1833.

"To the hot mer from a reliable source that aach the old Mr. Geethé driwwer laughed". (?)

Ludwig Börne called the Bürgerkapitän a true masterpiece; the faithfulness to nature cannot be taken any further".

The Bürgerkapitän is still occasionally performed today. Of Malß' six other plays, the Frankfurter Lokal-Skizze in vier Bildern Herr Hampelmann oder Die Landpartie nach Königstein, written in 1832, has remained on stage to this day. Both plays already belonged to the repertoire of the Volkstheater Frankfurt which opened in 1971.

Because of the great success of the Landpartie, he had the plays Herr Hampelmann im Eilwagen (Hampelmanniade in Sechs Bilder) and "Herr Hampelmann sucht ein Logis in 1833/34. (Local comedy in five pictures) follow. They made the term jumping jack proverbial, so that it soon became native to the rest of Germany.

Together with Carl Guhr and Leonhard Meck, Malß was one of the tenants of the Schauspiel Frankfurt. In desperation over the financial shortage of the theatre, he took his own life on 3 June 1848. According to other sources, he died of the consequences of his asthma. He was buried at the Frankfurt Main Cemetery.

Carl Malß died in Frankfurt at the age of 55.

A street in the Dichterviertel in the Frankfurt district Dornbusch was named after Malß. He was a member of the Frankfurt masonic lodge "Zur Einigkeit".

== Work ==
- Die Entführung oder der alte Bürger-Capitain, ein frankfurter Heroisch-borgerlich Lustspiel in zwei Aufzügen. Nebst erläuterndem Anhang. Friedrich, Frankfurt, 1821. (Numerized der 3. Aufl. 1829)
- Stelldichein im Tivoli, oder Schuster und Schneider als Nebenbuhler. Localposse mit Gesang in zwei Acten. Sauerländer, Frankfurt, 1832. Premiere: Frankfurt, 9 April 1832. (Numerized)
- Herr Hampelmann oder Die Landparthie nach Königstein. Varrentrapp, Frankfurt, 1833. Uraufführung: Frankfurt, 26 November 1832. (Numerized der 3. Aufl. 1836)
- Herr Hampelmann im Eilwagen. Hampelmanniade in 6 Bildern. Premiere: Frankfurt, 30 December 1833.
- Herr Hampelmann sucht ein Logis. Lokal-Lustspiel in fünf Bildern. Varrentrapp, Frankfurt, 1834. premiere: Frankfurt, 2 February 1834. (Numerized)
- Die Landparthie nach Königstein. Frankfurter Lokal-Skizze in Vier Bildern. Varrentrapp, Frankfurt, 1834. (Numerized)
- Die Jungfern Köchinnen. Lokalpose in einem Act. Varrentrapp, Frankfurt,. 1837. Premiere: Frankfurt, 16 February 1835. (Numerized der 2. Aufl. 1837)

The pieces appeared individually in several editions. A complete edition first appeared in Frankfurt in 1850, including a Wörterbuch der Frankfurter Mundart.
