= Thomas Guggeis =

German conductor and pianist

- Born: 1993 (age 32–33); Dachau, Bavaria, Germany
- Education: Hochschule für Musik und Theater München; Conservatorio Giuseppe Verdi
- Occupation: Conductor
- Organizations: Staatsoper Berlin; Staatsoper Stuttgart; Oper Frankfurt

Thomas Guggeis (born 16 August 1993) is a German conductor and pianist. He is Generalmusikdirektor of the Oper Frankfurt.

== Life and career ==
Born on 16 August 1993 in Dachau, Bavaria, Guggeis studied conducting at the Hochschule für Musik und Theater München and the Conservatorio Giuseppe Verdi in Milan. He also received a bachelor's degree in quantum mechanics. He began his professional career as repetiteur at the Staatsoper Berlin, where he was an assistant of Daniel Barenboim. He was internationally recognized there when he stepped in at short notice to conduct Salome by Richard Strauss.

Guggeis received the Förderpreis of the Ritter-Stiftung in Straubing in 2014, and was nominated for the Deutscher Dirigentenpreis in 2017. He was Kapellmeister at the Staatsoper Stuttgart from the 2018/19 season, where he conducted operas such as Puccini's La Bohème and Madama Butterfly, Rossini's Il barbiere di Siviglia, Henze's Der Prinz von Homburg and Weber's Der Freischütz. He conducted for the first time at the Theater an der Wien in Vienna in 2019, a new production of Weber's Oberon.

Guggeis returned to the Staatskapelle Berlin in 2020, and was awarded the title Staatskapellmeister, as the youngest conductor to date. He led there Ariadne auf Naxos by R. Strauss and Mozart's Die Zauberflöte, followed after a break due to the COVID-19 pandemic by Verdi's Falstaff.

Guggeis made his conducting debut at the Oper Frankfurt in June 2021, in a production of Ariadne auf Naxos. In October 2021, Oper Frankfurt announced the appointment of Guggeis as its next Generalmusikdirektor (GMD) in Frankfurt, effective with the 2023–2024 season, with an initial contract of five years. In October 2026, Oper Frankfurt announced the extension of Guggeis' contract as GMD through August 2032.

In 2026, Guggeis was awarded 'Conductor of the Year' by the opera magazine Opernwelt.

== See also ==
- Frankfurter Opern- und Museumsorchester

Cultural offices
Preceded by Sebastian Weigle	General Music Director, Frankfurt Opera; 2023–present	Succeeded by incumbent
