= Josef Schnabel =

German composer, church musician and choir director

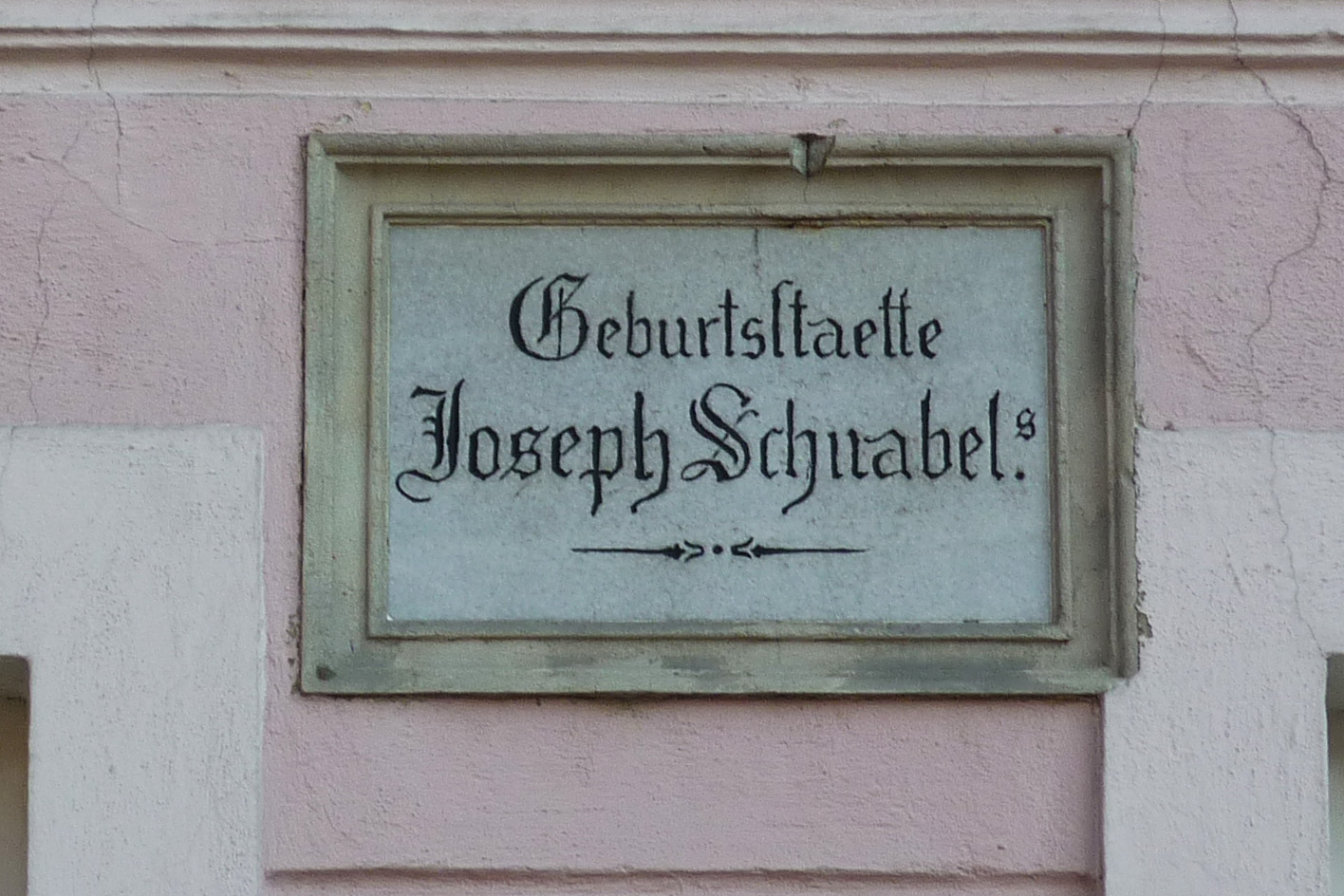
Plaque at his birthplace in Naumburg

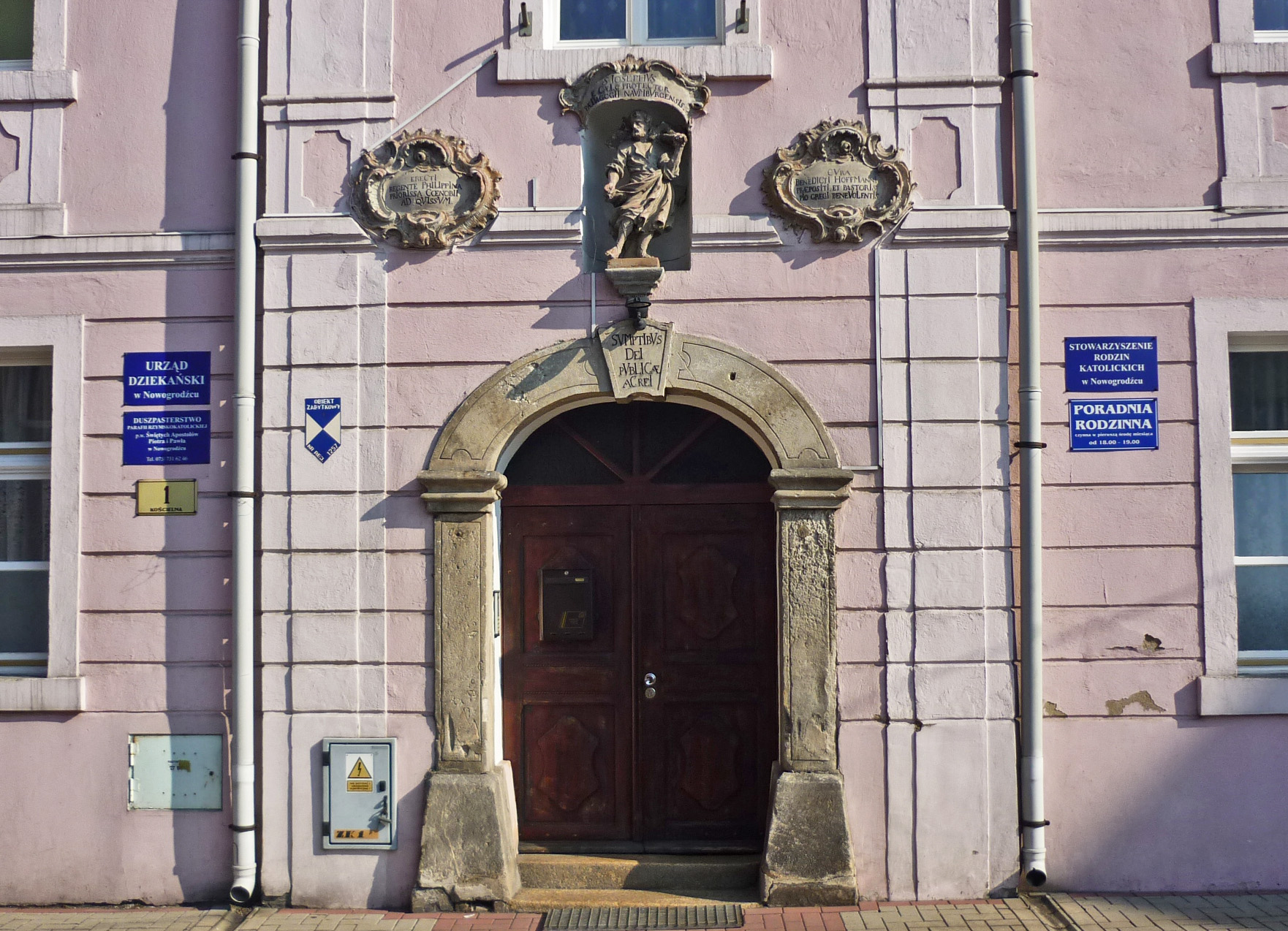
The family home

Joseph Ignaz Schnabel (24 May 1767 – 16 June 1831) was a German composer and church musician.

== Life ==
He was born in Naumburg am Queis in Silesia, now in Poland. He came from a family of musicians and was taught early on by his father. As a child he was a chorister of Vincent Church in Breslau (today Wrocław, Poland). From the age of 12 he attended the Matthias Gymnasium because he wanted to become a priest. However chronic ear-ache developed after he fell into some water and he was considered to be no longer suitable for a priest's life. After he left the Gymnasium he began teacher-training. In 1790 he became a school-master. He was noticed because of the good music performances of his pupils.

From 1797 he worked as a violinist at the Vincenzkirche in Breslau and later as an organist at St. Klara. In 1798 he became a violinist and concertmaster in Breslau's theatre orchestra. On April 1, 1805 he was its Director of Music. In 1812 he became the Director of Music at the university, also teaching at the Catholic seminary and was also director of the Royal Institute of Sacred Music. In 1819 he founded the Association of Sacred Music at the university with Friedrich Wilhelm Berner and Johann Theodor Mosewius. Schnabel was awarded the honorary doctorate in 1823.

His son Joseph Schnabel, who also composed, was an organist and music teacher in Glogau.

He died on 16 June 1831 in Breslau.

== Compositions ==
Schnabel's compositional work consisted mainly of instrumental church music. He established an especially Silesian tradition, also known as the Breslau School. Schnabel's most famous work is based on material that he found in the archives of the Wrocław cathedral by an unknown composer of the early 18th century, the piece is known as Transeamus usque Bethlehem and this is now part of the standard repertoire of many church choirs.

- Herr, unser Gott!
- Four Hymns for vespers
- Inclina Domine
- Missa in E/A
- Mass in F minor
- Mass in G
- Graduale: Natum vidimus
- Transeamus usque Bethlehem (arrangement)

In addition to church music, Schnabel composed military music, songs for male quartets, a clarinet concerto and a quintet for string quartet and guitar.
