= Op. 48 =

In music, Op. 48 stands for Opus number 48. Compositions that are assigned this number include:

- Beethoven – "Gellert Lieder", which includes "Die Himmel rühmen des Ewigen Ehre", a setting for voice and piano of Die Ehre Gottes aus der Natur
- Chopin – Nocturnes, Op. 48
- Draeseke – Quintet for Piano, Strings and Horn
- Dvořák – String Sextet
- Fauré – Requiem
- Glazunov – Symphony No. 4
- Hovhaness – Lousadzak
- MacDowell – Indian Suite
- Milhaud – L'Homme et son désir
- Schumann – Dichterliebe
- Sibelius – The Captive Queen (Vapautettu kuningatar), cantata for male or mixed choir and orchestra (1906, arranged 1910)
- Strauss – Freundliche Vision
- Tchaikovsky – Serenade for Strings
- Weber – Grand Duo Concertant
