= Freundliche Vision =

Lied and poem

- Lied by Richard Strauss
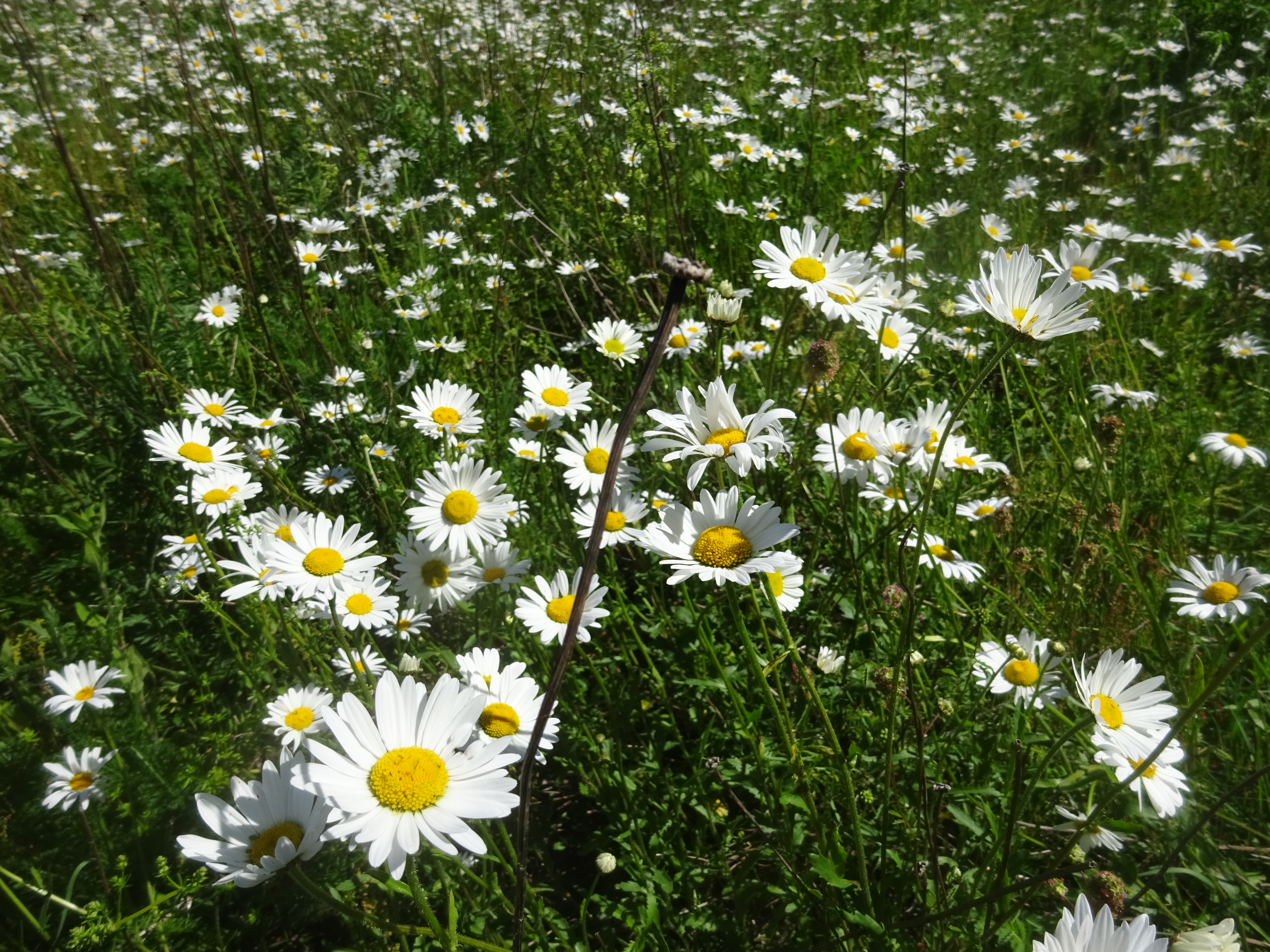
- A meadow full of daisies, as the text mentions
- English: Welcome Vision
- Opus: 48/1
- Text: poem by Otto Julius Bierbaum
- Language: German
- Composed: 1900
- Published: 1901
- Scoring: voice and piano (or orchestra, 1918)

"Freundliche Vision" (which has been translated as "Welcome Vision", but can also be read as "Pleasant Daydream") is both a German poem by Otto Julius Bierbaum and a Lied (art song) by Richard Strauss, his Op. 48/1. The opening line is Nicht im Schlafe hab ich das geträumt ("I did not dream this while asleep"). It is the first of a set of five songs by Strauss composed in 1900 and published in Berlin in 1901 by Adolph Fürstner. The works were scored for voice and piano, and arranged for voice and orchestra in 1918 by the composer.

== Poem ==
Drawing of Otto Julius Bierbaum from 1897

"Freundliche Vision" first appeared in Irrgarten der Liebe (Maze of love) in Berlin and Leipzig in 1901. The full title of the collection of songs, poems and aphorisms is Der neubestellte Irrgarten der Liebe um etliche Gänge und Lauben vermehrt. Verliebte, launenhafte, moralische und andere Lieder, Gedichte u. Sprüche aus den Jahren 1885 bis 1905, where it appears in the section "Bilder und Träume" (Images and dreams).

Freundliche Vision
Nicht im Schlafe hab' ich das geträumt,
Hell am Tage sah ich's schön vor mir:
Eine Wiese voller Margeritten;
Tief ein weißes Haus in grünen Büschen;
Götterbilder leuchten aus dem Laube.
Und ich geh' mit Einer, die mich lieb hat,
Ruhigen Gemütes in die Kühle
Dieses weißen Hauses, in den Frieden,
Der voll Schönheit wartet, daß wir kommen.
Und ich geh' mit einer, die mich lieb hat,
In den Frieden voll Schönheit.

Pleasant Daydream
Not in my sleep did I dream it,
Saw it in broad daylight lovely before me:
A meadow full of dill daisies,
A white house deep in greenery,
Godlike figures shining among the leaves.
And I go there with one who loves me,
Quiet of mind in the cool
Of this white house at peace,
Waiting full of beauty for us to come.
And I go with one who loves me,
Into the peace full of beauty.

== Composition history ==
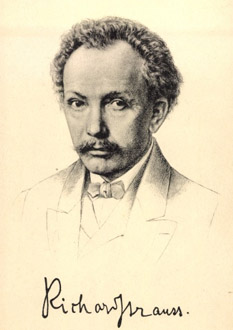
Strauss in 1900

Strauss composed "Freundliche Vision", along with the other four songs of Op. 48, in 1900. This song sets a poem by Otto Julius Bierbaum, while the other four set poems by Karl Henckell. Strauss composed art songs as a transition between working in instrumental music and opera; he wrote his first opera, Feuersnot, the same year.

He originally scored the five songs for voice and piano. The songs were published in 1901 by Adolph Fürstner. Strauss also made an arrangement for voice and orchestra in 1918. "Freundliche Vision" is among the songs that the composer presented in more than one program on tours of the US, in Carnegie Hall in 1904, and in 1921 in the Town Hall in two recitals.

Julius Patzak and the Bavarian State Opera Orchestra broadcast a particularly noteworthy version, which is consistent with Strauss's “preference ... for fastish speeds without sentimentality.”

== Music ==
"Freundliche Vision" has features in common with "Traum durch die Dämmerung", also on a text by Bierbaum, including a shift of key, here to illustrate the contrast of sleeping and a vision while awake. Strauss repeats for the last two lines elements from before, Und ich geh' mit Einer, die mich lieb hat (And I walk with one who loves me), condensing the text that took three lines before to in den Frieden voll Schönheit (into the peace full of beauty), sung over a tonic pedalpoint in the same pattern as all of the song.

== By other composers ==
The poem "Freundliche Vision" also inspired other composers, such as Max Reger, who set lines 3 to 9 to music as No. 2 of his Zwölf Lieder, Op. 66, in 1902. Lutz Landwehr von Pragenau set the poem in 1979 for baritone and piano as his Op. 1/1 in Zwei Lieder für Bariton und Klavier.
