= Romans 10 =

- ← chapter 9 chapter 11 →
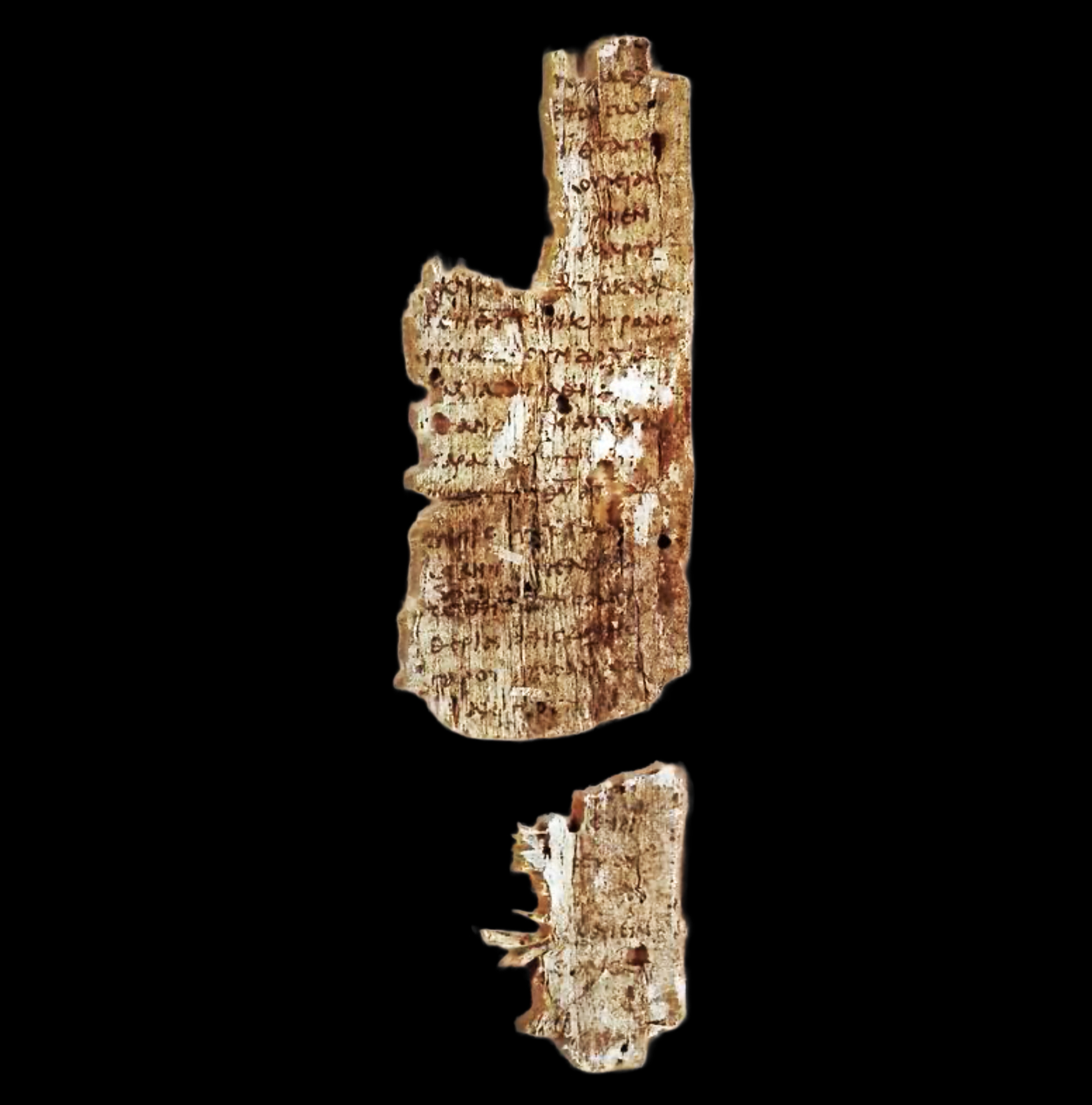
- Epistle to the Romans 8:12–27 in Papyrus 27 (recto side), written in the 3rd century
- Book: Epistle to the Romans
- Category: Pauline epistles
- Christian Bible part: New Testament
- Order in the Christian part: 6

Romans 10 is the tenth chapter of the Epistle to the Romans in the New Testament of the Christian Bible. It is authored by Paul the Apostle, while he was in Corinth in the mid-50s AD, with the help of an amanuensis (secretary), Tertius, who adds his own greeting in Romans 16:22.

Paul continues his discussion of Israel's rejection of God's purpose which he had commenced in chapter 9: despite his "anguish over Israel", it remains his "heart's desire and prayer to God for the Israelites, that they may be saved".

== Text ==
The original text was written in Koine Greek. This chapter is divided into 21 verses.

=== Old Testament references ===
- Romans 10:5 references Leviticus 18:5 and Ezekiel 20:11
- Romans 10:6 references Deuteronomy 30:12
- Romans 10:7 references Deuteronomy 30:13
- Romans 10:8 references Deuteronomy 30:14
- Romans 10:11 references Isaiah 28:16
- Romans 10:13 references Joel 2:32
- Romans 10:15 references Isaiah 52:7 and Nahum 1:15
- Romans 10:16 references Isaiah 53:1
- Romans 10:18 references Psalm 19:4
- Romans 10:19 references Deuteronomy 32:21
- Romans 10:20 references Isaiah 65:1
- Romans 10:21 references Isaiah 65:2

=== New Testament references ===
- Romans 10:5 references Galatians 3:12
- Romans 10:13 references Acts 2:21
- Romans 10:16 references John 12:38

== Zeal for God not based on knowledge ==
Paul asserts that those Jews who have not believed in Jesus Christ are "zealous for God, but their zeal is not based on knowledge" (Romans 10:2). The wording of the International Children's Bible reads "They really try to follow God. But they do not know the right way."

== Righteousness according to Moses ==
=== Verse 5 ===
For Moses writes about the righteousness which is of the law, "The man who does those things shall live by them."

— Romans 10:5, New King James Version

The quotation in Romans 10:5 is from Leviticus 18:5.

=== Verse 8 ===
But what does it say? "The word is near you, in your mouth and in your heart" (that is, the word of faith which we preach):

— Romans 10:8, New King James Version

The quotation in Romans 10:8 is from Deuteronomy 30:14.

=== Verse 9 ===
If you confess with your mouth the Lord Jesus and believe in your heart that God has raised Him from the dead, you will be saved.

— Romans 10:9, New King James Version

- The Lord Jesus": rendered in NET as "Jesus is Lord" or "the Lord." The Greek construction of κύριον, kurion, also in the quotation from Joel 2:32 in verse 13 (referring to the same "Lord"), suggests a reference to "Yahweh".

=== Verse 13 ===
For whosoever shall call upon the name of the Lord shall be saved.

— Romans 10:13, King James Version

The quotation in Romans 10:13 is from Joel 2:32. "The Lord", which originally refers to 'Yahweh', is assigned to Jesus in verse 9.

== Hearing and obeying the gospel ==
Using a series of prophetic quotations from Moses, Isaiah and Joel, Paul argues that faith comes through hearing and the gospel must be preached if it is to be heard and obeyed, but also that it was indeed made known to the people of Israel, who have refused to believe, and their disobedience and stubbornness was itself foretold in prophecy (Romans 10:14–21).

=== Verse 15 ===
And how shall they preach unless they are sent? As it is written: "How beautiful are the feet of those who preach the gospel of peace, who bring good news of good things!"

— Romans 10:15, Modern English Version

Romans 10:15 cites Isaiah 52:7.

== Uses ==
=== Music ===
The King James Version of verses 15 and 18 from this chapter is cited as texts in the English-language oratorio "Messiah" by George Frideric Handel (HWV 56).

== See also ==
- Christ
- Israel
- Isaiah
- Jesus
- Moses
- Related Bible parts: Leviticus 18, Deuteronomy 30, Deuteronomy 32, Psalm 19, Isaiah 28, Isaiah 52, Isaiah 53, Isaiah 65, Joel 2, Nahum 1

== Bibliography ==
- Coogan, Michael David (2007). Coogan, Michael David; Brettler, Marc Zvi; Newsom, Carol Ann; Perkins, Pheme (eds.). The New Oxford Annotated Bible with the Apocryphal/Deuterocanonical Books: New Revised Standard Version, Issue 48 (Augmented 3rd ed.). Oxford University Press. ISBN 9780195288810.
- Hill, Craig C. (2007). "64. Romans". In Barton, John; Muddiman, John (eds.). The Oxford Bible Commentary (first (paperback) ed.). Oxford University Press. pp. 1083–1108. ISBN 978-0199277186.
