= Holy Spirit in the Pauline epistles =

Appearance in the epistles

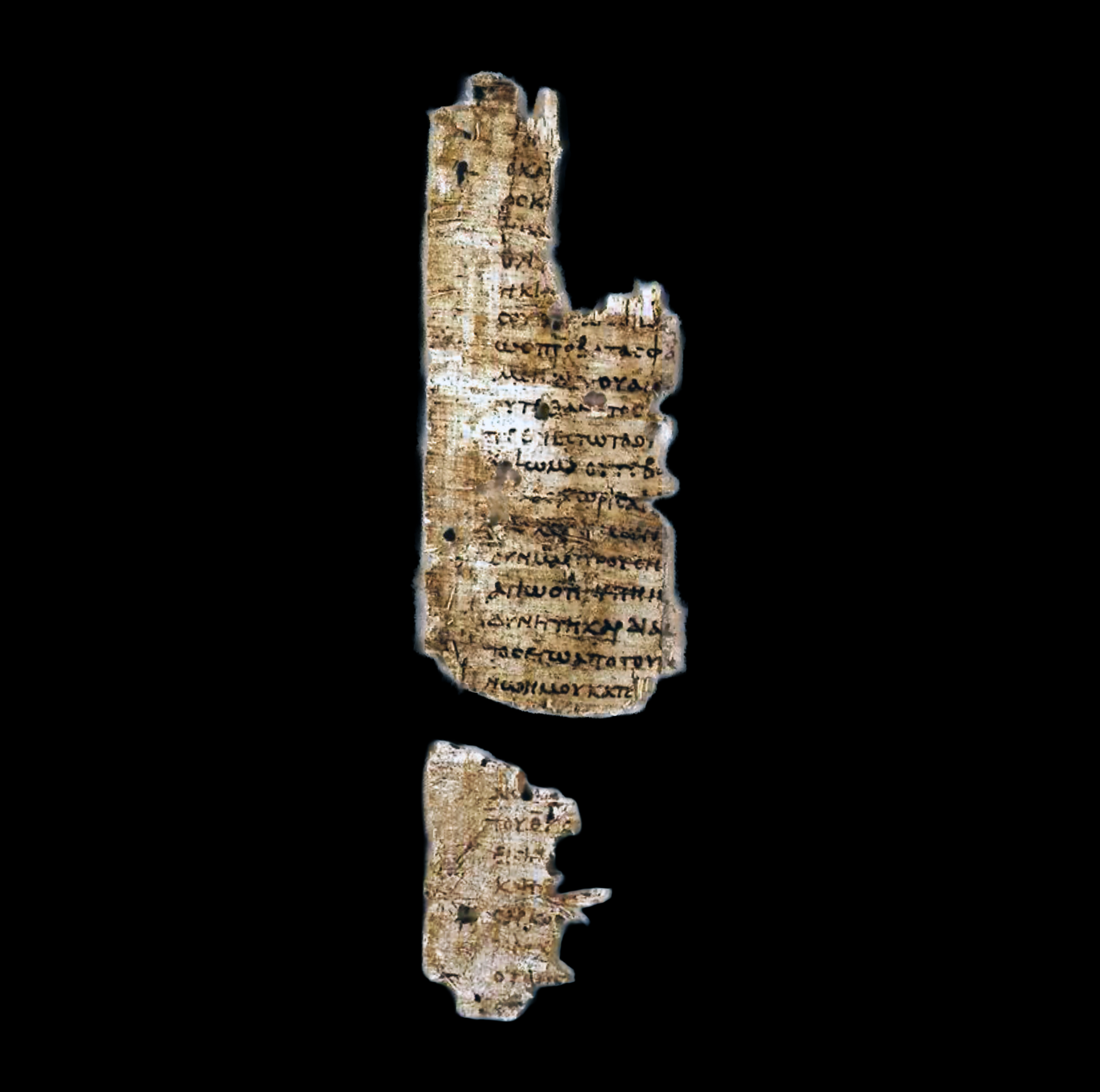
Part of Paul's Epistle to the Romans in Papyrus 27 early 3rd century

The Holy Spirit plays a key role in the Pauline epistles and Apostle Paul's pneumatology is closely connected to his theology and Christology, to the point of being almost inseparable from them.

== Bible source ==
The First Epistle to the Thessalonians, which was likely the first of Paul's letters, introduces a characterization of the Holy Spirit in 1:6 and 4:8 which persist throughout his epistles. In 1 Thessalonians 1:6 Paul refers to the imitation of Christ (and himself) and states: "And ye became imitators of us, and of the Lord, having received the word in much affliction, with joy of the Holy Spirit", whose source is identified in 1 Thessalonians 4:8 as "God, who giveth his Holy Spirit unto you".

These two themes of receiving the Spirit "like Christ" and God being the source of the Spirit persist in Pauline letters as the characterization of the relationship of Christians with God. For Paul the imitation of Christ involves readiness to be shaped by the Holy Spirit and as in Romans 8:4 and 8:11: "But if the Spirit of him that raised up Jesus from the dead dwelleth in you, he that raised up Christ Jesus from the dead shall give life also to your mortal bodies through his Spirit that dwelleth in you." The First Epistle to the Thessalonians also refers to the power of the Holy Spirit in 1:5, a theme which persists in other Pauline letters.
