= Herr, stärke mich, dein Leiden zu bedenken =

German hymn by Christian Fürchtegott Gellert

- Lutheran Passion hymn
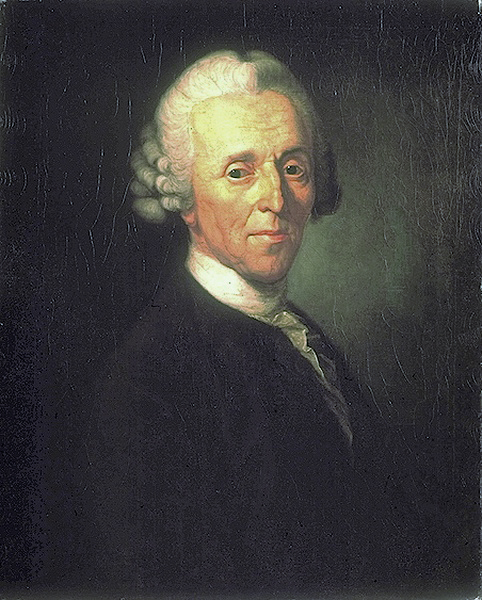
- Christian Fürchtegott Gellert
- English: Lord, strengthen me to reflect on your suffering
- Written: 1755
- Text: by Christian Fürchtegott Gellert
- Language: German
- Melody: "Herzliebster Jesu"
- Composed: 1534
- Published: 1757

"Herr, stärke mich, dein Leiden zu bedenken" (Lord, strengthen me to reflect on your suffering) is a Passion hymn in German, written by Christian Fürchtegott Gellert to the melody of "Herzliebster Jesu", and first published in 1757. It is contained in the German Protestant hymnal Evangelisches Gesangbuch and other collections.

== History ==
Gellert wrote "Herr, stärke mich, dein Leiden zu bedenken" in 1755. It appeared first in Leipzig in 1757 in his collection Geistliche Oden und Lieder, with 22 stanzas of four lines each, titled "Passionslied" (Passion song). As the first line indicates, it is a Passiontide prayer requesting strength to think about the suffering of Jesus. In the 1993 common Protestant hymnal, Evangelisches Gesangbuch, it appears shortened to ten stanzas and rearranged, as EG 91.

== Text and theme ==
Gellert's focus is a reflection on the Passion of Jesus, without description of the actions as narrated by the Evangelists. Speaking in the first-person singular, he contemplates its meaning for the individual believer, both theologically and emotionally. His theological thoughts are based on the Epistles of Paul. In accordance with the contemporary anthropology, he aims to educate both the mind towards wisdom and the heart towards virtue. In the spirit of the enlightenment, the poet's focus is on Jesus as a model for non-violence in his renunciation of retribution and intercession for his tormentors, aiming at reconciliation. Some wordings counter the "psalms of vengeance".

The format of the stanzas, with three long lines and a final short line, was based on the Sapphic stanza of Latin hymns. Beginning with a funeral song by Bartholomäus Ringwaldt from the 17th century, the format became associated with the topics of death, Passion and solace. Gellert succeeded mostly in filling the emphasized fourth line with meaning,

The text in the version of Evangelisches Gesangbuch is:

1) Herr, stärke mich, dein Leiden zu bedenken,
mich in das Meer der Liebe zu versenken,
die dich bewog, von aller Schuld des Bösen
uns zu erlösen.

2) Vereint mit Gott, ein Mensch gleich uns auf Erden
und bis zum Tod am Kreuz gehorsam werden,
an unsrer statt gemartert und zerschlagen,
die Sünde tragen:

3) welch wundervoll hochheiliges Geschäfte!
Sinn ich ihm nach, so zagen meine Kräfte,
mein Herz erbebt; ich seh und ich empfinde
den Fluch der Sünde.

4) Gott ist gerecht, ein Rächer alles Bösen;
Gott ist die Lieb und lässt die Welt erlösen.
Dies kann mein Geist mit Schrecken und Entzücken
am Kreuz erblicken.

5) Seh ich dein Kreuz den Klugen dieser Erden
ein Ärgernis und eine Torheit werden:
so sei's doch mir, trotz allen frechen Spottes,
die Weisheit Gottes.

6) Es schlägt den Stolz und mein Verdienst darnieder,
es stürzt mich tief und es erhebt mich wieder,
lehrt mich mein Glück, macht mich aus Gottes Feinde
zu Gottes Freunde.

7) Da du dich selbst für mich dahingegeben,
wie könnt ich noch nach meinem Willen leben,
und nicht vielmehr, weil ich dir angehöre,
zu deiner Ehre?

8) Ich will nicht Hass mit gleichem Hass vergelten,
wenn man mich schilt, nicht rächend wiederschelten,
du Heiliger, du Herr und Haupt der Glieder,
schaltst auch nicht wieder.

9) Unendlich Glück! Du littest uns zugute.
Ich bin versöhnt in deinem teuren Blute.
Du hast mein Heil, da du für mich gestorben,
am Kreuz erworben.

10) Wenn endlich, Herr, mich meine Sünden kränken,
so lass dein Kreuz mir wieder Ruhe schenken.
Dein Kreuz, dies sei, wenn ich den Tod einst leide,
mir Fried und Freude.

== Melody and musical setting ==
Gellert chose to write his poem to match the melody of the well-known hymn "Herzliebster Jesu", composed by Johann Crüger in 1640, which was based on a 1534 tune by Guilleaume Franc. Bach had included the first stanza of that hymn in his St Matthew Passion. Singers of Gellert's hymn would relate it to the context of the older hymn by Johann Heermann. The character of the melody has been described as "floating, bitter-sad, serious" ("schwebend, herb-traurig, ernst").

A four-part vocal setting by Carl Philipp Emanuel Bach, who set many songs from Gellert's collection to music in his Gellert Odes and Songs, was adapted for a publication by Carus-Verlag.
