= Traum durch die Dämmerung =

Song by R. Strauss on poem by Otto Julius Bierbaum

- Lied by Richard Strauss
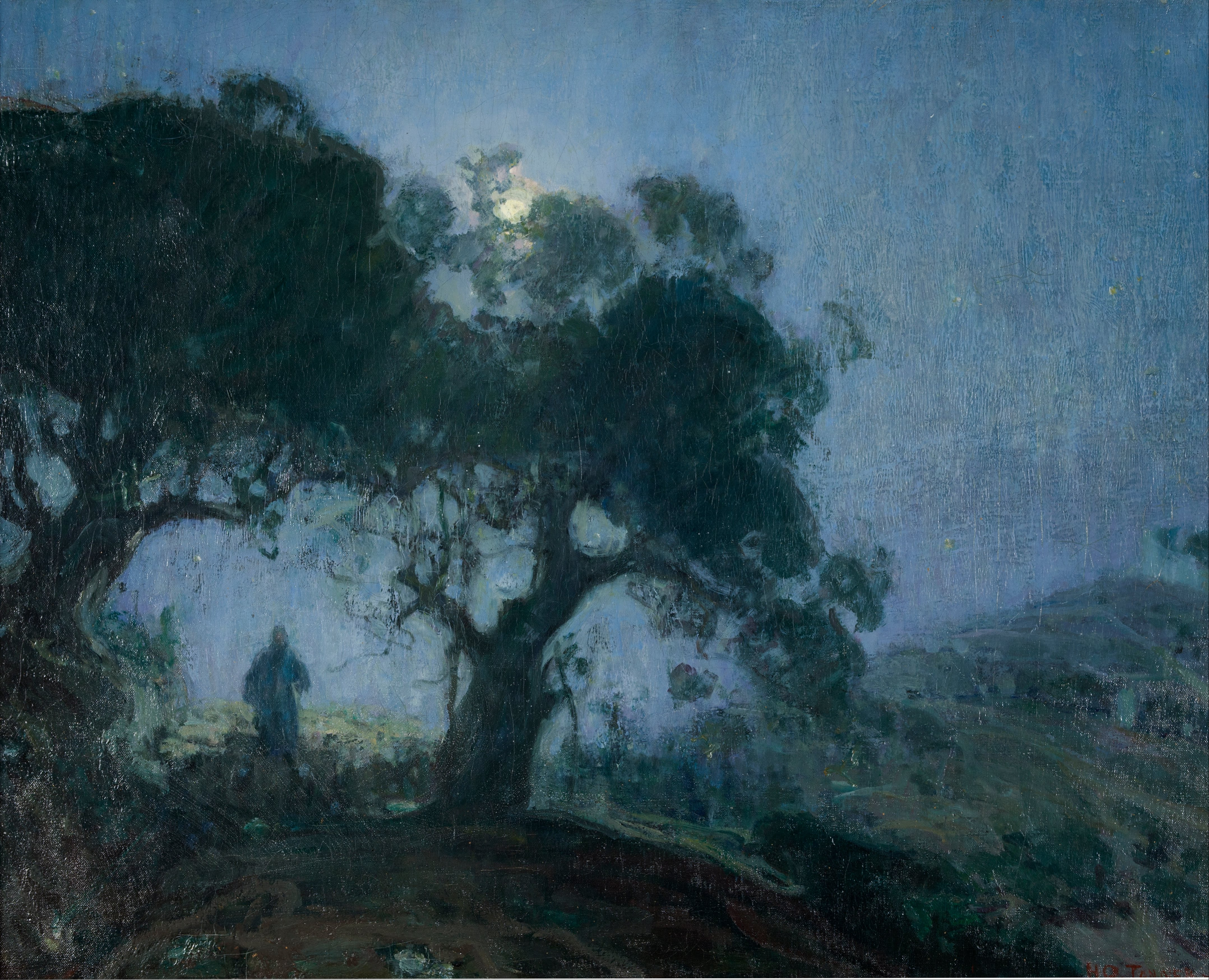
- The song on a love poem by Bierbaum describes a twilight which is similarly captured in a contemporary painting by Henry Ossawa Tanner, 1902
- English: Dream in the Twilight
- Opus: 29/1
- Text: Poem by Otto Julius Bierbaum
- Language: German
- Composed: 7 June 1895
- Dedication: Eugen Gura
- Scoring: Medium voice and piano

"Traum durch die Dämmerung" ("Dream in the Twilight", literally "Dream through the twilight"), is both a German poem by Otto Julius Bierbaum and a Lied (art song) by Richard Strauss, his Op. 29/1. The opening line is "Weite Wiesen im Dämmergrau" ("Broad meadows in grey dusk"). It is the first of three songs by Strauss based on love poems by Bierbaum, composed and published in Munich in 1895, and dedicated to Eugen Gura. The works were scored for medium voice and piano, and published by Universal Edition as 3 Lieder mit Klavierbegleitung (3 songs with piano accompaniment), later with English versions and orchestral arrangements.

== Poem ==
"Traum durch die Dämmerung" first appeared in Berlin in 1892 in a collection known as Erlebte Gedichte ("Experienced Poems") by Bierbaum that was published by Verlag von Wilhelm Issleib ("Wilhelm Issleib's Publishing House). Bierbaum dedicated the 217 page collection, with Traum durch die Dämmerung on page 130, to Detlev von Liliencron as he expressed in the personal foreword. A second edition of the collection appeared a year later.

In his anthology Lyrik des Jugendstils (Poetry of Art Nouveau) Jost Hermand noted that the title is paradigmatic for the literature of the Jugendstil. The theme is a man going to meet a beloved woman, as in Johann Wolfgang von Goethe's 1771 poem "Willkommen und Abschied" (Welcome and Farewell). In Bierbaum's poem, he speaks in the first person.

Drawing of Otto Julius Bierbaum from 1897

Traum durch die Dämmerung

Weite Wiesen im Dämmergrau;
Die Sonne verglomm, die Sterne ziehn;
Nun geh' ich hin zu der schönsten Frau,
Weit über Wiesen im Dämmergrau,
Tief in den Busch von Jasmin.

Durch Dämmergrau in der Liebe Land;
Ich gehe nicht schnell, ich eile nicht;
Mich zieht ein weiches, sammtenes Band
Durch Dämmergrau in der Liebe Land,
In ein blaues, mildes Licht.

"Traum durch die Dämmerung" is in two stanzas, each comprising five lines. The first line, literally: "Wide meadows in twilight grey", was translated by Richard Stokes as "Broad meadows in grey dusk". The first line rhymes with lines 3 and 4, in both stanzas on "dark" vowels, grau and Land, with line 4 repeating line 1. Line 2 rhymes with line 5 on a light vowel, ziehn and Licht. The term Dämmergrau, a combination of Dämmerung (twilight) and grau (grey), repeated four times (in lines 1 and 4) contrasts with the final word Licht (light). The third line of the poem describes the walk to meet the woman in first person, after detailing meadows, twilight, the sun and the stars: "Nun geh ich zu der schönsten Frau" (Now I go to the most beautiful woman). The subject notes that he is not in a rush: "Ich gehe nicht schnell" (I do not go fast). She is not described, but their relationship imagined as a "weiches, sammtenes Band" (soft, velvety band), drawing him to "der Liebe Land" (the love land), reaching a state of "mildes blaues Licht" (mild blue light).

== Composition and publication ==
Strauss composed all three songs of Op. 29 on one day, 7 June 1895, the year after he married Pauline de Ahna and settled in Munich, the town of his birth.

Working as assistant conductor at the Munich court opera, he looked for a librettist for a possible opera project and contacted Bierbaum. While no opera came to pass, Strauss liked his poems and set several of them to music, among them the three songs of Op. 29 which he all wrote on 7 June. "Traum durch die Dämmerung" was followed by "Schlagende Herzen" ("Longing Hearts" or "Beating Hearts") and "Nachtgang" (Nighttime Walk).

No.	Title	Incipit	Translation of Incipit
1	"Traum durch die Dämmerung"	"Weite Wiesen im Dämmergrau"	"Broad meadows in grey dusk"
2	"Schlagende Herzen"	"Über Wiesen und Felder ein Knabe ging"	"Over meadows and fields went a boy"
3	"Nachtgang"	"Wir gingen durch die stille milde Nacht"	"We walked through the gentle silent night"

Strauss reportedly completed "Traum durch die Dämmerung" in only 20 minutes his wife gave him before an errand. He scored the three songs, which all contemplate walking, for medium voice and piano, and dedicated them to Eugen Gura, a leading baritone of the court opera in Munich.

The songs were first published in Munich by Joseph Aibl. They were then published by Universal Edition. "Traum durch die Dämmerung" also appeared in English in a translation by John Bernhoff and Nelia Fabretto, in transpositions for low and high voice, and with an orchestral arrangement by Robert Heger. Strauss quoted the music, along with several other early works, in the fifth section of his tone poem Ein Heldenleben (A Hero's Life), Op. 40, completed in 1898, which is usually considered autobiographical in tone.

== Music ==
A typical performance takes around three minutes. In the version for medium voice, the music of "Traum durch die Dämmerung" begins in F-sharp major. It is in 2/4 time and marked "Sehr ruhig" (very calm). The two stanzas are through-composed, with two slight changes to the text: Strauss added the word "hin" to the third line and changed the order of the adjectives in the last line. The song is completed by a modified repeat of the last three lines, this time in Bierbaum's word order.

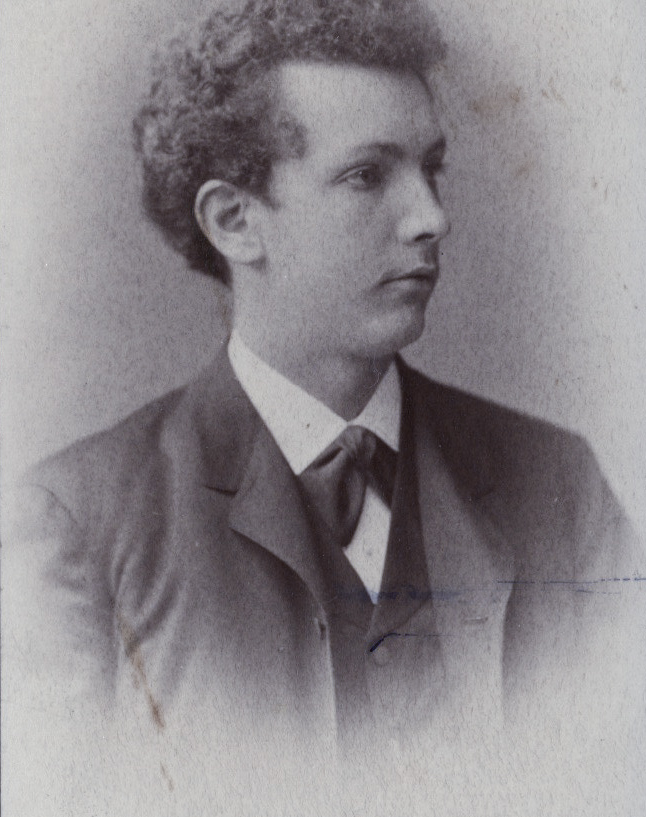
Richard Strauss in 1886

The even time picks up the slow steps. The general marking for volume is pp (very soft), repeated several times, changed by a crescendo marking only twice, both times going back to pp. The accompaniment follows a similar pattern almost throughout the song: in one measure, the bass in the pianists left hand moves in dotted eighth notes, while the right hand regularly alternates triplet sixteenths and eighths, resulting in a subtle shift of accents, which has been described as a "trance-like mood". The voice enters after two identical measures, also moving in dotted eighth notes. The first motif is a three note stepwise descent (A sharp, G sharp, F sharp). It is immediately repeated on the word "Dämmergrau". The text is mostly rendered simply, with only one note on each syllable. When the view changes in line 3 from observation of nature to the destination, the key shifts abruptly to B-flat major, and the word "schönsten" (most beautiful) is accented by a long high note. This climax of the first stanza is prepared by a crescendo, but again a sudden pianissimo. With the beginning of the second stanza, the key returns to F-sharp major, the melody is not identical but similar to the first stanza; the first motif appears one step higher, from B to G sharp, on "Dämmergrau", repeated on "Liebe Land". The line reaches a climax on "blaues" (blue). The text of the last three lines is repeated as a shortened version of a stanza, with the first motif in its second form this time on "gehe nicht schnell" and "eile nicht", with this emphasis on "not fast" marked "immer ruhiger (aber nicht schleppen)", which translates as "calmer and calmer (but no dragging)". The voice ends with a rising line, ending openly on C sharp, while the triplet movement stops, and the piano slowly repeats the final chord, marked ppp.

== Settings by other composers ==
The poem "Traum durch die Dämmerung" inspired several other composers. Max Reger set the text to music as No. 3 of his Six Songs for Medium Voice, Op. 35, in 1899. Wolfgang Jordan inserted a setting to conclude Träume. Acht Lieder für 1 Singstimme mit Pianoforte (Dreams. Eight songs for voice with piano), published in Berlin in 1899 by Deneke. "Traum durch die Dämmerung" was composed by Alfred von Sponer as the second of Drei Lieder für 1 mittlere Singstimme mit Pianofortebegleitung (Three songs for medium voice and piano accompaniment), Op. 12, published in Leipzig in 1899 by Rieter-Biedermann. Vítězslav Novák included a composition of the text in Erotikon, Op. 46 No. 2, published in 1912. Lutz Landwehr von Pragenau set it for baritone and piano as Op. 1/2 in 1979.
