= Psalm 19 =

Biblical psalm

- "The heavens declare the glory of God"
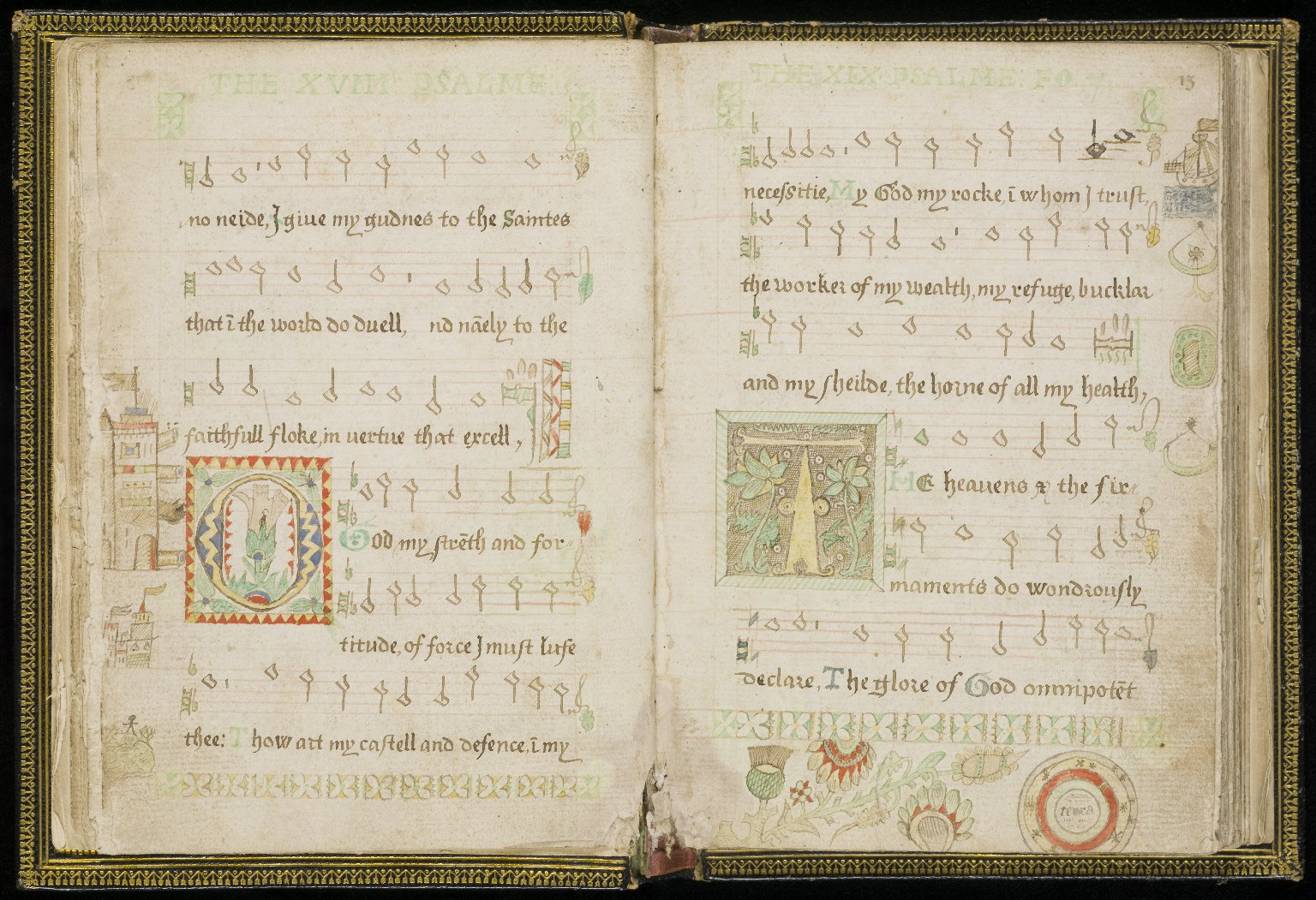
- Psalm 19 in a Scottish Metrical Psalter
- Other name: Psalm 18; "Caeli enarrant gloriam Dei"; "Die Himmel erzählen die Ehre Gottes"
- Text: Attributed to David
- Language: Hebrew (original)

Psalm 19
- ← Psalm 18 Psalm 20 →
- Book: Book of Psalms
- Hebrew Bible part: Ketuvim
- Order in the Hebrew part: 1
- Category: Sifrei Emet
- Christian Bible part: Old Testament
- Order in the Christian part: 19

Psalm 19 is the 19th psalm in the Book of Psalms, beginning in English in the King James Version: "The heavens declare the glory of God; and the firmament sheweth his handywork." In the slightly different numbering system used in the Greek Septuagint and Latin Vulgate translations of the Bible, this psalm is Psalm 18. The Latin version begins "Caeli enarrant gloriam Dei". The psalm is attributed to David.

The psalm considers the glory of God in creation, and moves to reflect on the character and use of "the law of the LORD". Psalm 1, this psalm and Psalm 119 have been referred to as "the psalms of the Law". It forms a regular part of Jewish, Catholic, Anglican, Eastern Orthodox Church and Protestant liturgies and psalmody. It has often been set to music, notably by Heinrich Schütz, by Johann Sebastian Bach who began a cantata with its beginning, by Joseph Haydn, who based a movement from Die Schöpfung on the psalm, and by Beethoven, who set a paraphrase by Gellert in "Die Himmel rühmen des Ewigen Ehre". Jean-Joseph Cassanéa de Mondonville wrote a grand motet Caeli enarrant in 1750 and François Giroust in 1791.

== Commentary ==
The classical Jewish commentators all point to the connection the psalmist makes between the Sun and the Torah. These connections include:

- The Torah enlightens man, just as the sun lights his way (Rashi)
- Both the sun and the Torah testify to the glory of their Creator (Ibn Ezra and Radak)
- The Torah is more perfect, whole, or complete than the powerful sun (Metzudat David)
- While the sun conveys God's glory and greatness in the physical world, the Torah expresses God's glory in the spiritual realm (Malbim).

According to the Baptist preacher Charles Spurgeon, this psalm compares and contrasts "the study of God's two great books—nature and Scripture". Explaining the emphasis on the heavens, Spurgeon explains, "The book of nature has three leaves, heaven, earth, and sea, of which heaven is the first and the most glorious…” Beginning in verse 7 (KJV), the psalmist then extols the perfection of the law of Moses and "the doctrine of God, the whole run and rule of sacred Writ".

John Mason Good theorizes that this psalm was composed either in the morning or around noon, when the bright sun eclipses the other heavenly bodies; he contrasts this with Psalm 8, in which the psalmist contemplates the starry sky in the evening. Praising the poetry of this psalm, 20th-century British writer C. S. Lewis is quoted as saying: "I take this to be the greatest poem in the Psalter and one of the greatest lyrics in the world".

On the matter of unity, Artur Weiser states that the first part (verses 1 to 7) are a completely distinct song from the second (verses 8 to 15). He upholds that not only the subjects, but also the metrics, the language and the tone are distinct and the two parts could not have been composed by the same author. Lewis, on the other hand, indicates nature as "an index, a symbol, a manifestation, of the Divine" and he points that here "the searching and cleansing sun becomes an image of the searching and cleansing Law", on which he suppresses the idea of these two subjects not being correlated. Rav Elchanan Samet identifies the same problems that Weiser did: "These two halves are strikingly different from one another in their content as well as in their style, to the point that it is difficult to point to verbal, stylistic, or conceptual connections between them." Nonetheless, he points that these two parts have been in unity since the Septuagint and agrees with it, "the inclination to adopt this [critical] solution is liable to stem from intellectual laziness."

Concerning Psalm 19's place in the architectural arrangement of the Psalms, Psalm 18 precedes Psalm 19, wherein David's adversaries are vanquished. Following this triumph and following Psalm 19, a succession of five royal Psalms, Psalms 20 through 24, according to O. Palmer Robertson, seemingly accentuating the unequivocal establishment of the Davidic kingdom

The centrality of Psalm 19 within a literary chiasm extending from Psalm 15 to Psalm 24 has been also expounded upon in Carissa Quinn's doctoral thesis.

== Text ==
The following table shows the Hebrew text of the Psalm with vowels, alongside the Koine Greek text in the Septuagint and the English translation from the King James Version. Note that the meaning can slightly differ between these versions, as the Septuagint and the Masoretic Text come from different textual traditions. (Note: A 1917 translation directly from Hebrew to English by the Jewish Publication Society can be found here or here, and an 1844 translation directly from the Septuagint by L. C. L. Brenton can be found here. Both translations are in the public domain.) In the Septuagint, this psalm is numbered Psalm 18.

| # | Hebrew | English | Greek |
|---|---|---|---|
| (Note: In the Jewish verse numbering, the ascription of this psalm is verse 1, and the rest of the psalm begins from verse 2. However, the Christian verse numbering does not count the ascription as a separate verse.) | לַמְנַצֵּ֗חַ מִזְמ֥וֹר לְדָוִֽד׃ | (To the chief Musician, A Psalm of David.) | Εἰς τὸ τέλος· ψαλμὸς τῷ Δαυΐδ. - |
| 1 | הַשָּׁמַ֗יִם מְֽסַפְּרִ֥ים כְּבֽוֹד־אֵ֑ל וּֽמַעֲשֵׂ֥ה יָ֝דָ֗יו מַגִּ֥יד הָרָקִֽיעַ׃ | The heavens declare the glory of God; and the firmament sheweth his handywork. | ΟΙ ΟΥΡΑΝΟΙ διηγοῦνται δόξαν Θεοῦ, ποίησιν δὲ χειρῶν αὐτοῦ ἀναγγέλλει τὸ στερέωμα. |
| 2 | י֣וֹם לְ֭יוֹם יַבִּ֣יעַֽ אֹ֑מֶר וְלַ֥יְלָה לְּ֝לַ֗יְלָה יְחַוֶּה־דָּֽעַת׃ | Day unto day uttereth speech, and night unto night sheweth knowledge. | ἡμέρα τῇ ἡμέρᾳ ἐρεύγεται ῥῆμα, καὶ νὺξ νυκτὶ ἀναγγέλλει γνῶσιν. |
| 3 | אֵֽין־אֹ֭מֶר וְאֵ֣ין דְּבָרִ֑ים בְּ֝לִ֗י נִשְׁמָ֥ע קוֹלָֽם׃ | There is no speech nor language, where their voice is not heard. | οὐκ εἰσὶ λαλιαὶ οὐδὲ λόγοι, ὧν οὐχὶ ἀκούονται αἱ φωναὶ αὐτῶν· |
| 4 | בְּכׇל־הָאָ֨רֶץ ׀ יָ֘צָ֤א קַוָּ֗ם וּבִקְצֵ֣ה תֵ֭בֵל מִלֵּיהֶ֑ם לַ֝שֶּׁ֗מֶשׁ שָֽׂם־אֹ֥הֶל בָּהֶֽם׃ | Their line is gone out through all the earth, and their words to the end of the world. In them hath he set a tabernacle for the sun, | εἰς πᾶσαν τὴν γῆν ἐξῆλθεν ὁ φθόγγος αὐτῶν καὶ εἰς τὰ πέρατα τῆς οἰκουμένης τὰ ῥήματα αὐτῶν. |
| 5 | וְה֗וּא כְּ֭חָתָן יֹצֵ֣א מֵחֻפָּת֑וֹ יָשִׂ֥ישׂ כְּ֝גִבּ֗וֹר לָר֥וּץ אֹֽרַח׃ | Which is as a bridegroom coming out of his chamber, and rejoiceth as a strong man to run a race. | ἐν τῷ ἡλίῳ ἔθετο τὸ σκήνωμα αὐτοῦ· καὶ αὐτὸς ὡς νυμφίος ἐκπορευόμενος ἐκ παστοῦ αὐτοῦ, ἀγαλλιάσεται ὡς γίγας δραμεῖν ὁδὸν αὐτοῦ. |
| 6 | מִקְצֵ֤ה הַשָּׁמַ֨יִם ׀ מֽוֹצָא֗וֹ וּתְקוּפָת֥וֹ עַל־קְצוֹתָ֑ם וְאֵ֥ין נִ֝סְתָּ֗ר מֵחַמָּתֽוֹ׃ | His going forth is from the end of the heaven, and his circuit unto the ends of it: and there is nothing hid from the heat thereof. | ἀπ᾿ ἄκρου τοῦ οὐρανοῦ ἡ ἔξοδος αὐτοῦ, καὶ τὸ κατάντημα αὐτοῦ ἕως ἄκρου τοῦ οὐρανοῦ, καὶ οὐκ ἔστιν ὃς ἀποκρυβήσεται τῆς θέρμης αὐτοῦ. |
| 7 | תּ֘וֹרַ֤ת יְהֹוָ֣ה תְּ֭מִימָה מְשִׁ֣יבַת נָ֑פֶשׁ עֵד֥וּת יְהֹוָ֥ה נֶ֝אֱמָנָ֗ה מַחְכִּ֥ימַת פֶּֽתִי׃ | The law of the LORD is perfect, converting the soul: the testimony of the LORD is sure, making wise the simple. | ὁ νόμος τοῦ Κυρίου ἄμωμος, ἐπιστρέφων ψυχάς· ἡ μαρτυρία Κυρίου πιστή, σοφίζουσα νήπια. |
| 8 | פִּקּ֘וּדֵ֤י יְהֹוָ֣ה יְ֭שָׁרִים מְשַׂמְּחֵי־לֵ֑ב מִצְוַ֥ת יְהֹוָ֥ה בָּ֝רָ֗ה מְאִירַ֥ת עֵינָֽיִם׃ | The statutes of the LORD are right, rejoicing the heart: the commandment of the LORD is pure, enlightening the eyes. | τὰ δικαιώματα Κυρίου εὐθέα, εὐφραίνοντα καρδίαν· ἡ ἐντολὴ Κυρίου τηλαυγής, φωτίζουσα ὀφθαλμούς· |
| 9 | יִרְאַ֤ת יְהֹוָ֨ה ׀ טְהוֹרָה֮ עוֹמֶ֢דֶת לָ֫עַ֥ד מִֽשְׁפְּטֵי־יְהֹוָ֥ה אֱמֶ֑ת צָֽדְק֥וּ יַחְדָּֽו׃ | The fear of the LORD is clean, enduring for ever: the judgments of the LORD are true and righteous altogether. | ὁ φόβος Κυρίου ἁγνός, διαμένων εἰς αἰῶνα αἰῶνος· τὰ κρίματα Κυρίου ἀληθινά, δεδικαιωμένα ἐπὶ τὸ αὐτό, |
| 10 | הַֽנֶּחֱמָדִ֗ים מִ֭זָּהָב וּמִפַּ֣ז רָ֑ב וּמְתוּקִ֥ים מִ֝דְּבַ֗שׁ וְנֹ֣פֶת צוּפִֽים׃ | More to be desired are they than gold, yea, than much fine gold: sweeter also than honey and the honeycomb. | ἐπιθυμητὰ ὑπὲρ χρυσίον καὶ λίθον τίμιον πολὺν καὶ γλυκύτερα ὑπὲρ μέλι καὶ κηρίον. |
| 11 | גַּֽם־עַ֭בְדְּךָ נִזְהָ֣ר בָּהֶ֑ם בְּ֝שׇׁמְרָ֗ם עֵ֣קֶב רָֽב׃ | Moreover by them is thy servant warned: and in keeping of them there is great reward. | καὶ γὰρ ὁ δοῦλός σου φυλάσσει αὐτά· ἐν τῷ φυλάσσειν αὐτὰ ἀνταπόδοσις πολλή. |
| 12 | שְׁגִיא֥וֹת מִֽי־יָבִ֑ין מִֽנִּסְתָּר֥וֹת נַקֵּֽנִי׃ | Who can understand his errors? cleanse thou me from secret faults. | παραπτώματα τίς συνήσει; ἐκ τῶν κρυφίων μου καθάρισόν με. |
| 13 | גַּ֤ם מִזֵּדִ֨ים ׀ חֲשֹׂ֬ךְ עַבְדֶּ֗ךָ אַֽל־יִמְשְׁלוּ־בִ֣י אָ֣ז אֵיתָ֑ם וְ֝נִקֵּ֗יתִי מִפֶּ֥שַֽׁע רָֽב׃ | Keep back thy servant also from presumptuous sins; let them not have dominion over me: then shall I be upright, and I shall be innocent from the great transgression. | καὶ ἀπὸ ἀλλοτρίων φεῖσαι τοῦ δούλου σου· ἐὰν μή μου κατακυριεύσωσι, τότε ἄμωμος ἔσομαι καὶ καθαρισθήσομαι ἀπὸ ἁμαρτίας μεγάλης. |
| 14 | יִ֥הְיֽוּ־לְרָצ֨וֹן ׀ אִמְרֵי־פִ֡י וְהֶגְי֣וֹן לִבִּ֣י לְפָנֶ֑יךָ יְ֝הֹוָ֗ה צוּרִ֥י וְגֹאֲלִֽי׃ | Let the words of my mouth, and the meditation of my heart, be acceptable in thy sight, O LORD, my strength, and my redeemer. | καὶ ἔσονται εἰς εὐδοκίαν τὰ λόγια τοῦ στόματός μου καὶ ἡ μελέτη τῆς καρδίας μου ἐνώπιόν σου διὰ παντός, Κύριε, βοηθέ μου καὶ λυτρωτά μου. |

== Uses ==
The final verse in both the Hebrew and KJV versions, "Let the words of my mouth, and the meditation of my heart, be acceptable in thy sight, O Lord, my strength, and my Redeemer," is used as a prayer in both the Jewish and Christian traditions. A version which refers to "the meditation of our hearts", i.e. those of the congregation, is often used at the start of a sermon.

=== Judaism ===
Psalm 19 is recited in its entirety during the Pesukei dezimra of Shabbat and Yom Tov. It is also recited as the psalm of the day on Shavuot in the Gra siddur. In Siddur Avodas Yisroel, it is recited as the psalm of the day on Hanukkah, and as the Shabbat psalm for the Torah portion of Yitro. Some say this psalm on a wedding day, and as a prayer for heavenly guidance.

The verses of this psalm are recited before each hakafah on Simchat Torah.

In the ancient Jewish text Perek Shirah, verse 2 (in the Hebrew) is said by the heavens and verse 3 is said by the day.

Verses 8 and 9 (in the Hebrew) are recited in the synagogue after the first person is called up to the Torah.

Verses 12 and 13 (in the Hebrew) are part of Selichos.

Verse 15 (in the Hebrew) is recited in several parts of the Jewish prayer service, including: at the conclusion of the Amidah; and in some communities during the removal of the Torah scroll from the Ark on Rosh Hashanah, Yom Kippur, and Yom Tov; as part of Selichos; and at the conclusion of Tefillah Zakah, a prayer for Yom Kippur eve.

=== New Testament ===
Verse 4 is quoted in Romans 10:18.

=== Catholic Church ===
In the Rule of Saint Benedict of the Benedictine Order, the psalm is to be recited at Prime on Saturdays.

=== Coptic Orthodox Church ===
In the Agpeya, the Coptic Church's book of hours, this psalm is prayed in the office of Prime.

=== Book of Common Prayer ===
In the Church of England's Book of Common Prayer, this psalm is appointed to be read on the morning of the fourth day of the month, as well as at Mattins on Christmas Day.

== Musical settings ==
Psalm 19 has been set to music several times. Handel's Messiah features a setting of the fourth verse of the Psalm in the chorus "Their Sound is Gone Out."

In France, Jean-Joseph Cassanéa de Mondonville composed in 1749, le grand motet de type versaillais "Cæli enarrant gloriam Dei " and Camille Saint-Saëns composed in 1865 one "Cæli enarrant" (Psaume XVIII) op. 42.

Notable settings to German texts include:

- Heinrich Schütz in "Die Himmel, Herr, preisen dein göttliche Macht und Ehr", SWV 115 as part of the Becker Psalter, published in 1628.
- Johann Sebastian Bach in the cantata Die Himmel erzählen die Ehre Gottes, BWV 76 (1723)
- Joseph Haydn in "Die Himmel erzählen" ("The Heavens are Telling") – the chorus at the end of part 1 of his oratorio Die Schöpfung (1798)
- Ludwig van Beethoven in his 1803 song for voice and piano, "Die Himmel rühmen des Ewigen Ehre", setting a paraphrase by Gellert in "Die Himmel rühmen des Ewigen Ehre", a song from an 1803 lieder collection.

In Protestant Christianity, various metrical settings of Psalm 19 have been published, including "The heav'ns and firmament on high do wondrously declare" in The Whole Booke of Psalmes (Thomas Sternhold and John Hopkins, 1584) and "The heav’ns God’s glory do declare" in the Scottish Psalter (1650).

The American composer Steve Reich set part of the Hebrew text in his 1981 work Tehillim.

The Rastafarian song "Rivers of Babylon" (recorded 1970 by The Melodians) includes a reference to the Amidah through verse 14 of Psalm 19 in English together with a reference to Psalm 137 that was written in memory of the first destruction of Zion (Jerusalem) by the Babylonians in 586 BC (the city and the Second Temple were destroyed in 70 AD by the Romans). This song was also popularized as a cover recorded by Boney M. in 1978.

"Torat Hashem Temimah" (The word of God is perfect), consisting of the first five words of verse 8 (in the Hebrew), is a popular Jewish song.

=== Other ===
"The judgements of the Lord are true and righteous altogether", a phrase from Psalm 19:9, is inscribed on the Lincoln Memorial in Washington DC.

== Sources ==
- Scherman, Rabbi Nosson (1985). The Complete ArtScroll Machzor – Rosh Hashanah (1st ed.). Mesorah Publications Ltd. ISBN 978-0-89906-676-9.
- Scherman, Rabbi Nosson (1986). The Complete ArtScroll Machzor – Yom Kippur (1st ed.). Mesorah Publications Ltd. ISBN 0-89906-677-1.
- Scherman, Rabbi Nosson (2003). The Complete ArtScroll Siddur (3rd ed.). Mesorah Publications, Ltd. ISBN 9780899066509.
