= Die Himmel rühmen des Ewigen Ehre =

Religious musical composition by Beethoven

- Lied by Ludwig van Beethoven
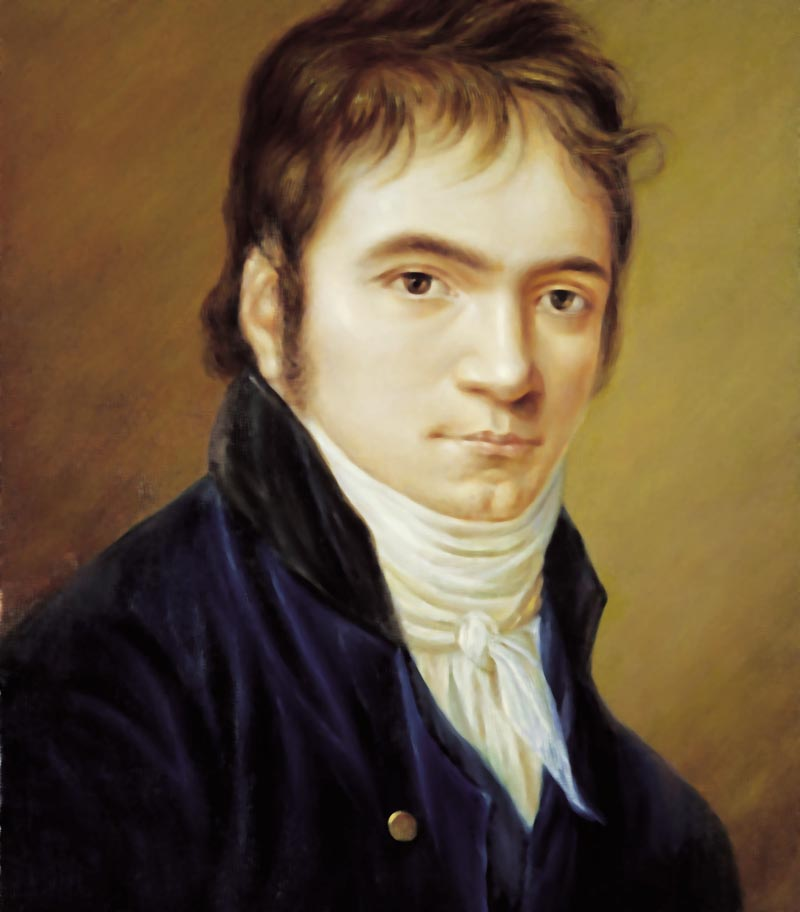
- Beethoven in 1803, painting by Christian Horneman
- English: The heavens praise the glory of the Eternal
- Other name: "Die Ehre Gottes aus der Natur"
- Key: C major
- Opus: 48/4
- Text: "Die Ehre Gottes aus der Natur"
- Language: German
- Published: 1803
- Scoring: voice; piano

"Die Himmel rühmen des Ewigen Ehre" (The heavens praise the glory of the Eternal), Op. 48/4, is a composition for voice and piano by Ludwig van Beethoven, setting the beginning of Christian Fürchtegott Gellert's poem "Die Ehre Gottes aus der Natur" (The glory of God from nature), a paraphrase of Psalm 19. Beethoven composed it as part of a collection of lieder on texts by Gellert, which was published in 1803, known as Gellert Lieder. "Die Himmel rühmen des Ewigen Ehre" became famous in arrangements for choir, "Die Himmel rühmen!" by Joseph Dantonello and "The Heavens are Telling" by Virgil Thomson.

== History ==
Beethoven wrote the lied for voice and piano as the fourth of a collection of six lieder on texts by Gellert. Gellert's poem in six stanzas, "Die Ehre Gottes aus der Natur", appeared first in his 1757 collection Geistliche Oden und Lieder (Spiritual odes and songs). It is a paraphrase of Psalm 19 ("The heavens declare the glory of God"). Like the psalm, the poem speaks of the Creator's magnificence showing in the wonders of nature, which suited natural theology, popular during Gellert's lifetime. The poem was set to music for voice and continuo in Carl Philipp Emanuel Bach's Gellert Odes and Songs. in 1758, among several others.

Beethoven set the first two stanzas of the poem. It was published as No. 4 in a collection of six lieder by Beethoven on texts by Gellert in 1803. In the collection, it bears the same title as the poem and begins "Die Himmel rühmen des Ewigen Ehre".

Beethoven's setting was arranged for four-part choir, organ and orchestra by Joseph Dantonello and became one of the most popular spiritual songs. It was arranged for organ and choir as "The Heavens are Telling" in 1925 by Virgil Thomson while he was a student at Harvard University, and became popular in the United States. Thomas Doss wrote a transcription for wind band with optional choir. An English version, "The heavens are telling the Lord's endless glory", with Beethoven's melody has appeared in four hymnals.

== Song collection ==
In the collection Op. 48, Beethoven set six texts by Gellert, all with religious themes, entitled:

1. Bitten
2. Die Liebe des Nächsten (Of the love of one's neighbour)
3. Vom Tode (Of death)
4. Die Ehre Gottes aus der Natur (The glory of God from nature)
5. Gottes Macht und Vorsehung (God's power and providence
6. Bußlied (Penitential song)

Five songs are marked in German, while only the last one has a conventional Italian marking. The first song begins "Gott, deine Güte reicht so weit" (God, your mercy reaches far), alluding to Psalm 108:4. It is marked Feierlich und mit Andacht (Solemnly and with devotion). The second song, "So jemand spricht: Ich liebe Gott!" (If someone says: I love God), is marked Lebhaft doch nicht zu sehr (Lively but not too much). The third song, "Meine Lebenszeit verstreicht" (My life time is passing by) is marked Mässig und eher langsam als geschwind (Moderately and rather slow than fast). The fifth song claims "Gott ist mein Lied!" (God is my song), marked Mit Kraft und Feuer (With strength and fire). The final penitential song begins "An dir allein, an dir hab ich gesündigt" (Against you alone, against you have I sinned) and is marked Poco adagio (Somewhat slow).

Beethoven dedicated the collection to Count Johann Georg von Browne.

== Die Himmel rühmen ==
=== Text ===
Gellert's text is close to the beginning of Psalm 19 in the first two stanzas, which are the only ones that Beethoven used.

Die Himmel rühmen des Ewigen Ehre,
Ihr Schall pflanzt seinen Namen fort.
Ihn rühmt der Erdkreis, ihn preisen die Meere,
Vernimm, o Mensch, ihr göttlich Wort.

Wer trägt der Himmel unzählbare Sterne?
Wer führt die Sonn' aus ihrem Zelt?
Sie kommt und leuchtet und lacht uns von ferne,
Und läuft den Weg gleich wie ein Held.

=== Music ===
Beethoven ignored the two stanzas of the poem, structuring the text differently as a ternary form, ABA. He used the first two lines for a solemn A section; the following four (two from the first stanza and two from the second) for a softer, narrating middle section, beginning with "Ihn rühmt der Erdkreis" (The circle of the world praises Him); and the final two lines for a slightly modified repeat of the beginning, with the text "Sie kommt und leuchtet" (It comes and illuminates), the second half of the second stanza.

The music in C major and alla breve time is marked "Majestätisch und erhaben" (Majestic and sublime). The music opens with two measures of solemn chords by the piano. The motif of a downward broken major triad is also found in other compositions by Beethoven dealing with solemn topics, such as the Dona nobis pacem from his Missa solemnis.

== Die Himmel rühmen! ==
Beethoven's song and its adaptations became part of music collections, concerts and recordings, with Die Himmel rühmen! sometimes chosen as the title. The German pop singer Heino chose the song as the title and motto of four church concert series in Germany in 2013.
