= Lutz Landwehr von Pragenau =

German composer of classical music (born 1963)

- Born: 1963 (age 62–63); Regensburg, Germany
- Genres: Classical
- Occupation: Composer

Lutz Landwehr von Pragenau (born 1963) is a German composer of classical music.

He was born in Regensburg and studied composition with Wilhelm Killmayer at the Hochschule für Musik und Theater München, continued in a masterclass with Hans-Jürgen von Bose from 1992 to 1994. He has been teaching music pedagogy at the Regensburg University.

== Selected works ==
- Der Jäger von Fall, opera after a libretto by Wilhelm Killmayer (1991)

Orchestra

- Times Square Music for large orchestra Orchester (1990)
- Running Riot for brass band and orchestra (1993)
- ...mild und leise..., Tristan's death for large orchestra (2010)

Chamber music

- Klavierquintett für Paul Celan, piano quintet (1990)
- Berührungen for piano 4 hands and conga (1999)
- The Day After Rendevouz for violin, tuba and tape (1992)
- Silence invades the breathing wood for soprano, violin, viola, cello and small percussion (2011)
- Takte und Gewichte, string quartet (2001)
- In der Schwebe for cello and piano (2009)
- Yolimba läßt grüßen, variations on a theme by Wilhelm Killmayer for violin and piano (2010)
- Duo concertant for two pianos (1997)

Vocal

- Zwei Lieder für Bariton und Klavier, songs for baritone and piano on poems by Otto Julius Bierbaum (1979): op.1/1 (Freundliche Vision), op.1/2 (Traum durch die Dämmerung)
- Missa in excelsis, mass for women choir (2002)
- tierisch gebildet, cantata for speaker, choir and instruments after poems by Christian Morgenstern (2004)
- Zwei Lieder für tiefe Stimme (two songs for a low voice) on Italian texts by Aldo Palazzeschi (2008): 1) Il Passo delle Nazarene 2) Il segno
