= Christian Fürchtegott Gellert =

German poet

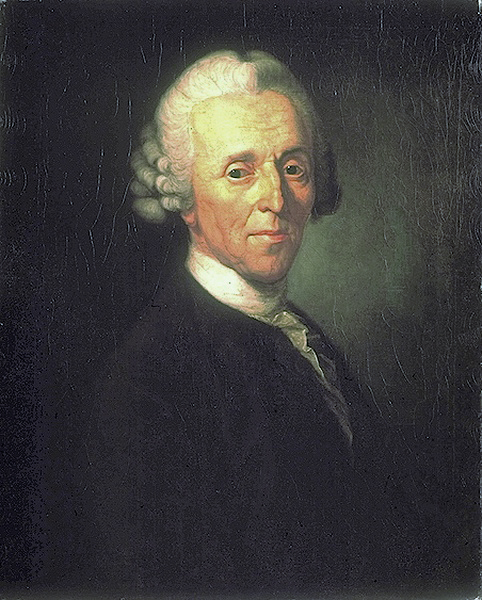
- Christian Fürchtegott Gellert. Painting by Anton Graff
- Born: 4 July 1715; Hainichen, Electoral Saxony
- Died: 13 December 1769 (aged 54); Leipzig, Electoral Saxony

Christian Fürchtegott Gellert (4 July 1715 – 13 December 1769) was a German poet, novelist, and popular moralistic writer, one of the forerunners of the golden age of German literature that was ushered in by Lessing.

== Biography ==
Gellert was born at Hainichen in Saxony, on 4 July 1715 at the foot of the Erzgebirge. After attending the school of St. Afra in Meissen, he entered Leipzig University in 1734 as a student of theology, but in 1738 Gellert broke off his studies as his family could no longer afford to support him and became a private tutor for a few years. Returning to Leipzig in 1741, he contributed to the Bremer Beiträge, a periodical founded by former disciples of Johann Christoph Gottsched who had revolted against the pedantry of his school. Owing to shyness and poor health, Gellert gave up the idea of entering the ministry. However, he finally completed his magister degree in 1743 and qualified as a university lecturer in 1744. In 1745 he established himself as a Privatdozent in philosophy at the university of Leipzig, lecturing on poetry, rhetoric, and moral philosophy. In 1751 he was appointed extraordinary professor of philosophy, a post he held until his death at Leipzig in 1769. His brother Christlieb Ehregott Gellert became a noted metallurgist at the mining academy in Freiberg.

== Works ==
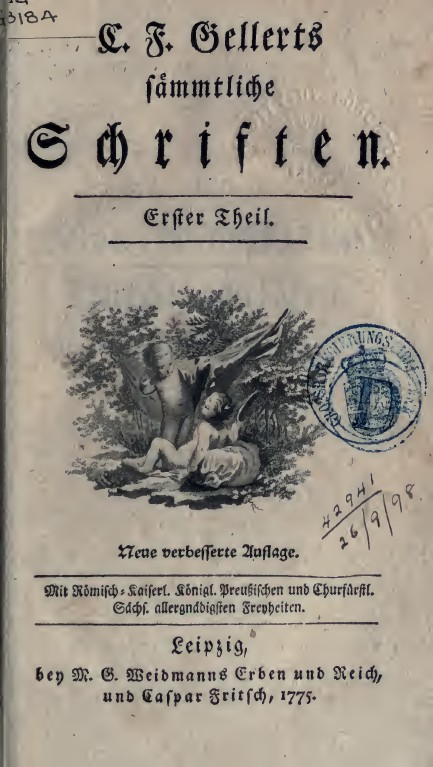
C. F. Gellerts sämmtliche Schriften. 1 (1775)

Gellert was esteemed and venerated by his students, and others who knew him, due in great part to his personal character; he was known to be unflaggingly amiable and generous, and of unaffected piety and humility. He wrote in order to raise the religious and moral character of the people, and to this end employed language which, though at times prolix, was always correct and clear. He thus became one of the most popular German authors, and some of his poems enjoyed a celebrity out of proportion to their literary value. His immensely successful collection of fables and stories in verse, Fabeln und Erzählungen, first published in 1746, with a second part appearing in 1748, established his literary reputation. A comparably popular collection of religious poems and hymns, Geistliche Oden und Lieder, appeared in 1758. It contained hymns such as "Herr, stärke mich, dein Leiden zu bedenken", a Passion hymn written to the tune of "Herzliebster Jesu".

Not a little of Gellert's fame is due to the time when he lived and wrote. The German literature of the period was dominated by Gottsched's school. A band of high-spirited youths, of whom Gellert was one, resolved to free themselves from what were seen as the conventional trammels of such pedants, and began a revolution which was finally consummated by Schiller and Goethe. Karl Philipp Moritz, in the context of his travels in England in 1782, remarked: "Among us Germans ... I can think of no poet's name beyond Gellert's which comes readily into the minds of the common people [in London]."

The fables, for which Gellert took La Fontaine as his model, are simple and didactic. His religious poems were adopted as hymns by Catholics and Protestants alike. The best known of his hymns is "Die Ehre Gottes aus der Natur" (“The Heavens are Telling”). Gellert wrote a few sentimental comedies: Die Betschwester (The Praying Sister, 1745), Die kranke Frau (The Sick Woman, 1747), Das Los in der Lotterie (1748), and Die zärtlichen Schwestern (The Affectionate Sisters, 1747), the last of which was much admired. His novel Leben der schwedischen Gräfin von G. (1746), a weak imitation of Samuel Richardson's Pamela, is remarkable for being the first German attempt at a psychological novel.

Besides lecturing to large audiences on moral matters, Gellert maintained a wide-ranging correspondence with both strangers and friends, especially with those seeking advice on moral questions. Regarded by many correspondents as a teacher also of good writing style, in 1751 he published a volume of model letters, along with an essay on letter-writing (Briefe, nebst einer praktischen Abhandlung von dem guten Geschmacke in Briefen).

== Editions and studies ==
Haydn Abendlied zu Gott HobXXVc9

See Gellert's Sämtliche Schriften (first edition, 10 vols., Leipzig, 1769–1774; last edition, Berlin, 1867). Sämtliche Fabeln und Erzählungen have been often published separately, the latest edition in 1896. A selection of Gellert's poetry (with an excellent introduction) can be found in F. Muncker, Die Bremer Beiträge (Stuttgart, 1899).

For studies of Gellert's life and work see lives by J. A. Cramer (Leipzig, 1774), H. Döring (Greiz, 1833), and H. O. Nietschmann (2nd ed., Halle, 1901); also Gellerts Tagebuch aus dem Jahre 1761 (2nd ed., Leipzig, 1863) and Gellert's Briefwechsel mit Demoiselle Lucius (Leipzig, 1823).

== Translations ==
Gellert's Fables and Other Poems. Translated by J. A. Murke (London: 1851).

Fables and Tales by the German Aesop, C. F. Gellert (1715–1769). Translated by John W. Van Cleve (Lewiston and Lampeter: Mellen, 2013, ISBN 978-0-7734-4514-7).

"Jesus Lives! The Victory's Won" is a translation of Gellert's "Jesu lebt, mit ihm auch ich" (Jesus lives, I with him") from Geistliche Oden und Lieder. It is set to the tune of "Jesus, meine Zuversicht".

== Legacy ==
Beethoven set to music six of Gellert's poems as Sechs Lieder Gellerts am Klavier zu singen (1803); the poems were all from Geistliche Oden und Lieder, including "Die Ehre Gottes aus der Natur". Some of Gellerts poems became hymns, such as "Wenn ich, o Schöpfer, deine Macht".

In 1857 Berthold Auerbach paid tribute to Gellert in his story "Gellerts letzte Weihnachten", published in his Deutscher Familienkalender (German family almanac); the story was translated into English as "Christian Gellert's Last Christmas", first published in 1869.
