= Die Ehre Gottes aus der Natur =

"Die Ehre Gottes aus der Natur" is a poem by German pastor, poet, and hymnist Christian Fürchtegott Gellert, which first appeared in Gellert's 1757 Collection of Odes and Songs. The poem is best known in a setting by Ludwig van Beethoven (beginning "Die Himmel rühmen des Ewigen Ehre", Opus 48, No. 4) for vocal soloist and piano, published in 1803 as part of a lieder collection. Beethoven's Lied is usually entitled "Die Himmel rühmen", the opening words of the poem, or "The Heavens are Telling" in English. An arrangement for organ and choir ("The Heavens are Telling", 1925) by Virgil Thomson is a popular version in the United States. English speaking Anabaptist groups sometimes use his poem, translated as "The Heavens are praising", with music composed by Swiss composer Johann Heinrich Egli.

Gellert's poem is inspired by the opening verses of Psalm 19 and expands upon those verses with themes of natural theology popular during Gellert's lifetime, in which the Creator's magnificence is revealed in the wonders of nature.
