= Eugen Gura =

German opera singer

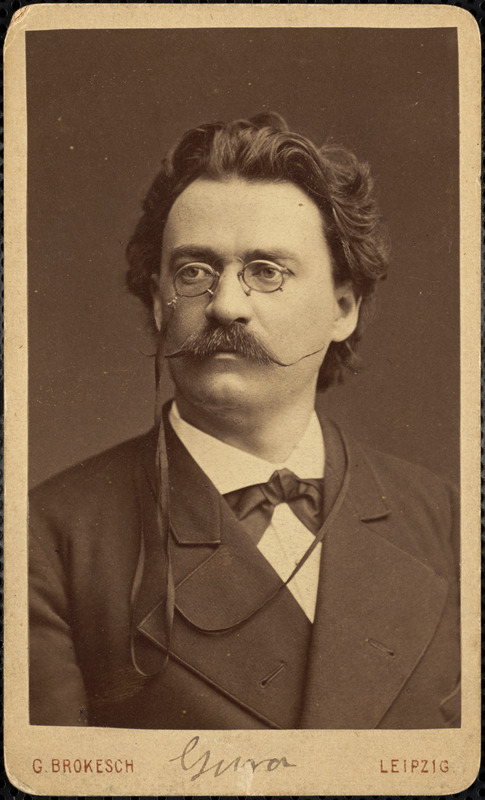
Eugen Gura, [ca. 1859–1870]. Carte de Visite Collection, Boston Public Library.

Eugen Gura (8 November 1842 – 26 August 1906) was a German operatic baritone of Bohemian origin, celebrated throughout Germany and internationally for his Wagnerian roles and his interpretation of German Lieder. He was a principal artist at the Leipzig Opera and the Hamburg State Opera, and took part in the historic first complete performance of Richard Wagner's Der Ring des Nibelungen at Bayreuth in 1876.

== Early life and education ==
Gura was born on 8 November 1842 in Nové Sedlo (then known as Pressern near Saatz), in Bohemia, at the time part of the Austrian Empire (now the Czech Republic).

He was initially educated to become a painter, studying at Vienna and Munich. However, on developing a fine baritone voice, he abandoned painting and enrolled at the Munich Conservatorium, where he trained as a professional singer.

== Career ==
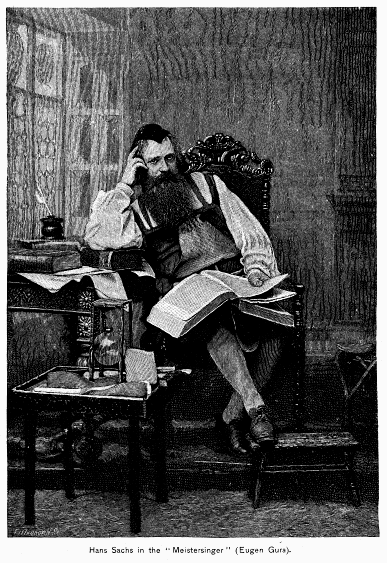
Gura in the role of Hans Sachs in Die Meistersinger von Nürnberg, a role which made him internationally famous.

In 1865, Gura made his operatic début at the Munich Opera. He quickly established himself as one of the leading baritones in German opera, being engaged principally at Leipzig from 1865 until 1876 and subsequently at the Hamburg State Opera until 1883, where he performed an extensive repertoire of major baritone roles.

=== Wagner at Bayreuth ===
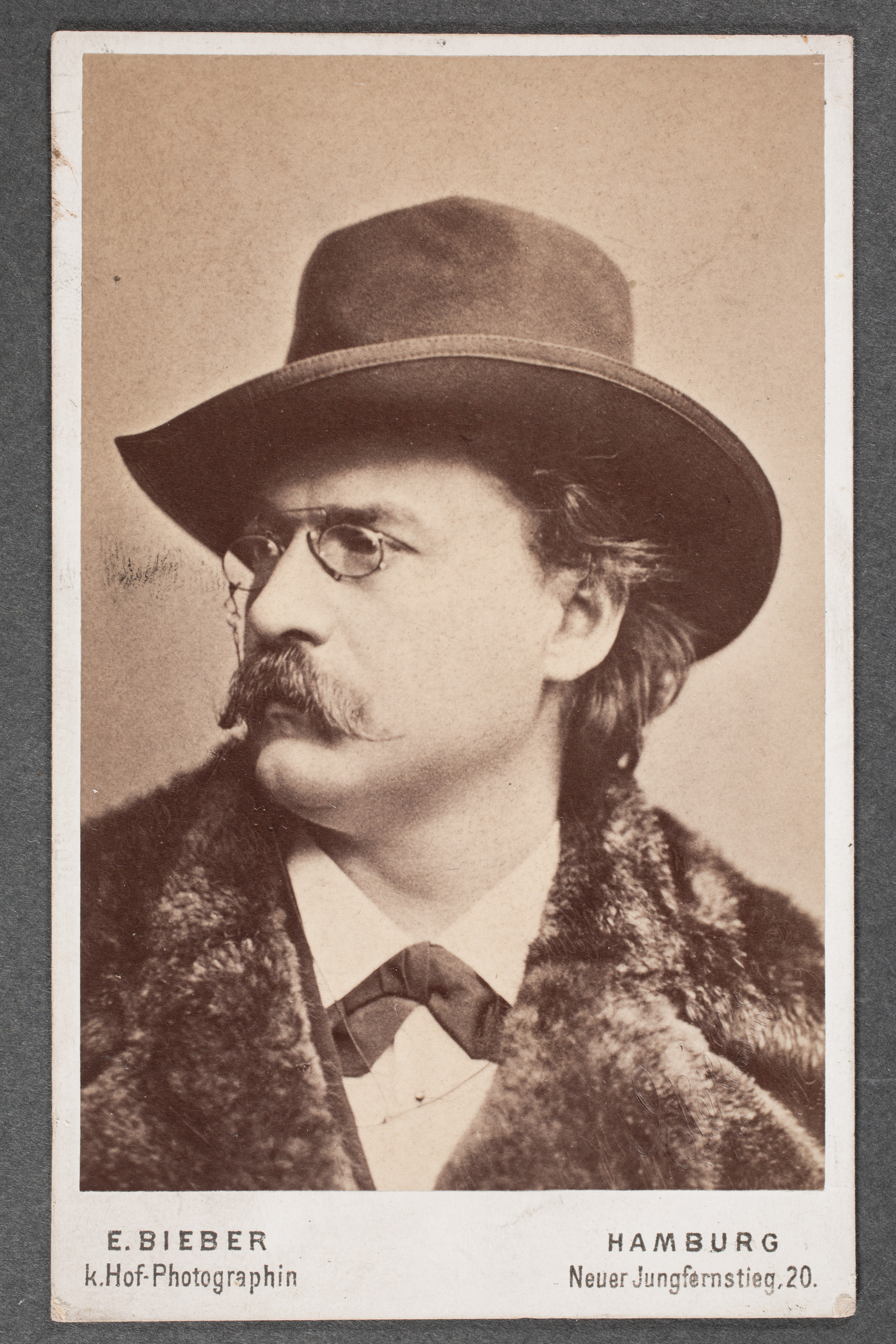
Gura photographed c. 1870, during his years at Leipzig Opera.

Gura was closely associated with the music of Richard Wagner throughout his career. In 1876, he took part in the famous inaugural Bayreuth Festival, where he created the role of Gunther in the world premiere of Götterdämmerung on 17 August 1876 — a performance that was part of the first complete production of the Ring Cycle.

He was also celebrated for his interpretation of Hans Sachs in Wagner's Die Meistersinger von Nürnberg. His portrayal of this role during the 1882 London season was particularly admired by critics and audiences as a landmark performance.

=== London 1882 ===
Gura appeared in London during the Her Majesty's Theatre German opera season of 1882. His performance as Hans Sachs in Die Meistersinger was widely praised as one of the finest interpretations of the role that London audiences had witnessed, cementing his international reputation beyond Germany.

=== Later career and Lieder ===
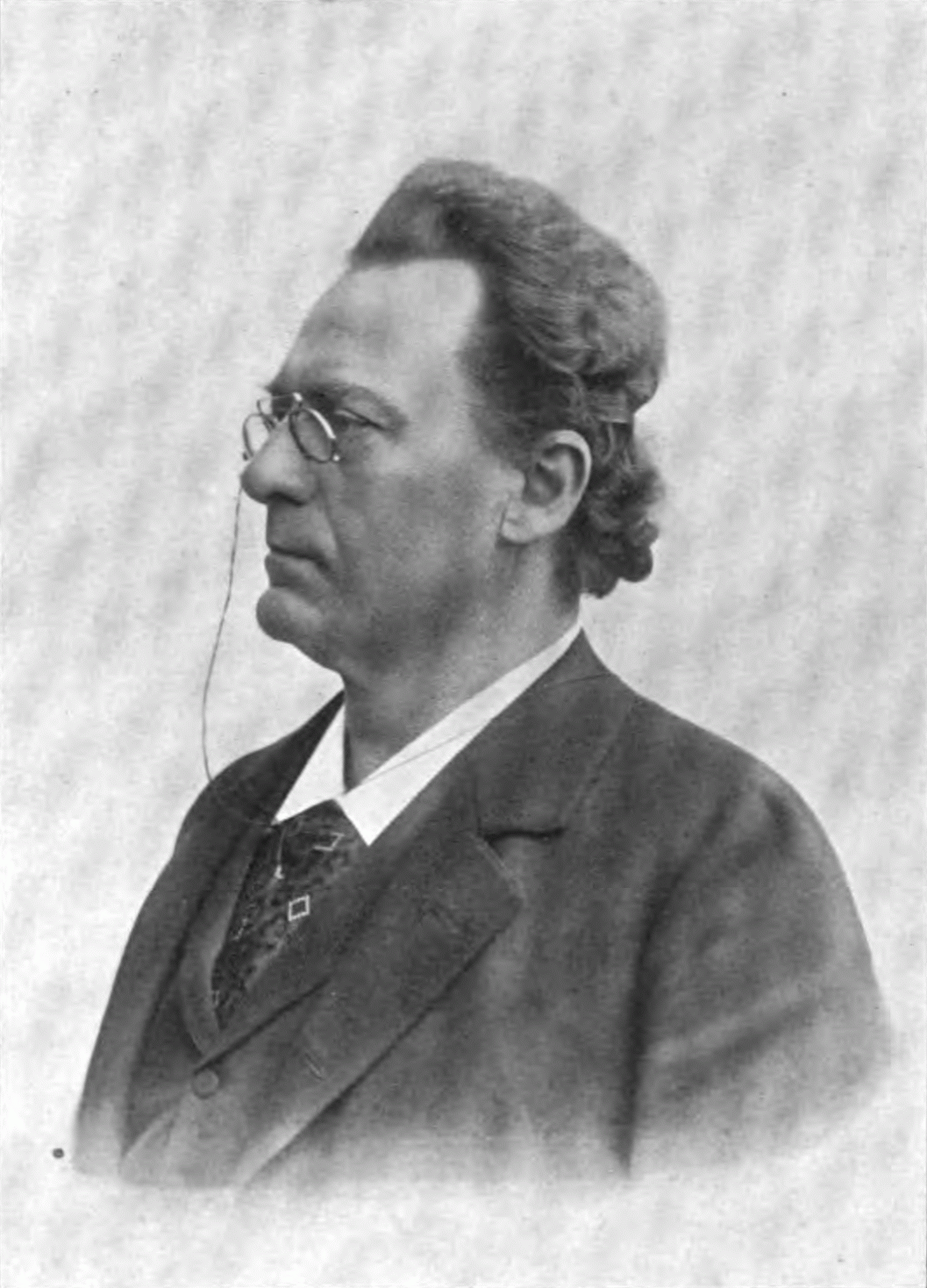
Gura photographed in 1902 by Gebrüder Lützel.

In his later years, as his operatic career wound down, Gura turned increasingly to German Lieder, and he became recognised for the musical refinement and interpretive depth of his concert singing. The 1911 Encyclopædia Britannica noted that "in later years he showed the perfection of art in his singing of German Lieder".

== Family ==
Gura's sons Hermann Gura and Eugen Gura Jr. both pursued careers in performance; Hermann became a notable actor and singer. His granddaughter Sascha Gura was a German actress of the silent film era.

== Death ==
Gura died on 26 August 1906 in Aufkirchen, part of the municipality of Berg in Bavaria.

== Roles ==
The following are among the principal roles for which Gura was celebrated:

Role	Opera	Composer	Notes
Gunther	Götterdämmerung	Richard Wagner	World premiere, Bayreuth Festival, 17 August 1876
Hans Sachs	Die Meistersinger von Nürnberg	Richard Wagner	London, 1882; widely regarded as definitive
Wotan	Die Walküre	Richard Wagner	Part of the 1876 Bayreuth Ring cycle
Don Giovanni	Don Giovanni	Mozart	Part of his Hamburg repertoire
