= The Captive Queen =

Patriotic cantata by Jean Sibelius (1906)

- Cantata by Jean Sibelius
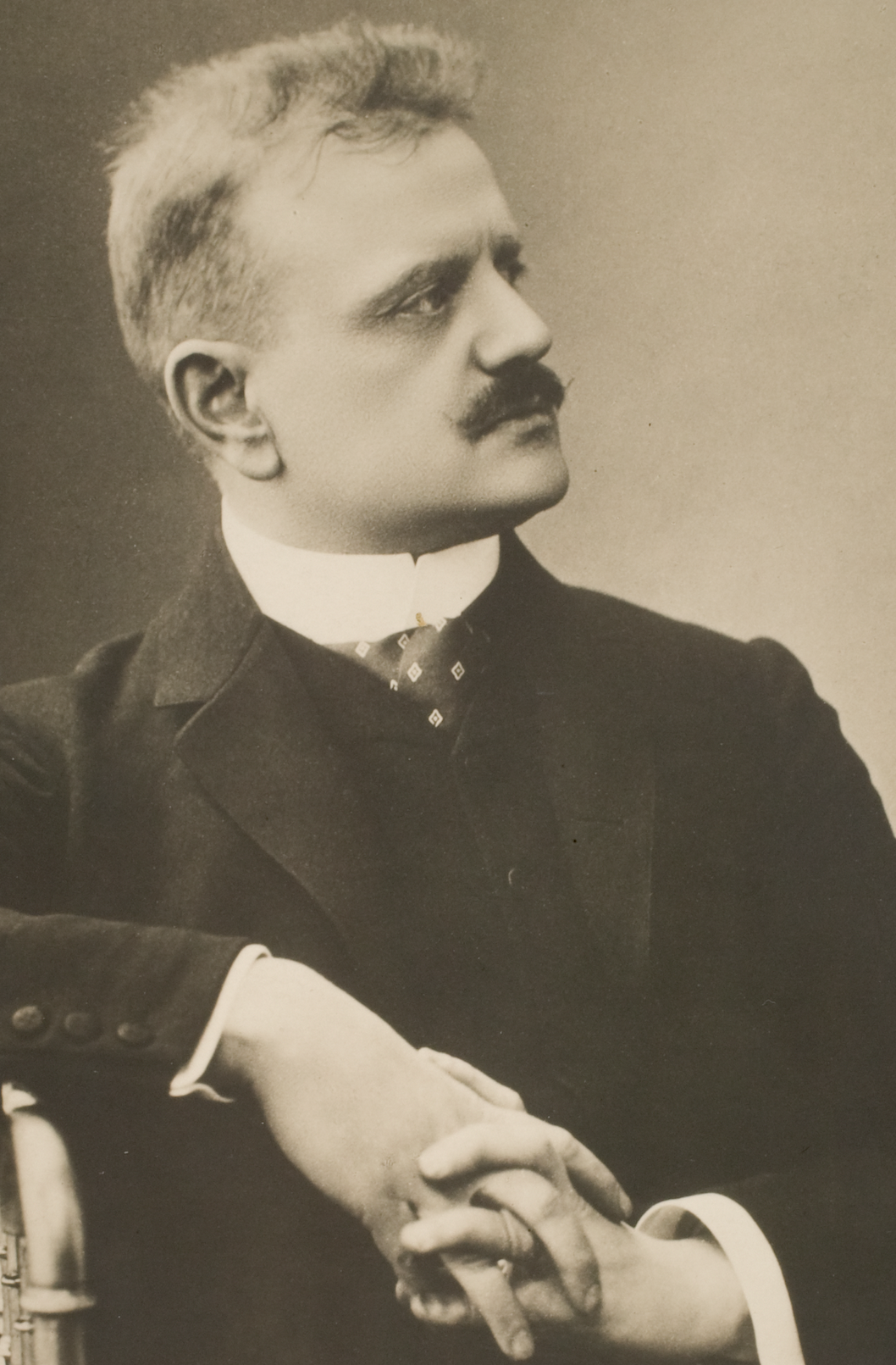
- The composer (c. 1905)
- Native name: Vapautettu kuningatar
- Opus: 48
- Text: Vapautettu kuningatar; by Paavo Cajander
- Language: Finnish
- Composed: 1906
- Publisher: Lienau (1907)
- Duration: 12 mins.

Premiere
- Date: 12 May 1906
- Location: Helsinki, Grand Duchy of Finland
- Conductor: Jean Sibelius
- Performers: Helsinki Philharmonic Society

The Captive Queen (in Finnish: Vapautettu kuningatar; sometimes translated to English as The Liberated Queen; subtitled "Cantata in Celebration of Snellman's Birth"), Op. 48, is a single-movement, patriotic cantata for mixed choir and orchestra written in 1906 by the Finnish composer Jean Sibelius. The piece, which is a setting of the Finnish author Paavo Cajander's Finnish-language poem of the same name, is chronologically the fifth of Sibelius's nine orchestral cantatas.

The Captive Queen was first performed in Helsinki on 12 May 1906 (Note: In Finland, Snellman's birthday, 12 May, is a customary flag day on which the Finnish government recommends—but does not legally require—the flag of Finland to be flown. The day is celebrated as the 'Day of Finnish Identity' ('Suomalaisuuden päivä').) by the Orchestra of Helsinki Philharmonic Society, conducted by the composer; however, it premiered under the title "There Sings the Queen" ("Siell' laulavi kuningatar") in order to avoid the attention of the imperial censors. Sibelius arranged the piece for male choir in 1910; this version was first performed on 28 November 1913 by the Choir of the Students' Union, with Heikki Klemetti conducting.

== Instrumentation ==
The Captive Queen is scored for the following instruments and voices, organized by family (vocalists, woodwinds, brass, percussion, and strings):

- Mixed choir (SATB) or male choir (TTBB)
- 2 flutes (one doubling piccolo), 2 oboes, 1 clarinet (in B♭), 1 bass clarinet (in B♭), and 1 bassoon
- 4 horns (in F), 2 trumpets (in F), and 3 trombones
- Timpani, bass drum, cymbals, (Note: Dahlström (2003) does not list cymbals among the instruments for The Captive Queen. This is clearly an accidental omission, as the score indicates "piatti" at marker L.) and triangle
- Violins (I and II), violas, cellos, and double basses

== History ==
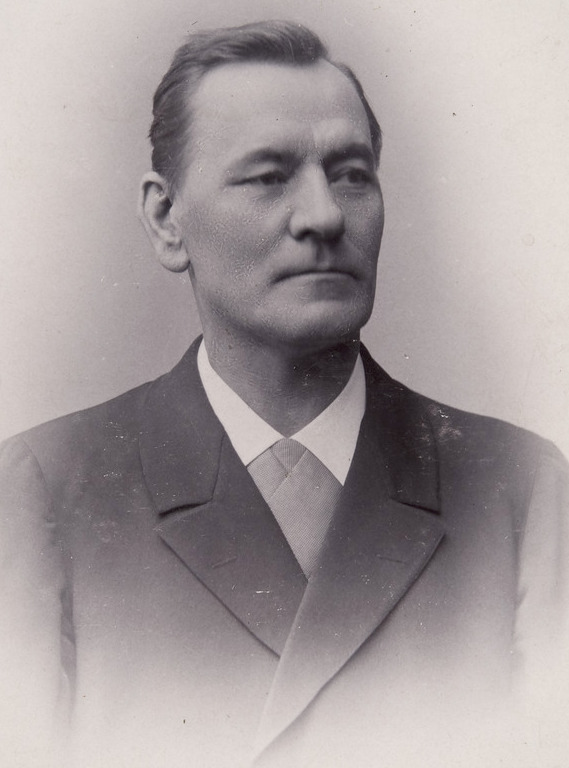
The Finnish author Paavo Cajander (c. 1898) wrote the text for Sibelius's cantata The Captive Queen.

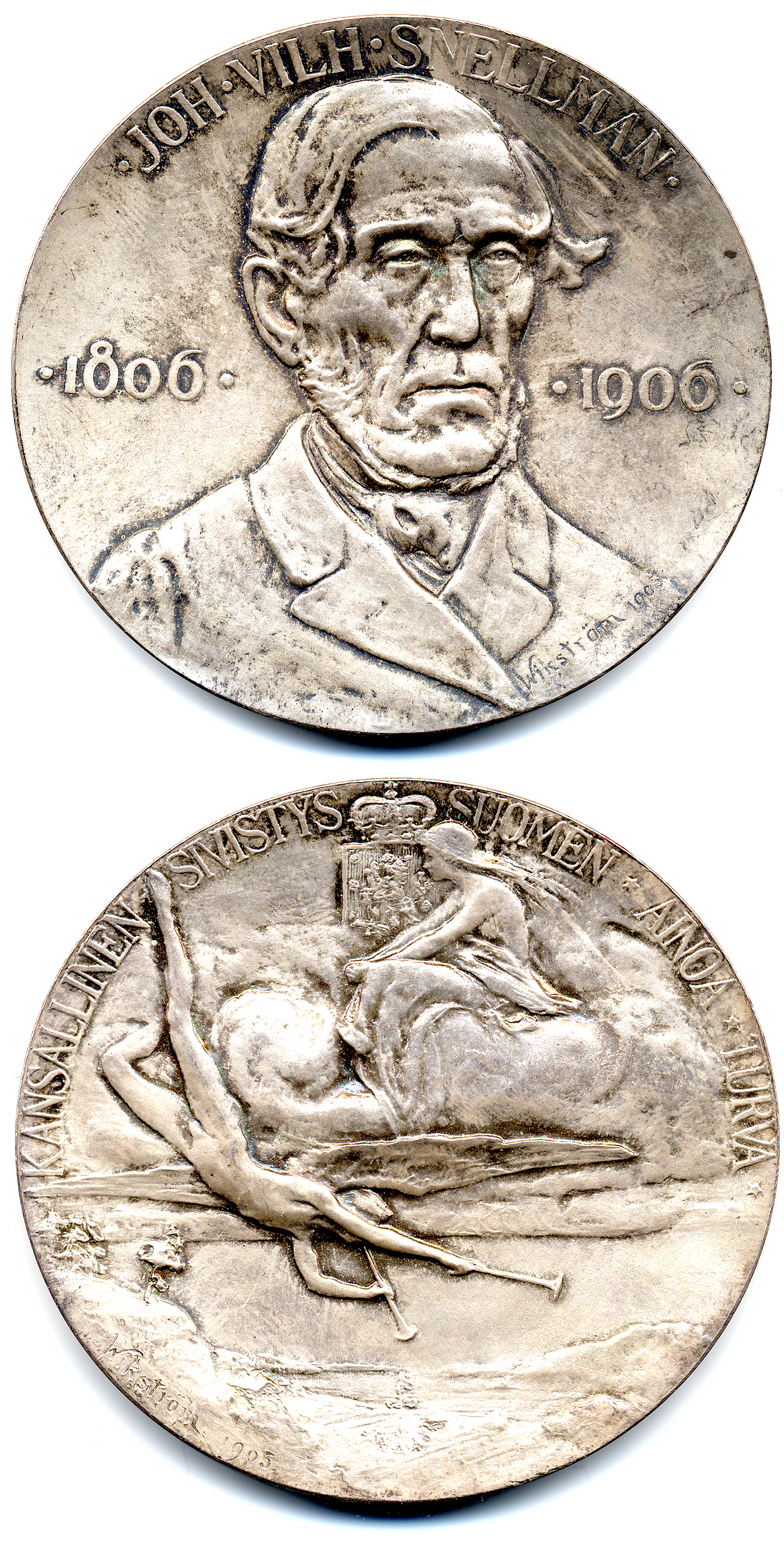
A medal commemorating the 1906 centennial of Snellman's birth

Sibelius composed the cantata for the centennial festivities that marked the birth (12 May 1806) of Johan Vilhelm Snellman, a philosopher and statesman who was an important contributor to the Fennoman cause.

The Finnish composer Oskar Merikanto also contributed a new piece for the occasion, the Cantata in Memory of J. V. Snellman (Kantaatti J. V. Snellmanin muistolle, OM100; text by A. V. Koskimies). This premiered two hours before The Captive Queen, albeit at a different venue: the Finnish National Theatre.

== Discography ==
The Finnish conductor Jorma Panula and the Helsinki Philharmonic Orchestra made the world premiere studio recording of The Captive Queen in September 1987 for Ondine; they were joined by a mixed choir credited as the "Academic Choir of Helsinki University" ("Helsingin Yliopiston Opettajankoulutuslaitoksen Kuoro"). Fabian Dahlström, in his 2003 catalogue of Sibelius works, however, connects this ensemble to Akateeminen Laulu, which was founded in 1953 as the mixed choir of the Student Union of the University of Helsinki. The table below lists this and other commercially available recordings:

No.	Conductor	Orchestra	Chorus	Rec. (Note: Refers to the year in which the performers recorded the work; this may not be the same as the year in which the recording was first released to the general public.)	Time (Note: All runtimes are official, as printed on CD or LP liner notes.)	Venue	Label	Ref.
1	Jorma Panula	Helsinki Philharmonic Orchestra	Akateeminen Laulu	1987	11:22	Kulttuuritalo	Ondine	(Note: J. Panula—Ondine (ODE 708) 1987)
2	Osmo Vänskä (1)	Lahti Symphony Orchestra (1)	Dominante Choir	2004	9:16	Sibelius Hall	BIS	(Note: O. Vänskä—BIS (CD–1365) 2005)
3	Osmo Vänskä (2)	Lahti Symphony Orchestra (2)	YL Male Voice Choir	2005	9:27	Sibelius Hall	BIS	(Note: O. Vänskä—BIS (CD–1525) 2007)
4	Alberto Hold-Garrido	Malmö Opera Orchestra	Lunds Studentsångförening	2011	10:11	Luftkastellet	Naxos	(Note: A. Hall-Garrido—Naxos (8.572871) 2012)

== Notes, references, and sources ==
Notes

Books and liner notes

- Barnett, Andrew (2005). Sibelius: Song of the Earth (booklet). Osmo Vänskä, Lahti Symphony Orchestra, & Dominante Choir. BIS. BIS CD-1365. OCLC 62255940
- Barnett, Andrew (2007). Sibelius. New Haven: Yale University Press. ISBN 978-0-300-11159-0.
- Dahlström, Fabian [in Swedish] (2003). Jean Sibelius: Thematisch-bibliographisches Verzeichnis seiner Werke [Jean Sibelius: A Thematic Bibliographic Index of His Works] (in German). Wiesbaden: Breitkopf & Härtel. ISBN 3-7651-0333-0.
- Lascar, Pierre-Yves (2003). Sibelius: Cantatas (booklet). Paavo Järvi, Estonian National Symphony Orchestra, & Estonian National Male Choir. Virgin Classics. 7243 5 45589 2 4. OCLC 52897195

Newspapers (by date)

- "Yliopiston juhla" [The University's celebrations]. Uusi Suometar (in Finnish). No. 109. 13 May 1906. p. 3.
- A. U. [Uggla, Alarik] [in Finnish] (12 May 1906). "Två Festkantater" [Two festive cantatas]. Hufvudstadsbladet (in Swedish). No. 128. p. 6.
