= Otto Julius Bierbaum =

German writer and poet (1865–1910)

- Born: 28 June 1865; Grünberg, Province of Silesia, Kingdom of Prussia
- Died: 1 February 1910 (aged 44); Kötzschenbroda, Kingdom of Saxony, German Empire
- Occupations: Writer, poet, journalist
- Writing career
- Language: German
- Genres: Fiction, poetry, journalism

Otto Julius Bierbaum (28 June 1865 – 1 February 1910) was a German writer.

Bierbaum was born in Grünberg, Silesia. After studying in Leipzig, he became a journalist and editor for the journals Die freie Bühne, Pan and Die Insel. His literary work was varied. As a poet he used forms like the Minnesang or the folksong and the Anacreontics style. Composers such as Pauline Volkstein set his texts to music.

In 1897 Bierbaum published his novel Stilpe which inspired Ernst von Wolzogen to establish, in 1901, the first cabaret venue ever in Berlin, the Überbrettl. His novel Zäpfel Kerns Abenteuer was an adaptation of Carlo Collodi's Pinocchio. Bierbaum's final novel, Yankeedoodlefahrt, was published in 1909 and is the source of the adage "Humor ist, wenn man trotzdem lacht" ("Humor is when you laugh anyway"), which has become a proverb in modern German.

Bierbaum died at Kötzschenbroda near Dresden.

== Works ==
- Erlebte Gedichte (1892)
  - "Traum durch die Dämmerung"
- Die Schlangendame (1896)
- Stilpe (1897)
- Das schöne Mädchen von Pao (1899)
- Eine empfindsame Reise im Automobil (1903)
- Zäpfel Kerns Abenteuer (1905)
- Yankeedoodlefahrt (1909)
- Samalio Pardulus (1911) Story illustrated by Alfred Kubin
- Prinz Kuckuck – Leben, Taten, Meinungen und Höllenfahrt eines Wollüstlings
- Nemt, Frouwe, disen Kranz, und andre Gedichte : op. 57 / (Text) von Otto Julius Bierbaum komponiert von Christian Sinding (From the Sibley Music Library Digital Score Collection)
- Innocence. Unschuld. (Words by) Bierbaum. English versionby Edwin Schneider. (Music by) Arthur Olaf Andersen. For piano and voice (From the Sibley Music Library Digital Score Collection)
- Sieben Gedichte aus Otto Julius Bierbaums Der neubestellte Irrgarten der Liebe : für eine Singstimme mit Klavierbegleitung, op. 85, for piano and voice(From the Sibley Music Library Digital Score Collection)
- Vier Gedichte von Otto Julius Bierbaum : für eine Singstimme mit Klavier, op. 101, for piano and voice (From the Sibley Music Library Digital Score Collection)

== Literature ==
- Hans Schwerte (1955). "Bierbaum, Otto Julius". Neue Deutsche Biographie (in German). Vol. 2. Berlin: Duncker & Humblot. pp. 231–232. (full text online).
- Projekt Gutenberg-DE
- Literaturportal: Otto Julius Bierbaum
- "Stilpe" on LibriVox
- Fritz Droop: Otto Julius Bierbaum, ein deutscher Lyriker. Hesse & Becker, Leipzig 1912.
- Klaus Peter Muschol: Otto Julius Bierbaums dramatische Werke. Univ., München 1961.
- Peter Muschol: Otto Julius Bierbaum Dichter und Corpsstudent. 1865 bis 1910. WJK-Verlag, Hilden 2010.
- Dushan Stankovich: Otto Julius Bierbaum – eine Werkmonographie. Lang, Bern und Frankfurt a. M. 1971.
- Izabela Taraszczuk: Zwei Wege zur Kommunikation: Otto Julius Bierbaum und Georg Beuchelt. In: Bąkiewicz, Marta Jadwiga (Hrsg.): An der mittleren Oder. Eine Kulturlandschaft im deutsch-polnischen Grenzraum. Paderborn 2016, pp. 246–264, ISBN 978-3-506-78288-5.
- William H. Wilkening: Otto Julius Bierbaum – the tragedy of a poet. A biography. Heinz, Stuttgart 1977, ISBN 3-88099-044-1.
