= Papyrus 27 =

Papyrus 𝔓^{27}
- New Testament manuscript
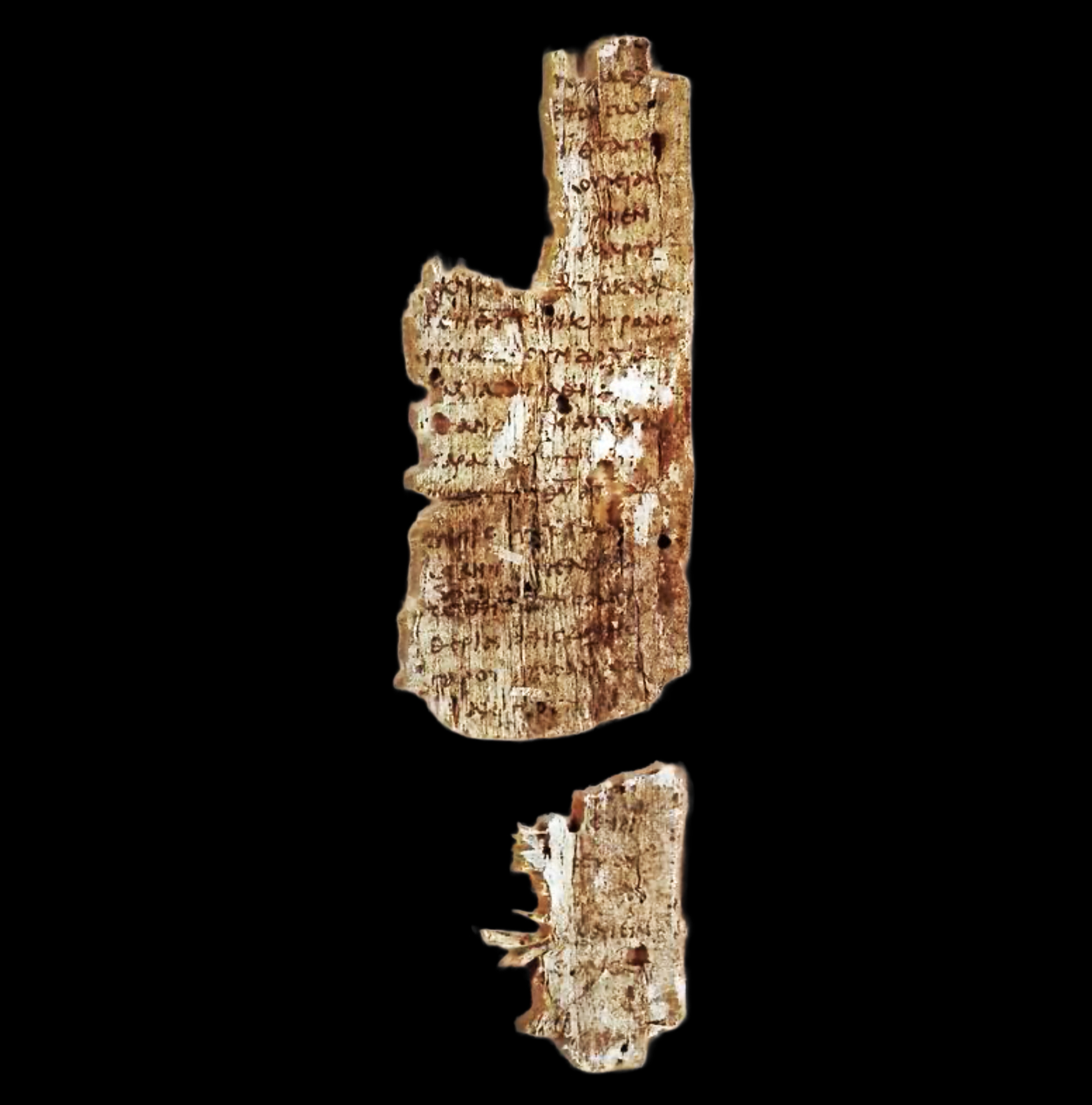
- Recto Romans 8:12-27
- Name: P. Oxy. 1355
- Text: Romans 8-9 †
- Date: 3rd century
- Script: Greek
- Found: Egypt
- Now at: Cambridge University Library
- Cite: B. P. Grenfell & A. S. Hunt, Oxyrynchus Papyri XI, (London 1915), pp. 9-12
- Size: 13 x 25
- Type: Alexandrian text-type
- Category: I

Papyrus 27 (in the Gregory-Aland numbering), designated by 𝔓^{27}, is an early copy of the New Testament in Greek. It is a papyrus manuscript of the Epistle to the Romans, it contains only Romans 8:12-22.24-27; 8:33-9:3.5-9. The manuscript paleographically has been assigned to the early 3rd century. It is written in 43 lines per page. The scribe of this manuscript may have also written 𝔓^{20}.

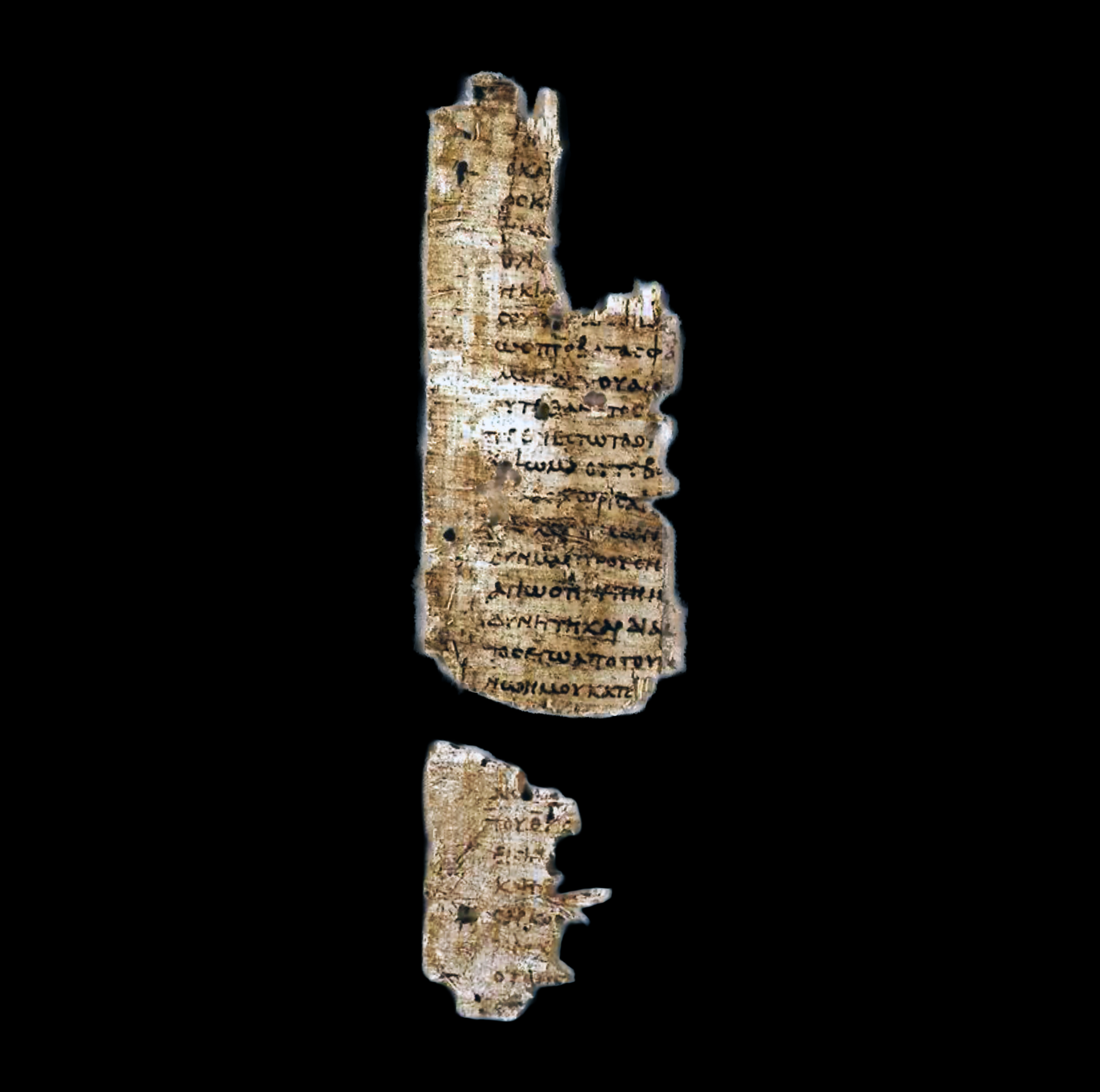
Verso Romans 8:33-9, 9

The Greek text of this codex is a representative of the Alexandrian text-type. Aland placed it in Category I. This manuscript shows agreement with Codex Sinaiticus, Vaticanus and other witnesses of the Alexandrian text-type.

It is currently housed at the Cambridge University Library (Add. 7211) in Cambridge.

== See also ==
- List of New Testament papyri
- Romans 8, 9
