= Natural History Museum, Prague =

Czech museum institution

Natural History Museum
- Přírodovědecké muzeum
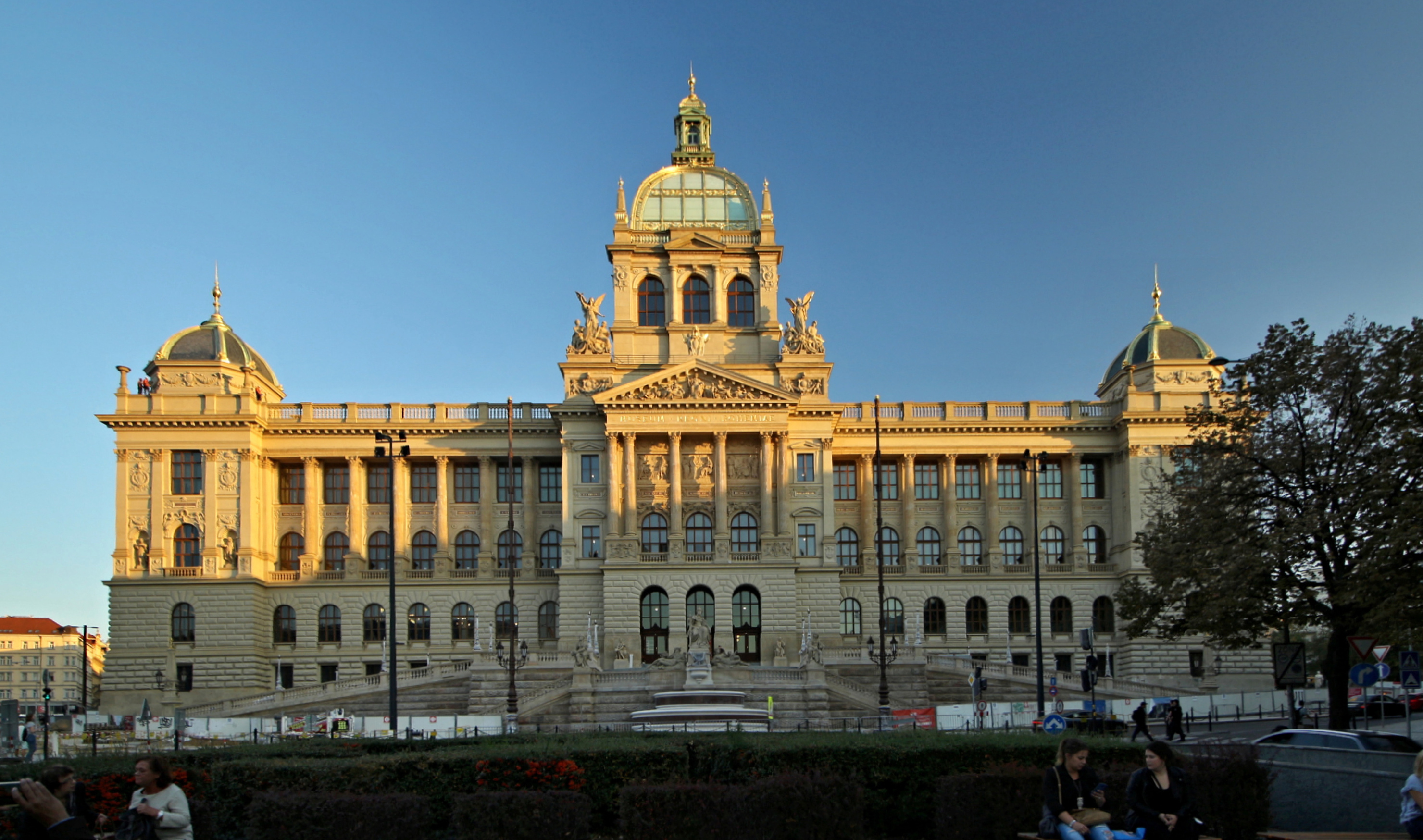
- The historic building of the National Museum in which are the exhibitions of the Natural History Museum
- Established: 1964
- Location: Prague, Czech Republic
- Coordinates: 50°4′44″N 14°25′51″E
- Collection size: 15 million items
- Website: www.nm.cz/prirodovedecke-muzeum#zveme-vas

The Natural History Museum (Czech: Přírodovědecké muzeum) is a museum in Prague in the Czech Republic. It is one of the five components of the National Museum and currently consists of eight departments: the Mineralogical and Petrological, Paleontological, Mycological, Botanical, Entomological, Zoological, Anthropological, and the Ringing Station. The Natural History Museum employs over 80 people, and its collections contain more than 15 million objects, of which only a fraction are exhibited. Ivo Macek has been the director of the museum since 2015.

The museum's activities fulfill three main tasks:

- It expands and manages natural history collections and continuously documents nature in the Czech Republic and abroad.
- It scientifically processes its collections and organizes its own research at the international level.
- It presents its own collections and scientific activities to the general public through expositions, exhibitions, popular educational publications, lectures, and accompanying programs to expositions and exhibitions. It also involves the public in scientific research through citizen science projects.

== History ==
Natural sciences, with their rich collections, have been one of the main focuses of the National (originally Patriotic) Museum since its foundation in 1818. Kaspar Maria von Sternberg, a versatile naturalist and a leading figure among the founders of the museum, played a significant role in this.

Thanks to the generous donations of the founders and members of the Society of the Patriotic Museum in Bohemia, the museum has had an extensive collection since its foundation. In the second half of the 19th century, the museum could already be described as a major European institution. Its collections consisted of natural objects from practically all over the world. Next to Charles University, the museum was the main center of natural sciences in the Czech lands, and the names of leading natural scientists are closely connected with it (besides Kaspar Maria von Sternberg, August Carl Joseph Corda, Carl Borivoj Presl, Jan Svatopluk Presl, Franz Xaver Maximilian Zippe, Maxmilian Dormitzer, August Emanuel von Reuss, Jan Krejčí, and Antonín Frič).

On January 28, 1851, an independent Natural Science Board started functioning at the museum, bringing together the various natural science disciplines and organizing scientific and popularization activities. One hundred years later, a group of departments focusing on natural sciences was established within the National Museum. However, the Natural History Museum was not formally established as an independent organizational unit of the National Museum until 1 May 1964.

=== Skeleton of the "whale" ===
A distinctive landmark of the zoological exhibitions in the historical building of the National Museum is the 22.5 meters long, over four-ton skeleton of the whale (Balaenoptera physalus). The whale's body washed up on the southwest coast of Norway in November 1885. The complete skeleton was later offered by the Norwegian Whaling Society to European museums for the relatively high price of 2,500 guilders. Václav Frič, brother of the then director of the zoological and paleontological collections, Antonín Frič, helped raise the necessary funds by organizing a collection among prominent Prague townspeople. The skeleton was presented to the public in November 1888 in the then Náprstek Industrial Museum on Betlémské náměstí. Since 1893, the skeleton has been exhibited in the present-day Historical Building of the National Museum.

== Locations ==
The current headquarters of the Natural History Museum is located in the Prague district of Horní Počernice on the site of the former wintering ground of the Czechoslovak State Circus and Variety Theatre. Following the reconstruction of the Historical Building, the collections and workplaces were moved to the existing premises in 2001–2011, where the construction of new buildings in 1996–2001 increased the capacity of the premises. Currently, there are seven departments of the Natural History Museum in Horní Počernice (excluding the Ringing Station), including depositories and technical facilities. The premises are not open to the public.

== Department ==
=== Department of Mineralogy and Petrology ===
The Department of Mineralogy and Petrology, which manages six separate collections, has been operating under this name since 1893. The department includes the mineralogical collection, which represents the oldest collection of the National Museum. The collection was built and managed by such prominent personalities as Franz Xaver Maxmilian Zippe and Professor Karel Vrba.

The mineralogical collection of the National Museum includes about 1,800 mineral species and is traditionally ranked among the ten most important mineral collections in the world.

The petrological collection comprises 25,000 rock specimens, mostly from Czech and foreign localities, documenting the rock composition of the Earth's crust.

The geological collection contains more than 3,700 rock specimens, which can be used to demonstrate various geological processes.

The collection of cut gemstones includes 4,850 inventory items of cut gemstones from all over the world.

The meteorite collection contains 500 examples of Czech and world meteorites of various types.

The collection of tektites includes 23,000 specimens of mainly Czech and Moravian vltavins and foreign tektites.

In addition to managing and replenishing the collections, the staff of the Mineralogical and Petrological Department are engaged in research, scientific, and publication activities. Museum mineralogists are authors or co-authors of descriptions of 25 new mineral species. They also publish popularization articles and books, which are supplemented with photographs of objects from the collections managed by the Mineralogical and Petrological Department. The department staff provides consultations to the public, closely cooperates with the mineralogical section of the Society of the National Museum, and participates in the preparation of exhibitions of natural science and historical interest.

=== Paleontology Department ===
The Paleontological Department was established in 1864, but for many years it operated in association with the Zoological Department and as the Geological and Paleontological Department. The modern history of the Paleontological Department began in 1964.

The collections of the department comprise about five million specimens, mainly from the Czech Republic, but there are also important foreign collections. The collections are continuously replenished both by collections of the department staff and donations and purchases from institutions, scientists, and private collectors. Among the most important collections of the Paleontological Department are, among others, the paleobotanical collection of Kaspar Maria von Sternberg, the collection of protohistoric invertebrates of Joachim Barrande, and the collection of fossil animals of the Czech permocarbon by Antonín Frič. The most scientifically valuable part of the collection is the extensive collection of material comprising over 2,500 pieces.

In addition to fossils, the department also preserves a large amount of field and collection documentation, documents for paleontological works, personal equipment of leading personalities of Czech paleontology, and an extensive collection of scientific illustrations and pictorial reconstructions.

Paleontology Department staff is engaged in the study of the taxonomy, morphology, ontogeny, and phylogeny of animal and plant groups throughout their geological history (from the Protohistoric to the Quaternary) and in the reconstruction of the environment in individual geological periods. The workload, in addition to the actual management of the collections, also includes field research in the Czech Republic and abroad, development of methods for the protection of the collections, and digitization of the collections and popularization of natural sciences.

=== Mycology Department ===
The Mycology Department, which has existed independently since 1965, focuses on building collections, scientific study, popularization, and raising awareness of fungi and lichens. The department's collection contains about 600,000 herbarium items, liquid specimens, and models of fungi. The collection has about 7,000 items and is still being added to.

One of the most valuable and rare collections of the mycological department is the material described by Auguste C. J. Corda. At the beginning of the 20th century, Josef Velenovský, a professor at Charles University, also enriched the collections of the National Museum. The collections were expanded by collections of the department's staff, exchanging items with foreign experts, and duplicates sent to Albert Pilát and Mirko Svrček by mycologists worldwide.

Whole collections of famous Czech lichenologists (Jindřich Suza, Miroslav Servít, and Václav Kut'ák) and one war confiscate in the form of part of Oscar Klement's collection were purchased for the lichenological herbarium.

The Natural History Museum owns a rare collection of original illustrations of fungi by several important authors. These include masterful watercolors by Otto Ušák, gouaches by Bohuslav Dvořák, and watercolors and drawings by Rudolf Veselý.

Currently, the staff is mainly engaged in taxonomy, floristics, and ecology of selected groups of fungi and research on taxonomy, ecology, and floristics of lichens. In addition, the staff is merging the herbarium of the individual subcollections, adding new acquisitions, and digitizing the collections themselves.

=== Botanical Department ===
The botanical collections were based on the extensive European herbarium and the valuable natural history library of Kaspar Maria von Sternberg, one of the museum's founders. The collections of the Botanical Department comprise over two million herbarium items, liquid specimens, and samples of wood and dried fruits from all over the world.

Systematically, flowering plants, ferns, mosses, and algae are represented in the collections; geographically, Central Europe, the Balkan Peninsula, Central Asia, Mongolia, and Siberia are the most represented.

The most important collections include the herbarium collection of Tadeáš Haenke from the Pacific coast of the Americas, the Mariana Islands and Luzon, the Australian collection of Karel Domin, the collections from Iran and Iraq of Jiří Soják and Emil Hadač, and the Waldstein herbarium from the territory of historical Hungary.

The herbarium of the Botanical Department contains the world's most important collection of the genus Potentilla.

The entire collection contains a large amount of material of various kinds; an estimated 30,000. The Botanical Department also maintains the most important Czech and one of the most important Central European collections of botanical literature of the 17th to 19th centuries.

The department's staff is mainly concerned with the taxonomy and ecology of Central European vascular plants, the evolution, phylogeny and taxonomy of tropical monocotyledons, especially those of the ginger family (Zingiberaceae), and the digitisation and online accessibility of the valuable collections held in the department's collections.

=== Department of Entomology ===
The Entomology Department was separated from the Zoology Department in 1953. The department's collections include more than seven million specimens from all over the world and are divided into seven referees according to the zoological system: the straight-winged (Orthopteroid orders), the hemipteran (Hemiptera), the palm-winged (Hymenoptera), the beetles (Coleoptera), the butterflies (Lepidoptera), the dioecious (Diptera), and the so-called "small orders referee" bringing together the remaining less numerous groups.

Due to the traditional interest of collectors, beetles and butterflies predominate in collections, but in recent decades, increased attention has been paid to expanding collections of other insect orders. The collections include entomological collections of some well-known Czech travelers, e.g., the collection of Jan Vilém Helfer from Burma or Emil Holub from South Africa, materials from natural history expeditions to Iran, collections of former and current staff of the department, and dozens of specialized collections of Czech amateur and professional entomologists. Among the most attractive is the collection of dwarf beetles of the founder of the Entomology Department, Professor Jan Obenberger.

The research activities of the Entomology Department are mainly focused on fields that cannot do without extensive collections, i.e., systematics, comparative morphology, and zoogeography of various insect groups.

=== Zoology Department ===
Although the first zoological exhibits were donated to the museum's collections as early as 1818, the Zoological Department was not separated until 1864 in conjunction with the Paleontological Department. The department has been functioning independently since 1895. The zoological collection is divided into five departments, which manage specialized collections of mammals (mammalological and osteological collections), birds (ornithological collection), amphibians and reptiles (herpetological collection), fish vertebrates (ichthyological collection) and all invertebrates, except insects (evertebrate collection).

The collections of the Zoology Department include over 1.1 million items from all over the world. Annual additions exceed 10,000 specimens. The collections also include many hundreds of type specimens from the Czech Republic and abroad. The staff of the department is currently working mainly on systematics, evolution, ecology and biogeography of fish, amphibians, reptiles, birds, mammals and spiders. They also study the molecular phylogeny of fish, reptiles and bats. Biodiversity conservation is also an integral part of the department's work.

=== Anthropology Department ===
Anthropology Department, which was established in 1967, is dedicated to the study of human populations. The collections of the Anthropology Department comprise about 30,000 items, mainly from the Czech Republic. They can be divided into four basic units.

These are evidence of the phylogenetic development of primates and humans (e.g. a travertine cast of a Neanderthal human brain from the site of "Hrádok" in Gánovce near Poprad), a collection of pathological changes and abnormalities on skeletons and soft tissues of the human body from the 19th and 20th centuries (about 6,000 specimens that were transferred to the National Museum from the Second World War), a collection of the most important specimens from the 19th and 20th centuries. The collection includes casts of death masks, skulls, and hands of prominent personalities (e.g., Tomáš Masaryk, Edvard Beneš, Vítězslav Nezval, Bohuslav Martinů, Jan Evangelista Purkyně, Jaroslav Heyrovský) and facial casts of various ethnic races.

The most extensive anthropological subcollection is represented by skeletal remains of populations dating from the Early Stone Age to the Modern Age. Since its establishment, the department has collected about 23,000 skeletal finds or urn graves, which it has obtained mainly from archaeological excavations in the territory of the former Czechoslovakia, later the Czech Republic. The research activities of the department are mainly focused on the biological variability of populations from the Neolithic to the present, the study of the health status of our ancestors with regard to the history of medicine, the study of the remains of important personalities and the study of human phylogeny, especially the early forms of anatomically modern humans living in the upper phase of the older Stone Age.

=== Ringing station ===
The ringing station is located in the arboretum of the National Museum in the Prague 10 – Hostivař district. It was affiliated with the Natural History Museum in 1964 and has been operating as an independent department since 1991.

The main task of the station is to ring wild bird species in the Czech Republic to monitor their migration. The actual ringing in the field is carried out by about 450 trained volunteers who annually mark more than 200,000 individuals (over 200 bird species). The data collected are compiled in a computer database, which currently contains more than 3 million records of ringed birds.

Once a year, selected data are sent to the central European EURING databank in the UK and used for further scientific evaluation. The processing of all ringing data collected since the beginning of ringing resulted in the Atlas of Bird Migration of the Czech Republic and Slovakia, published in 2008.

In addition to ringing data management, the Ringing Station staff is involved in other scientific projects, such as monitoring population trends and migration of selected bird species using geolocators.

== Science and research ==
With its scientific outputs, the Natural History Museum ranks among the most important research institutions in the Czech Republic. Its staff participates in the projects of the Grant Agency of the Czech Republic, projects of the Ministry of Culture of the Czech Republic (NAKI), and others.

Within the framework of international and domestic cooperation and exchange of experience, the museum cooperates with foreign institutions (mainly from Australia, Germany, Slovakia, the US, and France), as well as with individual researchers who frequently visit and study natural history collections. The museum staff organizes or participates in a number of foreign expeditions outside the Czech Republic (e.g., Morocco, Peru, Laos, South Arabia, and Papua New Guinea).

The Horní Počernice site is a modern research and collection building facility with specialized equipment, which allows the museum staff to study, among other things, the detailed morphology of samples, the texture and structure of crystalline materials, and the relative average atomic weight of a sample. They are able to obtain information on the concentrations of the individual elements present in a sample, detect X-rays, determine the precise quantitative chemical composition of a sample or identify substances by measuring and comparing their spectra, and observe the surface of three-dimensional objects in great detail (up to 20,000 x).

The Natural History Museum is one of three Czech institutions — together with the Faculty of Science of Charles University and the Institute of Botany of the CAS — involved in the international taxonomy consortium CETAF.

The museum is also involved in the SYNTHESYS project, which provides infrastructure between European research institutions. The project brings together 20 European museums, universities, botanical gardens, and other institutions which, thanks to financial support from the European Union, can be visited by naturalists from all over the world.

Other international projects in which the Natural History Museum has been involved include the European Migration Atlas, the Volkswagen Stiftung, and European Creative.

== Citizen Science ==
The Natural History Museum has traditionally organized citizen science projects in which the general public participates to a greater or lesser extent in the process of scientific research. By involving a large number of trained volunteers, naturalists gain a wealth of important data, and participants learn skills about the process of scientific inquiry. One such project, for example, is bird ringing, in which trained volunteers have participated since 1914.

In 2018, the Natural History Museum participated for the first time in the international City Nature Challenge project, which aims to bring the general public and the natural history community together in a collaborative activity of observing urban nature. Using the iNaturalist app, interested people take photos of nature in their neighborhood, providing valuable data for professional naturalists.

A number of citizen science projects are currently underway and, based on similar projects abroad and the positive public response, which is reflected in the increasing number of visitors to the museum, it is likely that the museum will continue these projects.

== Directors of the Natural History Museum ==
=== Term of office ===
- 1 August 1964 – 31 December 1964: Otakar Štěpánek
- 1 January 1965 – 28 February 1970: Jiří Kouřimský
- 1. March 1970 – 30 June 1971: Vlastislav Zázvorka
- 1 July 1971 – 5 September 1972: Jiří Kouřimský
- 1 October 1972 – 14 August 1975: Adolf Čejchan
- 1 September 1975 – 31 January 1990: Radvan Horný
- 15 March 1990 – 31 January 1991: Milan Stloukal
- 1 March 1991 – 30 June 2001: Jiří Čejka
- 1 July 2001 – 31 January 2014: Jiří Litochleb
- 1 February 2014 – 30 September 2015: Jiřina Dašková
- 1 October 2015 – 30 November 2015: Petr Velemínský
- 1 December 2015 – present: Ivo Macek

== Exhibition activities ==
The collections of the Natural History Museum are presented to the public mainly in the form of exhibitions and displays in the Historical Building and the New Building. The Natural History Museum has recently organized or co-organized the following exhibition projects:

- 2022: The Earth Is Me), an exhibition that gives visitors a practical insight into how each of us can contribute to environmental protection.
- 2021–present: Windows into Prehistory, an exhibit dedicated to life on our land many millions of years ago.
- 2021–present: The miracles of Evolution, an exhibition introducing visitors to the wealth of species that have arisen as a result of different evolutionary pathways.
- 2019: The Age of Genes, an exhibition showcasing the evolution of DNA research and its practical applications.
- 2017: Light and Life, an exhibition dedicated to the adaptations of organisms to (in)sufficient light.
- 2015–2018: Noah's Ark, an exhibition dedicated to the biogeography, diversity, and conservation of the world's fauna.
- 2015–2016: Death, an exhibition presenting death as an integral part of life.
- 2015: What Will It Be Called, an exhibition dedicated to types and nomenclature in the natural sciences.
- 2009–2010: Come With Us to the Cave, an exhibition introducing the mysterious world of caves and the efforts of Czech speleologists in discovering them.
- 2009–2010: The Story of Planet Earth, an exhibition dedicated to the evolution of the Earth and life on it.
- 2008: Dinosaurs from Argentina, an exhibition presenting casts of the skeletons of 12 dinosaur species from various Argentinian sites.
- 2006: Postcards from our Carboniferous Forests, an exhibition introducing visitors to life in the Carboniferous period.

== Periodicals ==
The results of the research activities of the different departments are presented at conferences and mainly in scientific literature. The National Museum publishes the following journals on natural science topics:

- Acta Entomologica Musei Nationalis Pragae, an impacted journal, published since 1923, publishes entomological papers.
- Fossil Imprint (formerly Acta Musei Nationalis Pragae, Series B-Historia Naturalis), peer-reviewed journal, published since 1938, publishes articles on paleontology and related disciplines.
- Journal of the National Museum (Prague), Natural History Series, peer-reviewed journal, published since 1827, publishes articles on all areas of natural sciences.
- Lynx, new series, peer-reviewed journal, published since 1959, publishes articles on mammals.

== Literature ==
- Anděra, M., Bukovanská, M., Burdová, P., Čejka, J., Dobisíková, M., Formánek, J., Heráň, I., Holec, J., Jelínek, J., Kůrka, A., Kuželka, V., Litochleb, J., Moravec, J., Pfleger, V., Prokop, R., Skočdopolová, B., Straková, M., Šreinová, B. a Velemínský, P. (1999): Průvodce – Přírodovědecké muzeum. Národní muzeum, Prague, 1–82.
- Kouřimský, J. (1968): Přírodní vědy v Národním muzeu. V: Burian, M. a Špét, J: Sborník 150 let Národního muzea v Praze, 33–40.
- Kvaček, J. a Pátová, R. (1998): Kašpar M. hrabě Sternberg. Národní muzeum, Prague, 1-106.
- Kvaček, J., Bouda, F., Hájek, J., Holec, J., Kment, P., Kuželka, V., Kvaček, J., Macek, I., Sejkora, J., Šída, O., Šmíd, J. a Velemínský, P. (2015): Typové sbírky Národního muzea. Národní muzeum, Prague, 1–114.
- Sklenář, K. (2001): Obraz vlasti. Paseka, Prague and Litomyšl, 1–424.
- Sklenář, K. (2007): Společnost Národního muzea v dějinách i v současnosti. Společnost Národního muzea a Artsci, Prague, 1–96.
- Štěpánek, O. (1969–1970): Stopadesát let zoologie Národního muzea v Praze (1818–1968). Časopis Národního muzea, oddíl přírodovědný 138–139, 1–159.
- Typový katalog (Type catalogue).
