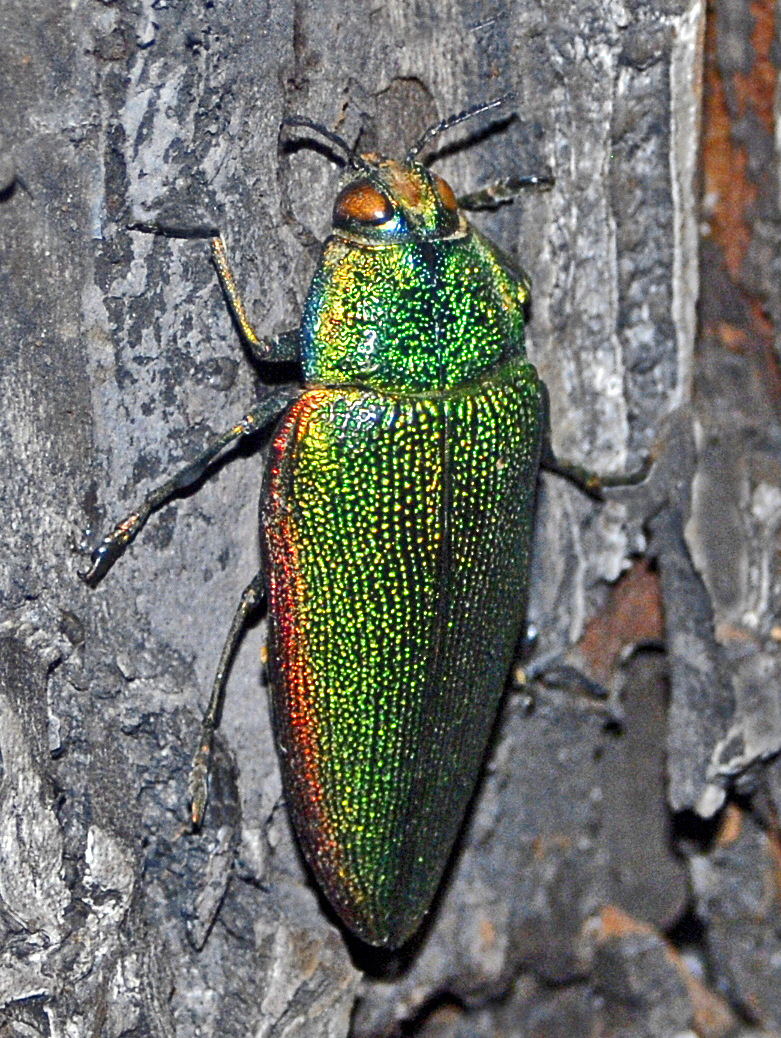
- Steraspis squamosa

Scientific classification
- Kingdom: Animalia
- Phylum: Arthropoda
- Clade: Pancrustacea
- Class: Insecta
- Order: Coleoptera
- Suborder: Polyphaga
- Infraorder: Elateriformia
- Family: Buprestidae
- Genus: Steraspis
- Species: S. squamosa

Binomial name
- Steraspis squamosa (Klug, 1829)

= Steraspis squamosa =

Species of beetle

Steraspis squamosa or the Middle Eastern jewel beetle is a beetle of the Buprestidae family.

== Description ==
Steraspis squamosa can reach a length of about 27–38 millimetres (1.1–1.5 in). These beetles usually have a metallic green or bluish color with orange margin along the edges of the elytra and a rugose surface. They primarily feed on Tamarix, Rhus tripartita and Acacia. They lay the eggs on tree branches and the caterpillars drill hatching holes in the trunk. At the end of the process the insect bursts the bark and a new life cycle begin. The full life cycle last two years. Adult beetles are active in spring.

== Distribution ==
This species is present in the northern part of Africa, particularly from Red Sea, Sinai, Israel and Egypt to Syria, Mauritania, Algeria and Morocco.

== Subspecies ==
- Steraspis squamosa kindermanni Marseul, 1865
- Steraspis squamosa squamosa (Klug, 1829)

== Cultural significance ==
This beetle is likely the particular species of buprestid beetle depicted in ancient Egyptian art. It feeds on the tamarisk tree, boring holes into it for their larvae to pupate. The larvae emerge once mature as beetles. As such they were likely identified with Osiris, who was imprisoned in a tamarisk tree in some versions of the myth where he is killed by Set. The beetle was associated with rebirth as a result, and jewelry with the beetles was often found with mummies.

The beetle appears as part of the pins on Queen Hetepheres bed canopy, and as part of a 6th dynasty broad collar.

== Gallery ==
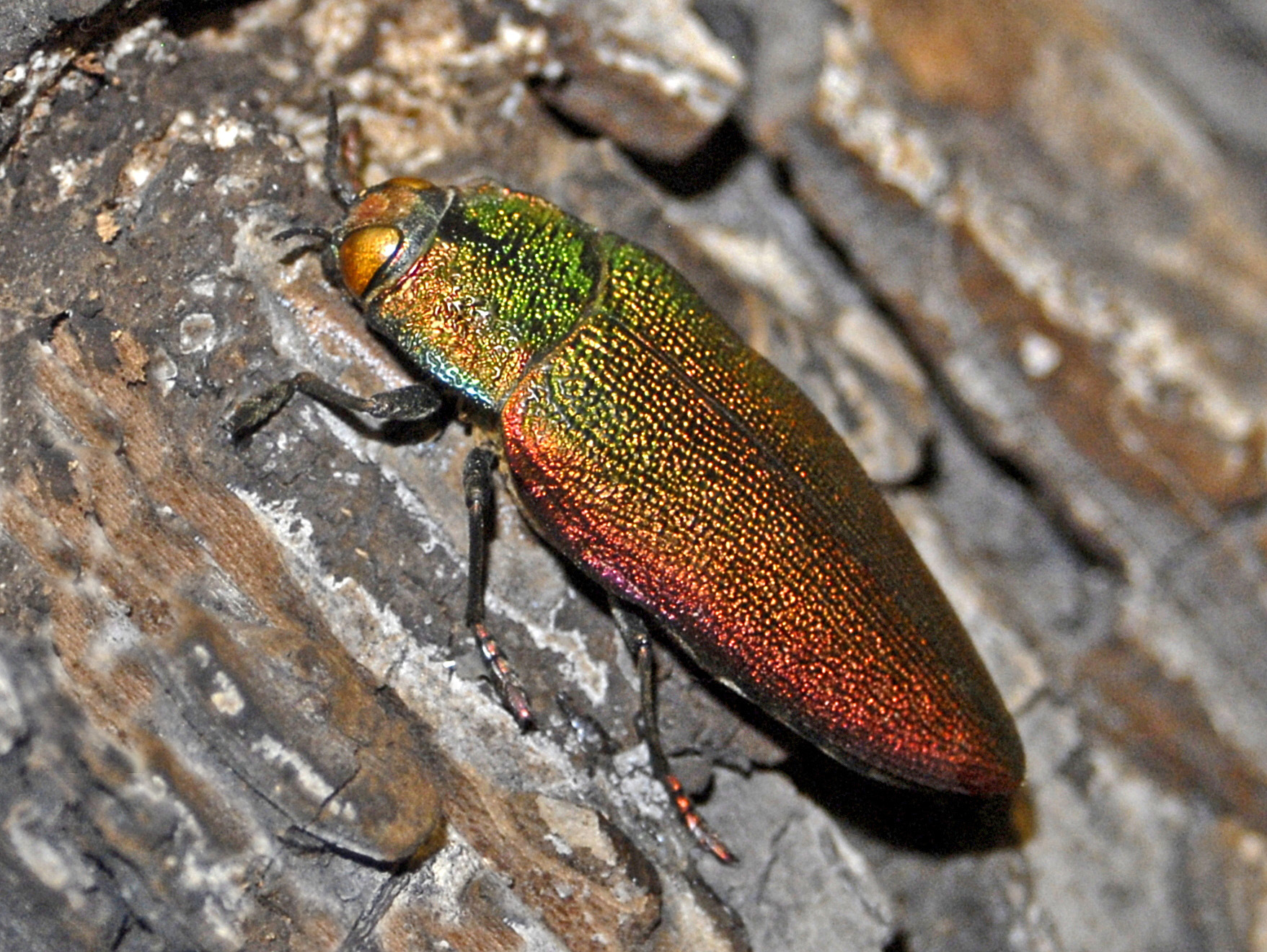
Steraspis squamosa

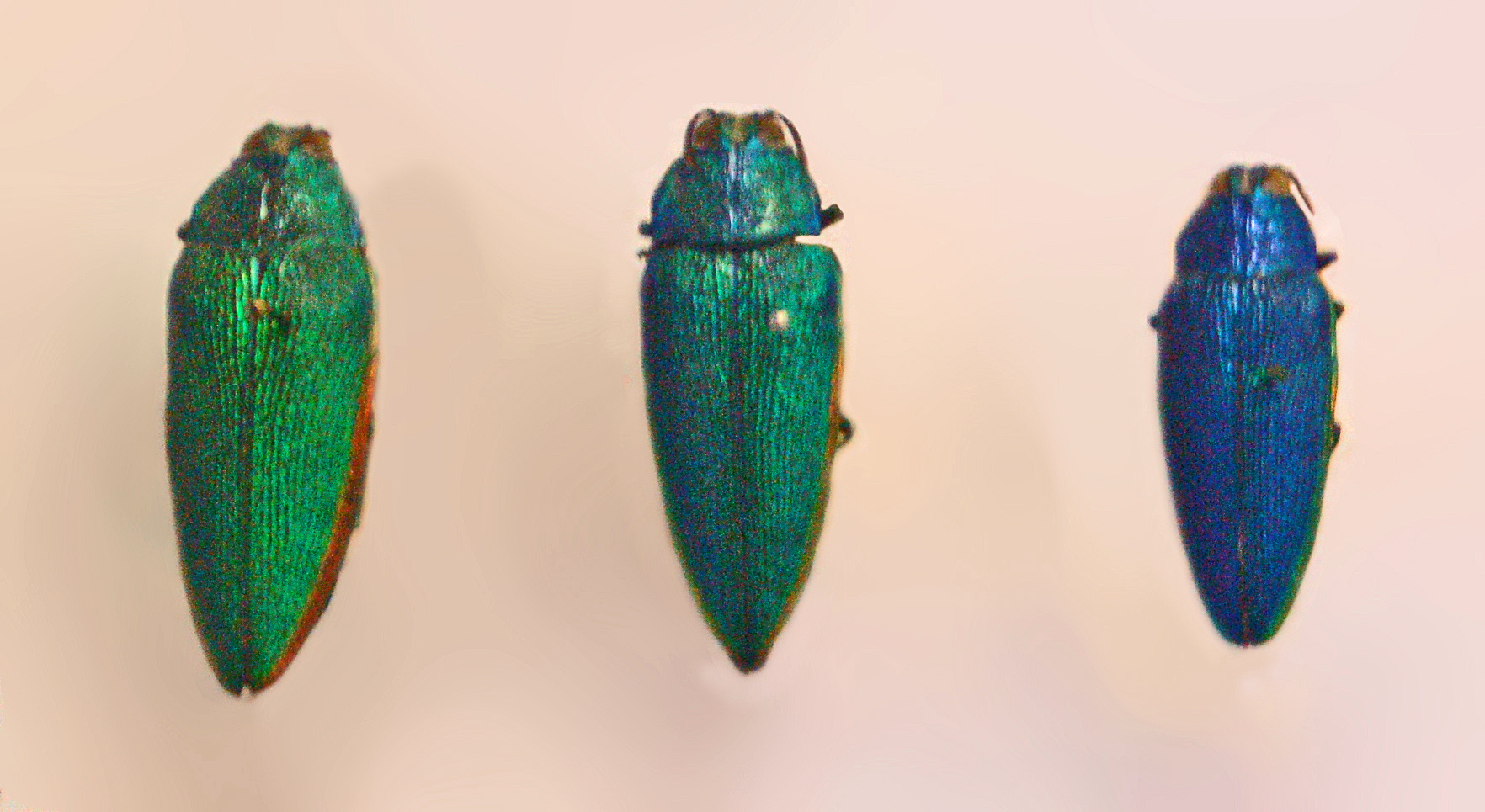
Steraspis squamosa from Syria, mounted specimen at National Museum (Prague)

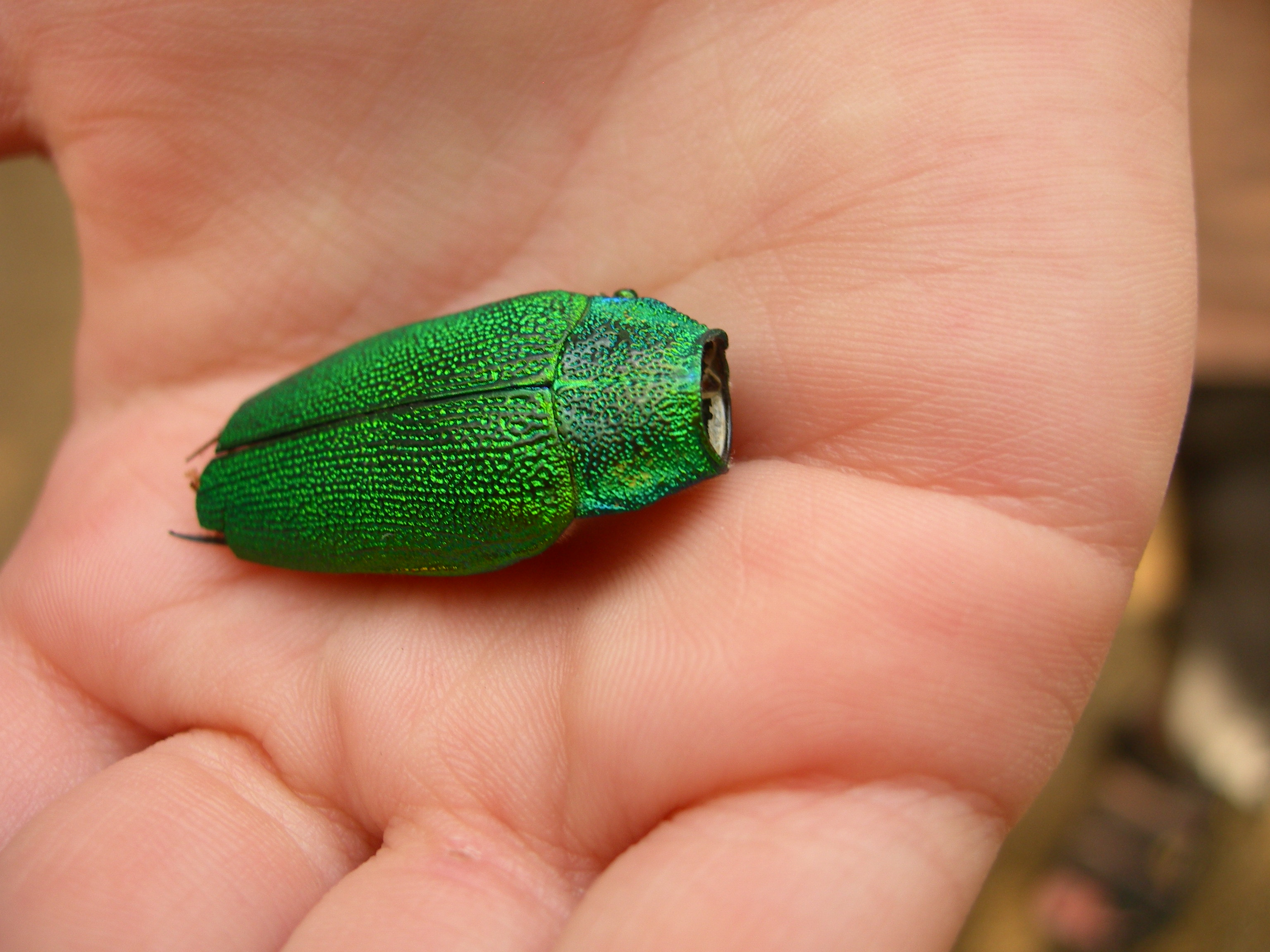
Steraspis squamosa
