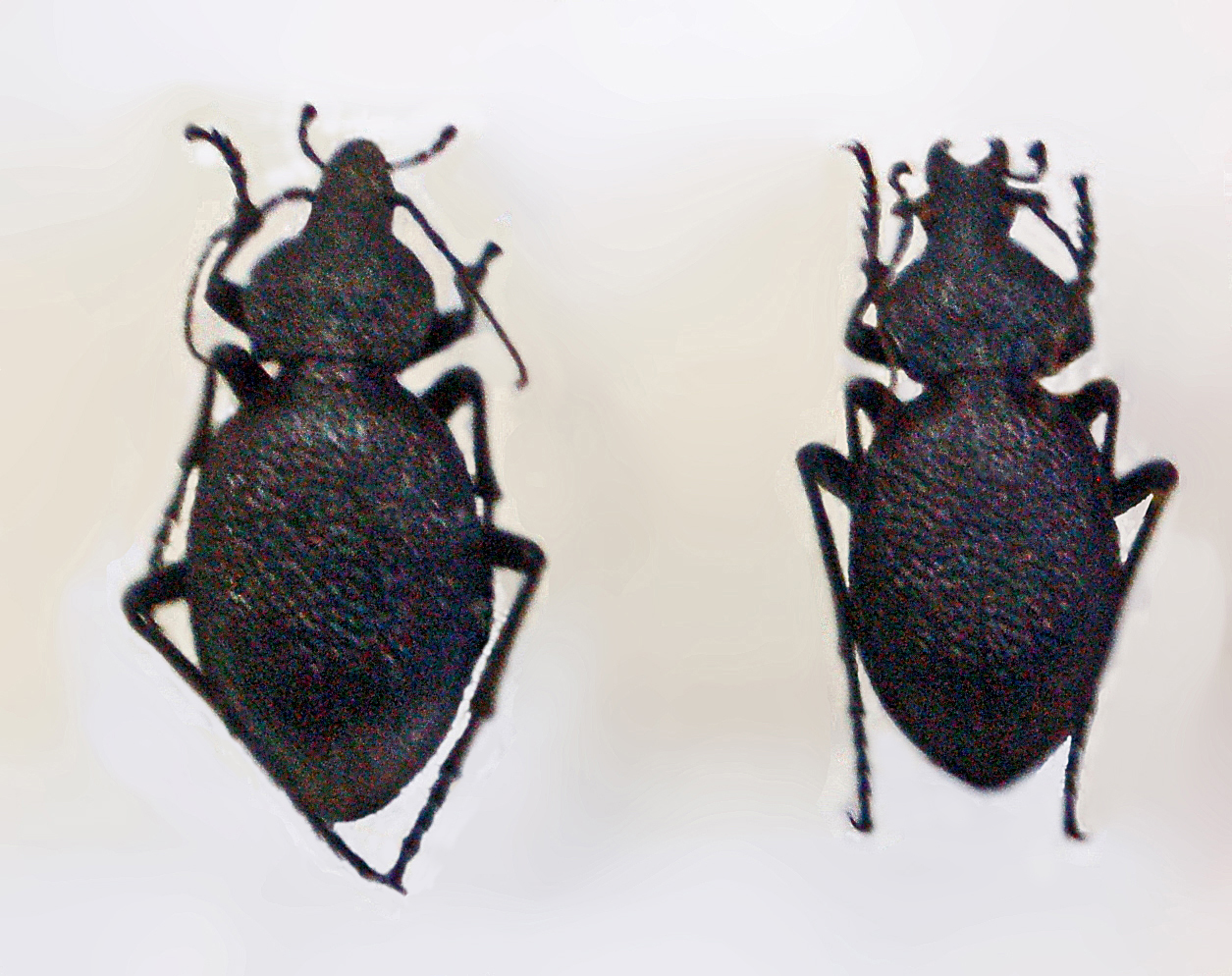
- Carabus gigas male and female, at National Museum (Prague)

Scientific classification
- Kingdom: Animalia
- Phylum: Arthropoda
- Clade: Pancrustacea
- Class: Insecta
- Order: Coleoptera
- Suborder: Adephaga
- Family: Carabidae
- Genus: Carabus
- Species: C. gigas

Binomial name
- Carabus gigas Creutzer, 1799

Synonyms
- Carabus (Procerus) gigas; Procerus gigas

= Carabus gigas =

Species of beetle

Carabus gigas is a species of beetles of the family Carabidae.

== Description ==
Carabus gigas is the largest European ground beetle, reaching a length of about 40–70 millimetres (1.6–2.8 in). The upper surface is black and glossy. The elytra are oval, strongly convex and covered with about 15 rows of more or less small tubercles. Also the pronotum has a granular surface. The adults reach the age of 3 years or more. These beetles primarily feed on snails.

== Distribution ==
This species is endemic to Europe and occurs in South-East Europe and in Central Europe, the range extends into Styria and Carinthia. It is observed in Albania, Austria, Bosnia and Herzegovina, Bulgaria, Croatia, mainland Greece, Hungary, mainland Italy, North Macedonia, Romania, Republic of Moldova, Serbia and Slovenia.

== Habitat ==
Carabus gigas lives in moist and subalpine highlands.

== Subspecies ==
- Carabus g. duponcheli, Dejean, 1831 (Southern Greece)
- Carabus g. parnassicus, Kraatz, 1884 (Greece, North Macedonia, southern Albania)

== Gallery ==
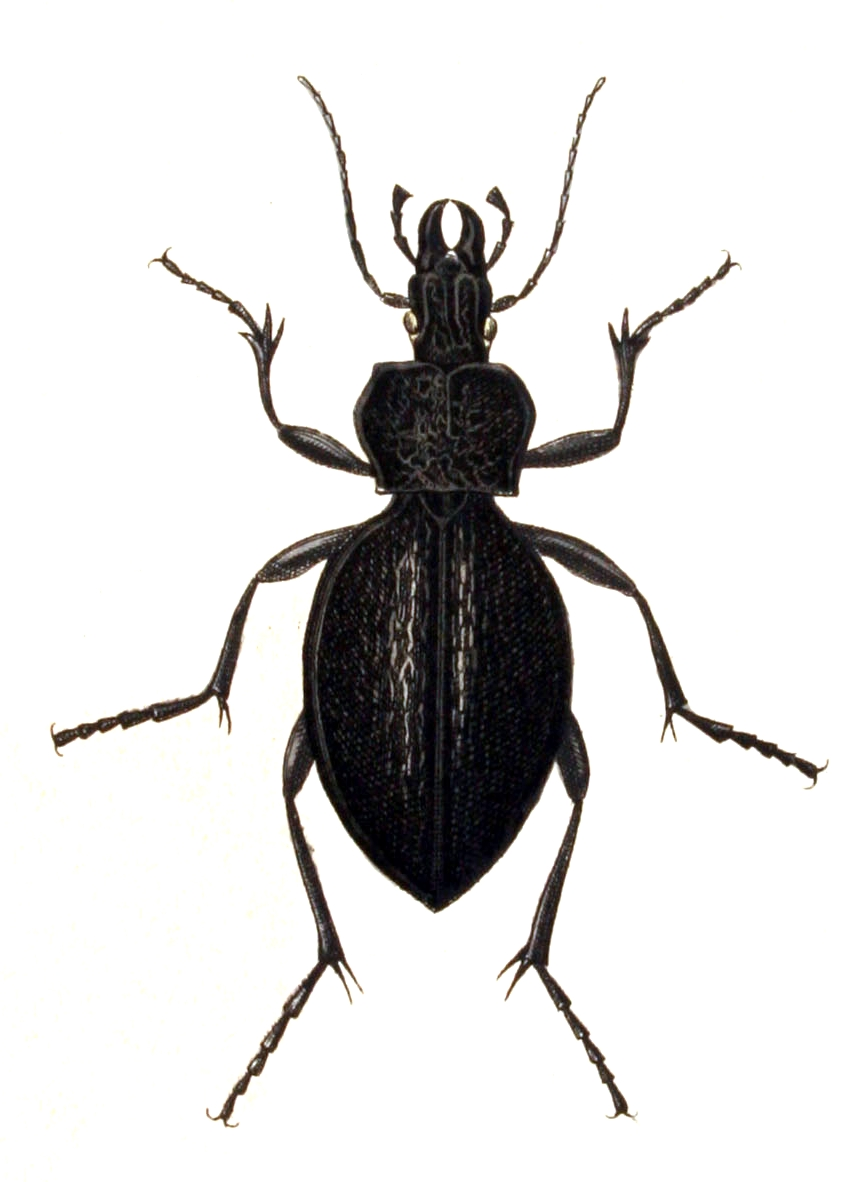
Illustration of Carabus gigas from Carl Gustav Calwer and Gustav Jäger, "Naturgeschichte der Käfer Europas" (1876), Table 1, Picture 13.

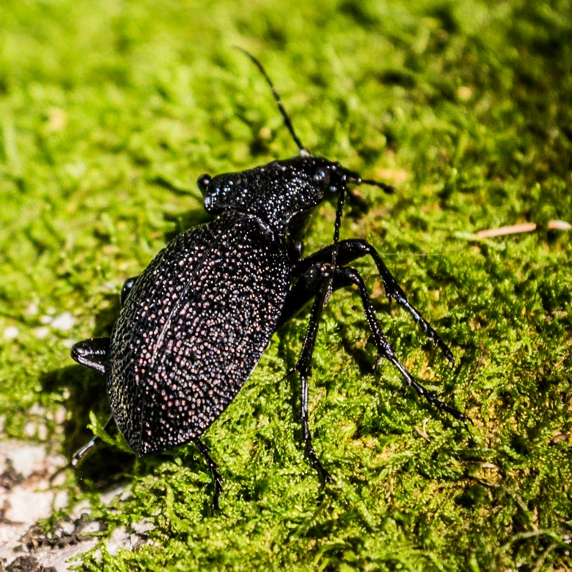
In Mehedinți Mountains, Romania
