= Acta Entomologica Musei Nationalis Pragae =

- Discipline: entomology
- Language: English
- Edited by: Petr Kment

Publication details
- History: 1923–present
- Publisher: National Museum (Prague) (Czech Republic)
- Frequency: biannually
- Open access: Delayed (2 year embargo)
- Impact factor: 0.963 (2012)

Standard abbreviations
- ISO 4: Acta Entomol. Musei Natl. Pragae

Indexing
- Acta Entomologica Musei Nationalis Pragae
- ISSN: 0374-1036 (print); 1804-6487 (web)
- Sborník entomologického oddělení Národního muzea v Praze
- ISSN: 0862-0423

Links
- Journal homepage

Acta Entomologica Musei Nationalis Pragae (AEMNP) is an academic journal that publishes entomological papers focused on taxonomy, morphology and phylogeny. It was founded in 1923, and was originally published under the title Sborník entomologického oddělení Národního muzea v Praze.

From 2008 onwards, it is published biannually at the end of June and December.

Authors must use English language, and follow the International Code of Zoological Nomenclature.
