= Opatovice nad Labem =

- Municipality
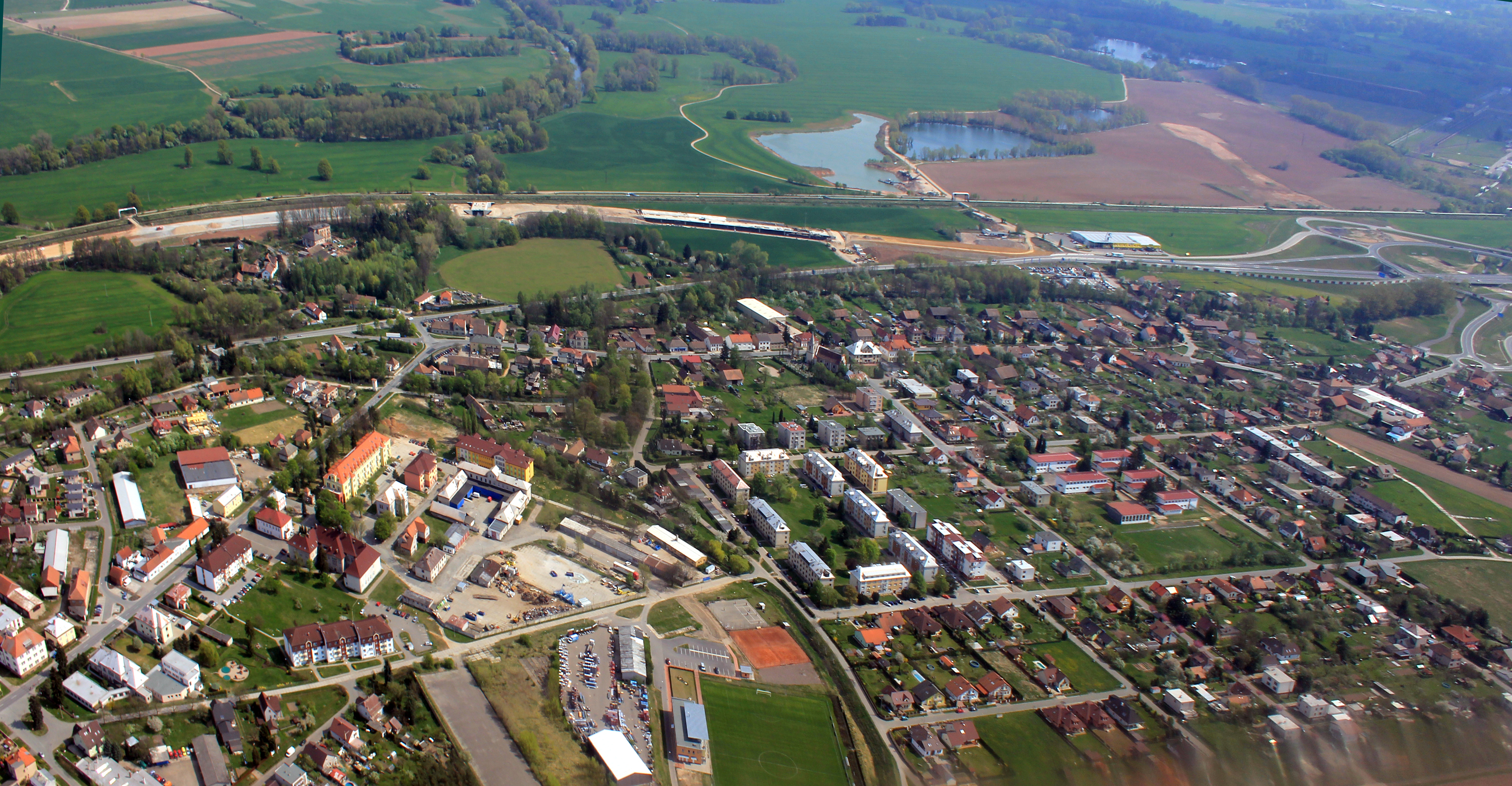
- Aerial view

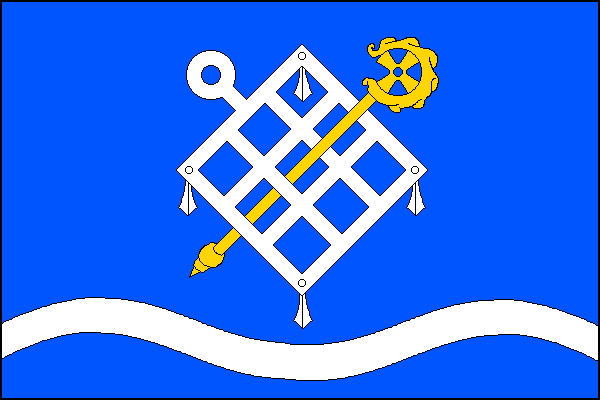
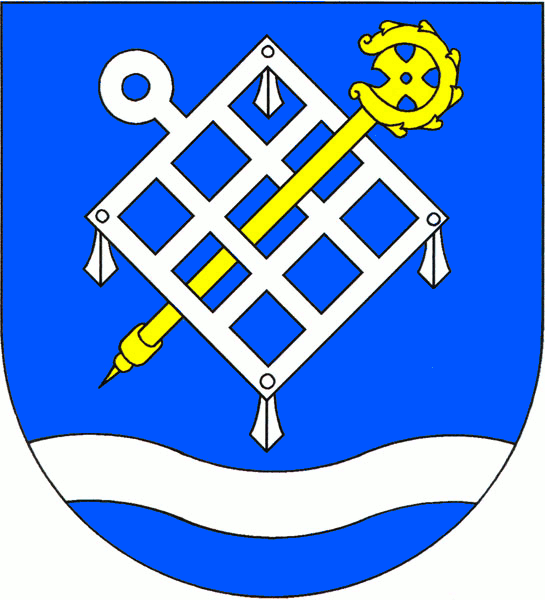
- Flag Coat of arms

- Location in the Czech Republic
- Coordinates: 50°8′44″N 15°47′26″E
- Country: Czech Republic
- Region: Pardubice
- District: Pardubice
- First mentioned: 1073

Area
  - Total: 12.01 km^{2} (4.64 sq mi)
- Elevation: 225 m (738 ft)

Population (2026-01-01)
  - Total: 2,968
  - Density: 247.1/km^{2} (640.1/sq mi)
- Time zone: UTC+1 (CET)
  - Summer (DST): UTC+2 (CEST)
- Postal code: 533 45
- Website: www.opatovicenadlabem.cz

Opatovice nad Labem is a municipality and village in Pardubice District in the Pardubice Region of the Czech Republic. It has about 3,000 inhabitants.

== Administrative division ==
Opatovice nad Labem consists of two municipal parts (in brackets population according to the 2021 census):

- Opatovice nad Labem (2,195)
- Pohřebačka (591)

== Etymology ==
The name Opatovice is derived from the Czech word opatství, i.e. 'abbey'. It indicated a village in the vicinity of the monastery that was founded here.

== Geography ==
Opatovice nad Labem is located about 11 kilometres (7 mi) north of Pardubice and 6 km (4 mi) south of Hradec Králové. It lies in a flat landscape in the East Elbe Table and is situated on the right bank of the Elbe River. There are several flooded quarries used for recreational purposes. The largest of them is Opaťák in the northern part of the municipality.

The Opatovice Canal flows through the village. It was built in the 15th century to supply a large fishpond system and is a cultural technical monument. Today it is 26 km (16 mi) long.

== History ==
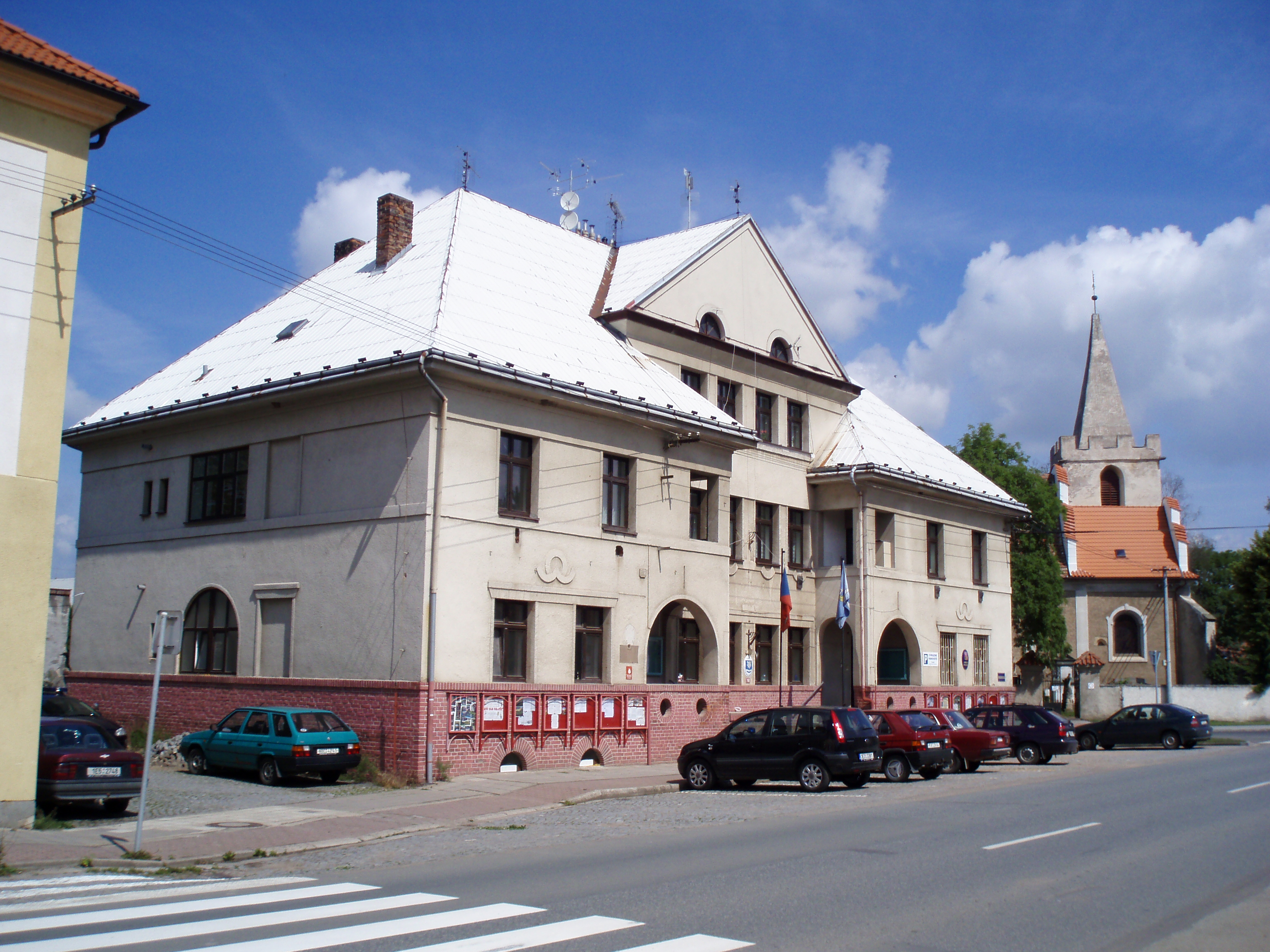
Town hall and Church of Saint Lawrence

Archaeological research confirmed that mild climate and fertile surroundings of the Elbe had been exploited by ancient peoples. The first written mention of Opatovice nad Labem is from 1073, when Benedictine monks founded here a monastery. The Opatovice Monastery was finished in 1086 and existed until 1421, when it was burned down by the Hussites.

In the 15th century, the village was shortly owned by Diviš Bořek of Miletínek and by George of Poděbrady, and in 1491, it was acquired by the Pernštejn family. The Pernštejns built here the first weir on the Elbe and the Opatovice Canal to feed the local system of breeding fishponds. In 1560, however, they lost the manor for financial reasons and it was acquired by the royal chamber. During the Thirty Years' War, Opatovice was looted by the Swedish army.

== Demographics ==
Historical population

Year	Pop.	±%
1869	1,027	—
1880	1,328	+29.3%
1890	1,264	−4.8%
1900	1,592	+25.9%
1910	1,624	+2.0%

Year	Pop.	±%
1921	1,498	−7.8%
1930	1,856	+23.9%
1950	1,570	−15.4%
1961	1,943	+23.8%
1970	1,967	+1.2%

Year	Pop.	±%
1980	2,072	+5.3%
1991	1,951	−5.8%
2001	2,180	+11.7%
2011	2,553	+17.1%
2021	2,786	+9.1%

Source: Censuses

== Economy ==
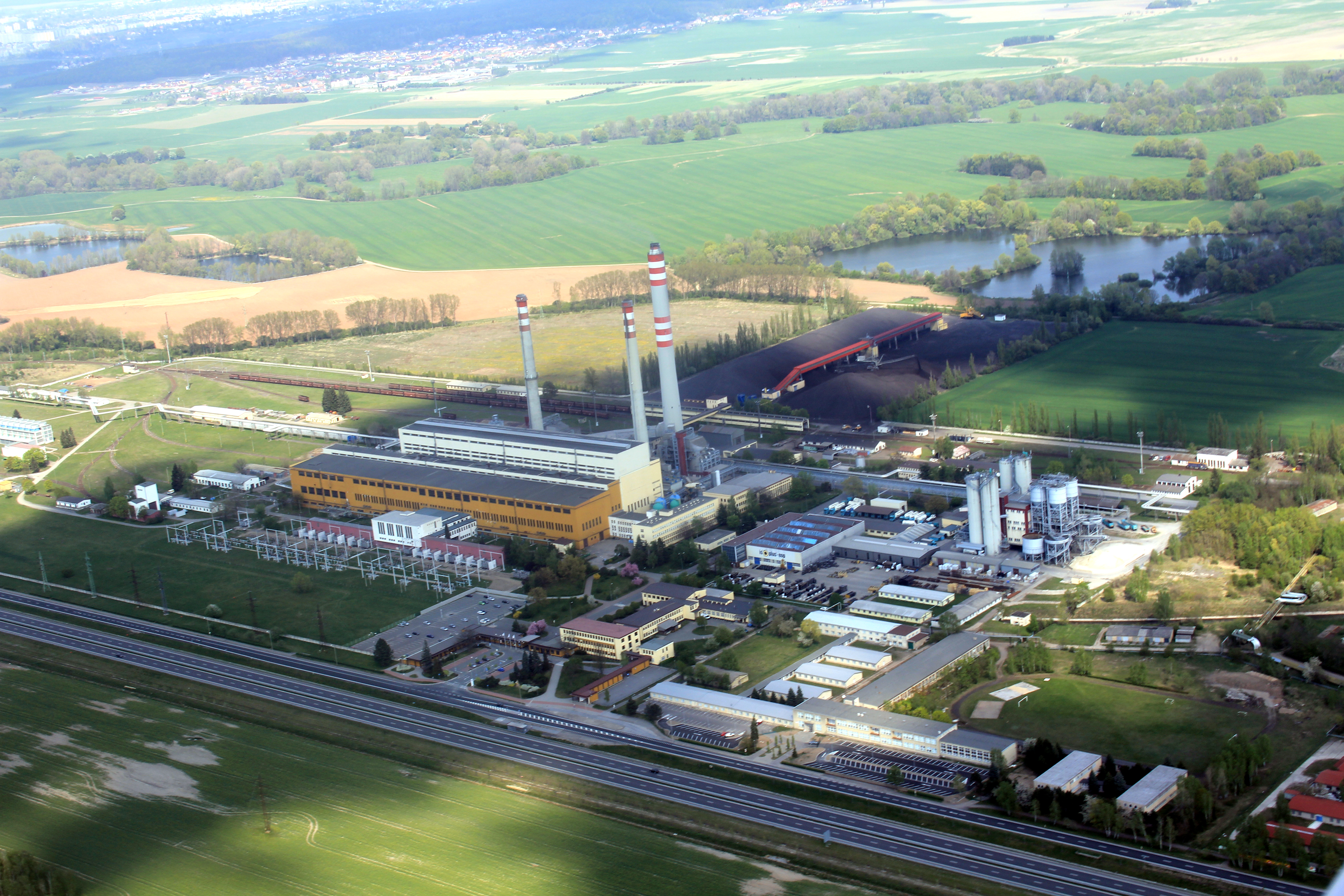
Opatovice Power Plant

Opatovice nad Labem is known for its large power station that was first activated in 1959.

== Transport ==
The D35 motorway runs through Opatovice nad Labem. The municipality is known for commissioning one of the largest road junctions in the country.

== Sights ==
The main landmark is the Church of Saint Lawrence. It was built in the Gothic style in the second half of the 13th century and rebuilt in 1421. The current appearance is a result of the Baroque reconstructions in the second half of the 18th century.

== Notable people ==
- Emanuela Nohejlová-Prátová (1900–1995), numismatist, archaeologist and historian
