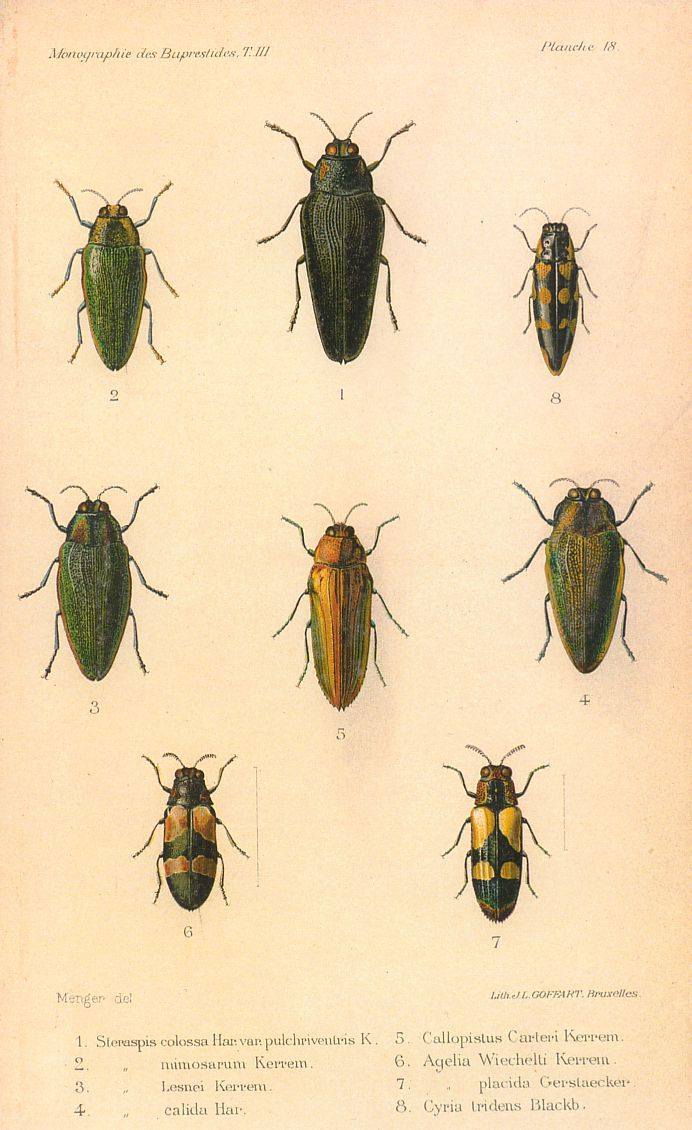

Scientific classification
- Kingdom: Animalia
- Phylum: Arthropoda
- Class: Insecta
- Order: Coleoptera
- Suborder: Polyphaga
- Infraorder: Elateriformia
- Family: Buprestidae
- Genus: Steraspis; Dejean, 1833

= Steraspis =

Genus of beetles

Steraspis is a genus of beetles in the family Buprestidae, containing the following species:

- Steraspis aeruginosa Klug, 1855
- Steraspis ambigua (Fåhraeus in Boheman, 1851)
- Steraspis ambiguoides Kerremans, 1908
- Steraspis amplipennis (Fåhraeus in Boheman, 1851)
- Steraspis argodi Théry, 1901
- Steraspis brevicornis (Klug, 1835)
- Steraspis calida Harold, 1878
- Steraspis ceardi Théry, 1930
- Steraspis colossa Harold, 1878
- Steraspis confusa Bellamy, 2004
- Steraspis cupriventris Kerremans, 1914
- Steraspis divina Kerremans, 1914
- Steraspis fastuosa Gerstäcker, 1871
- Steraspis hacquardi Théry, 1932
- Steraspis hebe Kerremans, 1914
- Steraspis humeralis Kerremans, 1910
- Steraspis hyaena Thomson, 1879
- Steraspis infuscata Théry, 1908
- Steraspis jackal Thomson, 1879
- Steraspis lacustris Kerremans, 1914
- Steraspis laeviventris Kerremans, 1914
- Steraspis lesnei Kerremans, 1908
- Steraspis maunensis Obenberger, 1935
- Steraspis mimosarum Kerremans, 1907
- Steraspis modesta Kerremans, 1895
- Steraspis monardi Théry, 1946
- Steraspis nigella Kerremans, 1914
- Steraspis nigriventris Kerremans, 1914
- Steraspis ovalis Kerremans, 1914
- Steraspis parallelipennis Obenberger, 1926
- Steraspis piliventris Kerremans, 1914
- Steraspis reptilis Thomson, 1897
- Steraspis rotundata Kerremans, 1914
- Steraspis scabra (Fabricius, 1775)
- Steraspis scapha Kerremans, 1914
- Steraspis schultzei Kerremans, 1908
- Steraspis speciosa (Klug, 1829)
- Steraspis squamosa (Klug, 1829)
- Steraspis staudingeri Kerremans, 1900
- Steraspis subbrevicornis Thomson, 1879
- Steraspis viridicincta Kerremans, 1914
- Steraspis welwitschii Saunders, 1872
