= Emanuela Nohejlová-Prátová =

Czech historian and numismatist

Professor Emanuela Nohejlová-Prátová
- Born: 3 June 1900; Opatovice nad Labem, Austria-Hungary
- Died: 19 November 1995 (aged 95); Pardubice, Czech Republic
- Resting place: Pardubice Cemetery
- Education: Charles University
- Occupation: Numismatist

Emanuela Nohejlová-Prátová (3 June 1900 – 19 November 1995) was a Czech numismatist, archaeologist and historian. She is considered to be a founder of modern Czech numismatics.

== Early life ==
Nohejlová-Prátová was born on 3 June 1900 in Opatovice nad Labem, east Bohemia, then part of Austria-Hungary. Her father, Emanuel Nohejl, was the doctor and mayor for the village. Her mother was Berta Schmidt and the couple had three daughters, of which Nohejlová-Prátová was the youngest.

In 1918 Nohejlová-Prátová caught influenza as a result of the pandemic of Spanish flu that swept Europe, and this illness delayed her graduation. Nevertheless, she graduated from high school and went on the study History at the Faculty of Arts, Charles University, Prague; one of her tutors was the Czech historian, Professor J. V. Šimák. Initially, her father encouraged to Medicine like him, but she preferred History - as soon as her eldest sister settled on Medicine, it meant that Nohejlová-Prátová could pursue her historical studies. During her time at University, she became engaged, however in 1923 her fiancee died as a result of injuries received during World War I.

== Career ==
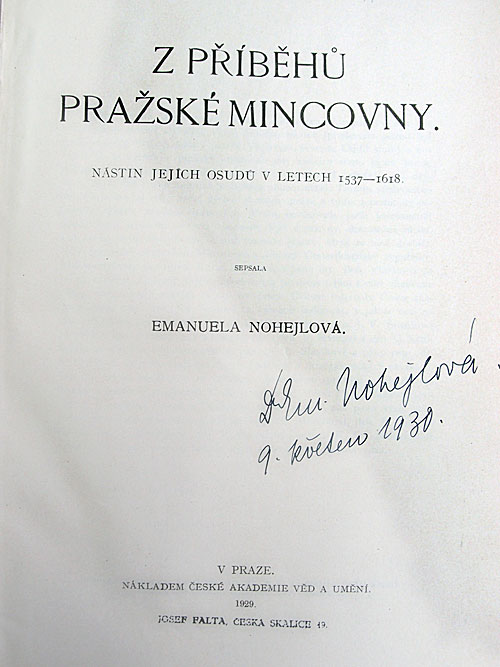
Nohejlová-Prátová's signature

By the end of her university studies, Nohejlová-Prátová had already begun to make a name for herself as an excellent historian. Her final dissertation on the history of the Opatovice monastery was published soon after she graduated.

From 1923 to 1926 she worked as a scientific officer at the National Museum in Prague. In 1926 she returned briefly to teaching in schools in Chrudim, Ivančice and Dvůr Králové, but in 1927 she returned to Prague.

In 1930 Nohejlová-Prátová was appointed as a curator in the Numismatic Department at the National Museum in Prague, where she worked until her retirement in 1959.

=== World War II ===
Nohejlová-Prátová was arrested by the Gestapo on 4 February 1942, she was interrogated at Petschek Palace and imprisoned because she had used crystals from the mineralogy department to build radios, which supplied news at odds with Nazi propaganda. She was released from prison in May 1943. At that time she was forbidden from working in Prague, but was allowed to find work elsewhere and through a connection to Professor Fritz Dworschak, director of the Kunsthistorisches Museum in Vienna, found work there for two years.

After the end of the war, her colleagues in Vienna were keen for her to remain, however Nohejlová-Prátová was keen to return to her work in Prague.

== Research ==
Nohejlová-Prátová had been a pioneer of the use of photographic enlargement in her research prior to World War II. Post-war, she returned to her job in the Department of Numismatics and began to research and catalogue the collections extensively.

In 1949 she was appointed as a lecturer at Masaryk University in Brno, alongside her museum work. She worked extensively on hoarding practices in Bohemia, Moravia and Silesia, examining deposits from the ancient period up to the nineteenth century, In her research she worked across many periods, with her specialisms lying particularly in Czech coinage, especially of Bohemia, and metrology. She was also considered an expert on medieval counterfeits. In Nohejlová-Prátová's work on Czech coinage in the tenth and eleventh century, she believed that numismatics tended to over-estimate the link between iconography and contemporary politics. In 1958 she was awarded a doctorate. In 1964 was appointed Professor at the Charles University. By 1960, she was Keeper of Numismatics and President of the Czech Numismatic Commission.

She died on 19 November 1995, aged 95, in Pardubice, Czech Republic and is buried in the cemetery there.

== Bibliography ==
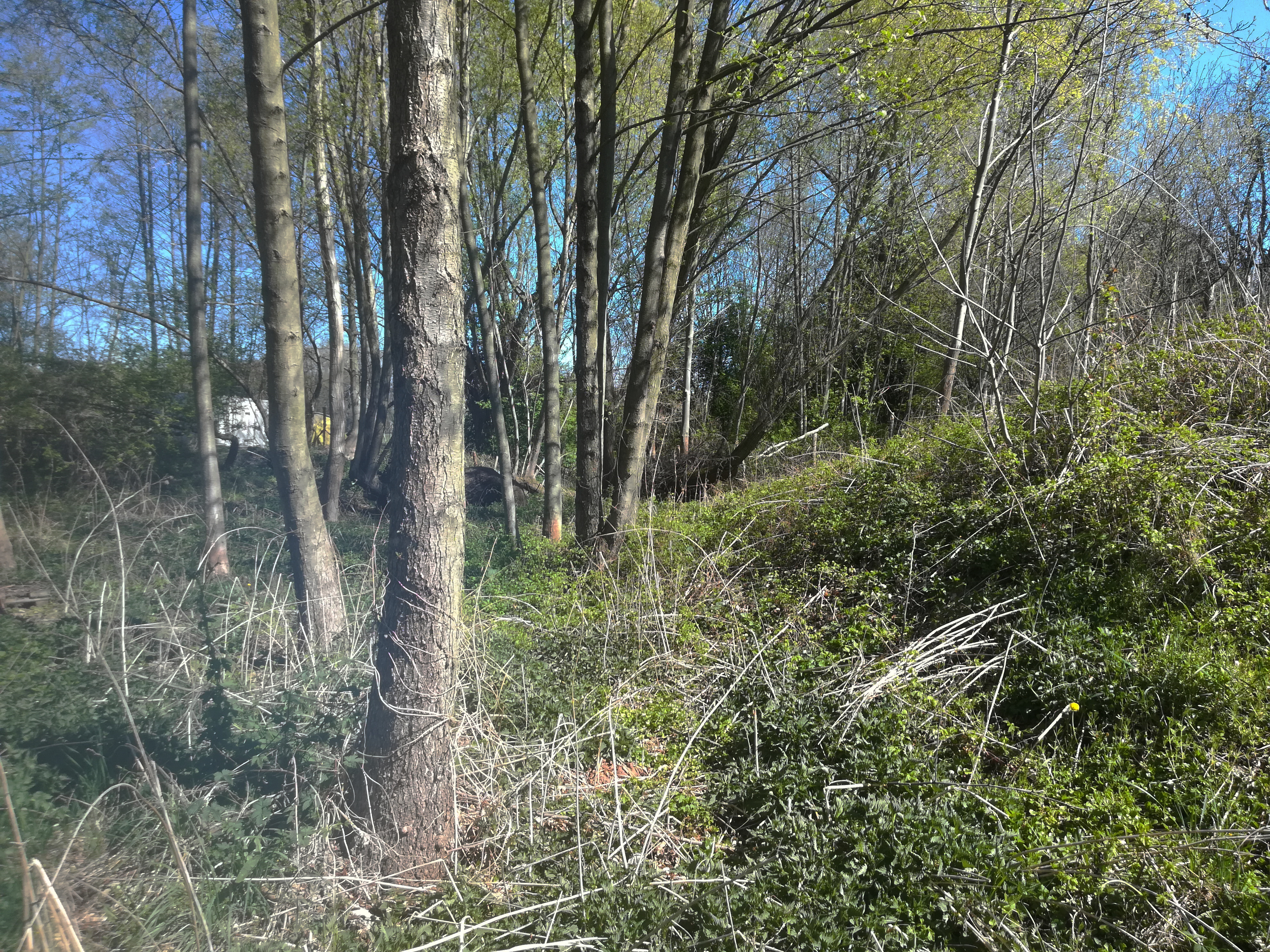
Opatovický Monastery Ruins, surveyed by Nohejlová-Prátová

A full bibliography for Nohejlová-Prátová can be found at Databáze Národní knihovny ČR. She wrote several books, including:

- Příběhy kláštera Opatovického [Stories of the Opatovický Monastery], 1925
- Z příběhů pražské mincovny [Stories of the Prague Mint], 1929
- Moravská mincovna markraběte Jošta [Moravian Mint of Margrave Jošt], 1933
- Košický poklad [Košice Treasure], 1948
- Coins Finds in Bohemia, Moravia and Silesia
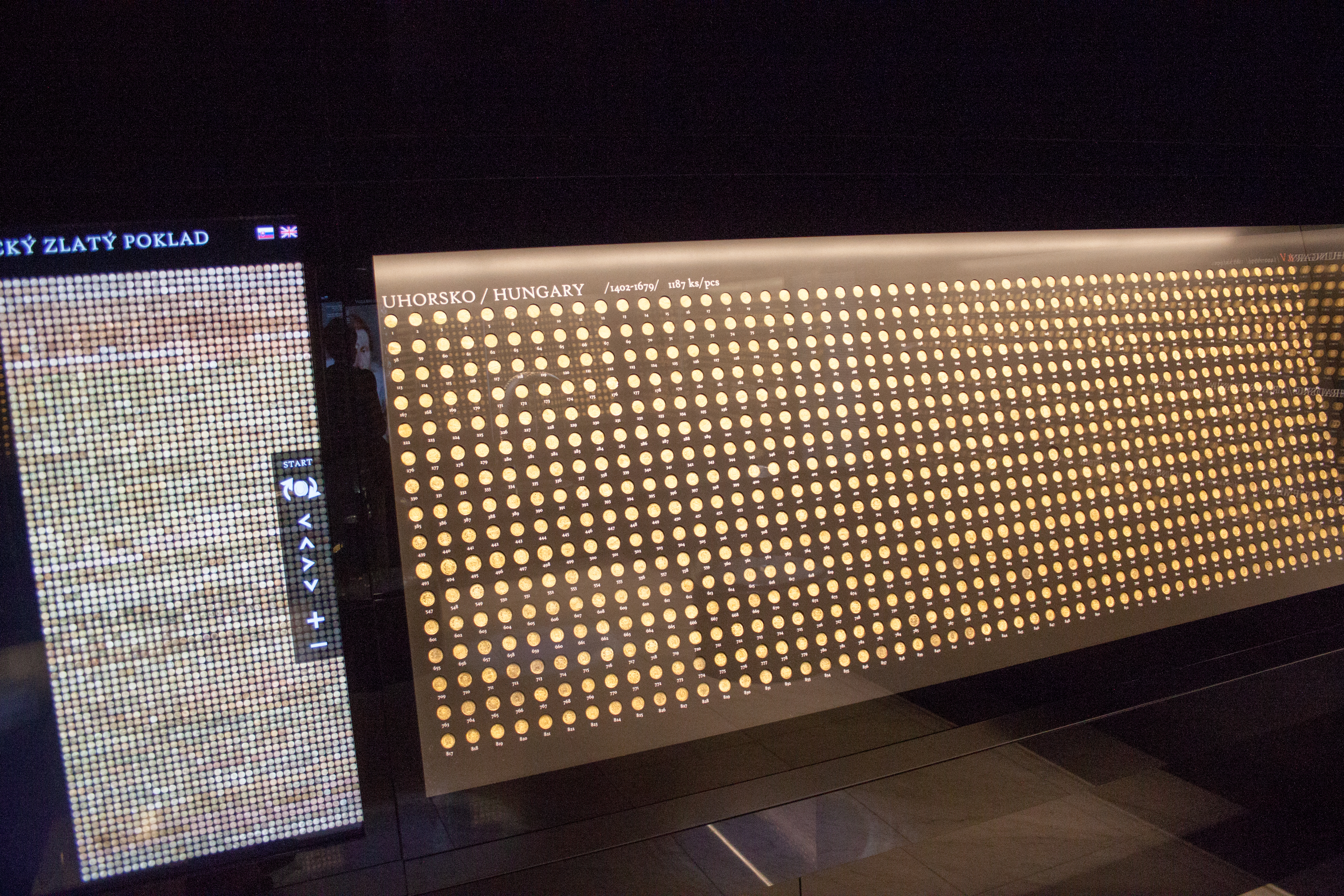
  Coins from Hungary in the Golden treasure of Kosice, researched by Nohejlová-Prátová
- Das Münzwesen Albrechts von Wallenstein, 1969
- Základy numismatiky [Fundamentals of Numismatics], 1975 (2. vyd. 1986)
- Katalog výstavní sbírky medailí
- Dvě století vědecké numismatiky v českých zemích:(1771-1971)
- "Kralovna Emma." Královny, kněžny a velké ženy české
- České medaile Severina Brachmanna

As well as many articles, such as:

- Denar of Princess Euphemia
- Poznámky o ražbách pražské mincovny [Notes on the minting of the Prague Mint], 1930
- Krátký přehled českého mincovnictví a tabulky cen a mezd
- "Rožmberské tolary." Numismatické listy
- "Kilka uwag na temat najstarszych znalezisk denarów czeskich i współczesnych znalezisk polskich
