= National Museum (Prague) =

Czech museum institution

- Národní muzeum

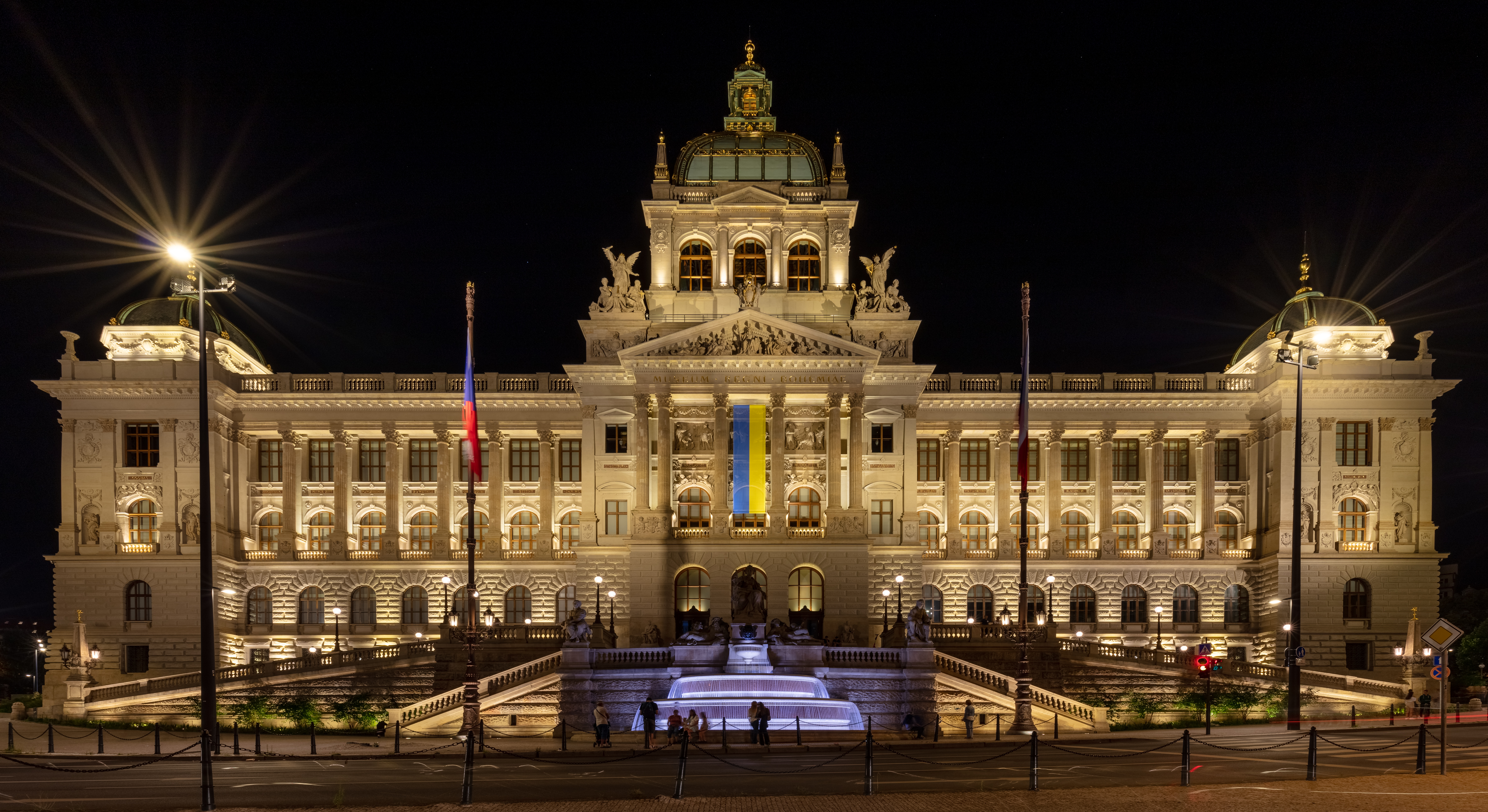
- Main building of the National Museum in 2022

- Location within Prague Location within Czech Republic
- Established: 15 April 1818
- Location: Prague, Czech Republic
- Coordinates: 50.078831°N 14.430797°E
- Collection size: 14 million items
- Website: www.nm.cz

The National Museum (NM; Czech: Národní muzeum) is a public museum dedicated to natural scientific and historical collections of the Czech Republic, its history, culture and people, among others. The museum was founded in 1818 by Kašpar Maria Šternberg. Historian František Palacký was also strongly involved in the foundation of the museum.

The National Museum houses nearly 14 million items from the areas of natural history, history, arts, music and librarianship, which are located in dozens of museum buildings.

The main hall of the National Museum is located on Wenceslas Square in downtown Prague. Built in neo-Renaissance style in 1891, the building underwent significant restoration from 2011 to 2018 to mark the centennial of the Czech and Czechoslovak declaration of independence. Due to its dominance over the busiest intersection of Prague, the National Museum building carries a significant national importance. As such, it frequently serves as a focal point for protests, rallies, gatherings and public events.

== Origins ==
Even before the French Revolution, some royal and private collections of art, science and culturally relevant items were made available to the public. The beginnings of the museum can be seen as far back as 1796 when the private Society of Patriotic Friends of the Arts was founded by Count Casper Sternberk-Manderschied and a group of other prominent nobles. The avowed purpose of the society was "the renewed promotion of art and taste". In 1800, the group founded the Academy of Fine Arts, which trained students in progressive forms of art and history.

== History and timeline ==
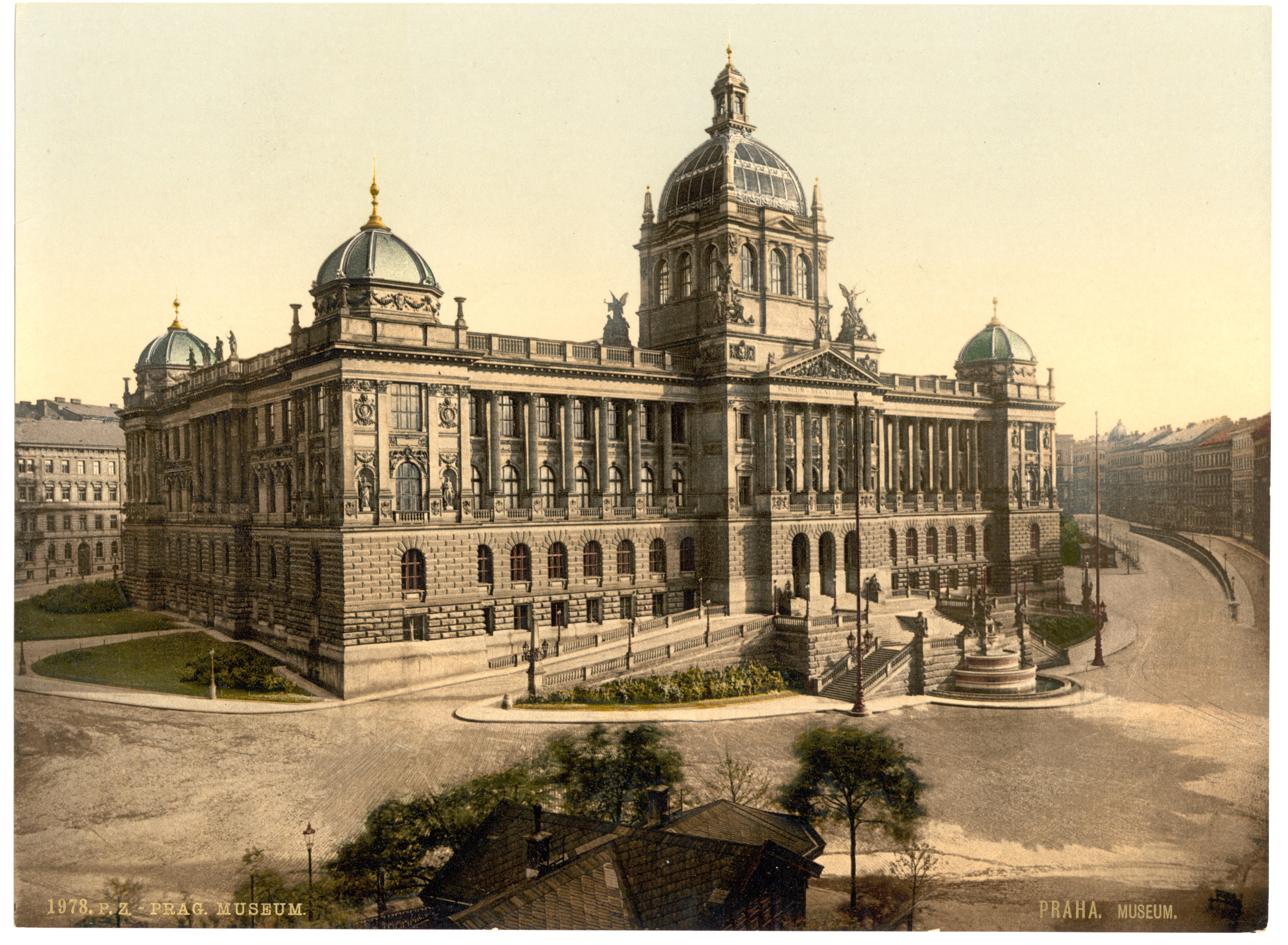
National Museum building shortly after completion in 1891

The National Museum in Prague was founded on 15 April 1818. It was founded by Count Sternberk, the first president of the Society of the Patriotic Museum who served as the trustee and operator of the museum. The early focus of the museum was natural sciences, partially because Count Sternberk was a botanist, mineralogist, and eminent phytopaleontologist, but also because of the natural science slant of the times, as promulgated by Emperor Joseph II of Austria.

The museum was originally located in the Sternberg Palace. When the venue became too small to house the museum's collections, the museum relocated to the Nostitz Palace. That too had insufficient capacity, which led to the construction of a new museum building in Wenceslas Square.

The museum did not acquire historical objects until the 1830s and 1840s, when Romanticism arose. The institution of the museum was increasingly seen as a center for Czech nationalism. Serving as historian and secretary of the National Museum in 1841, František Palacký tried to balance natural science and history, as he described in his Treatise of 1841. However, it was not until nearly a century later that the National Museum's historical treasures equaled its collection of natural science artifacts.

The museum brought about an intellectual shift in Prague. The Bohemian nobility had, until this time, been prominent, both politically and fiscally, in scholarly and scientific groups. However, the National Museum was created to serve all the inhabitants of the land, lifting the stranglehold the nobility had had on knowledge. This was further accelerated by the historian František Palacký, who in 1827 suggested that the museum publish separate journals in German and Czech. Previously, the vast majority of scholarly journals were written in German, but within a few years the German journal had ceased publication, while the Czech journal continued for more than a century.

In 1949, the national government took over the museum and detailed the museum's role and leadership in the Museum and Galleries Act of 1959. In May 1964, the Museum was turned into an organization of five professionally autonomous components, which included the Museum of Natural Science, the Historical Museum, the Naprstek Museum of Asia, African, and American Cultures, the National Museum Library, and the Central Office of Museology. A sixth autonomous unit, the Museum of Czech Music, was established in 1976.

== Buildings ==
=== Main building ===
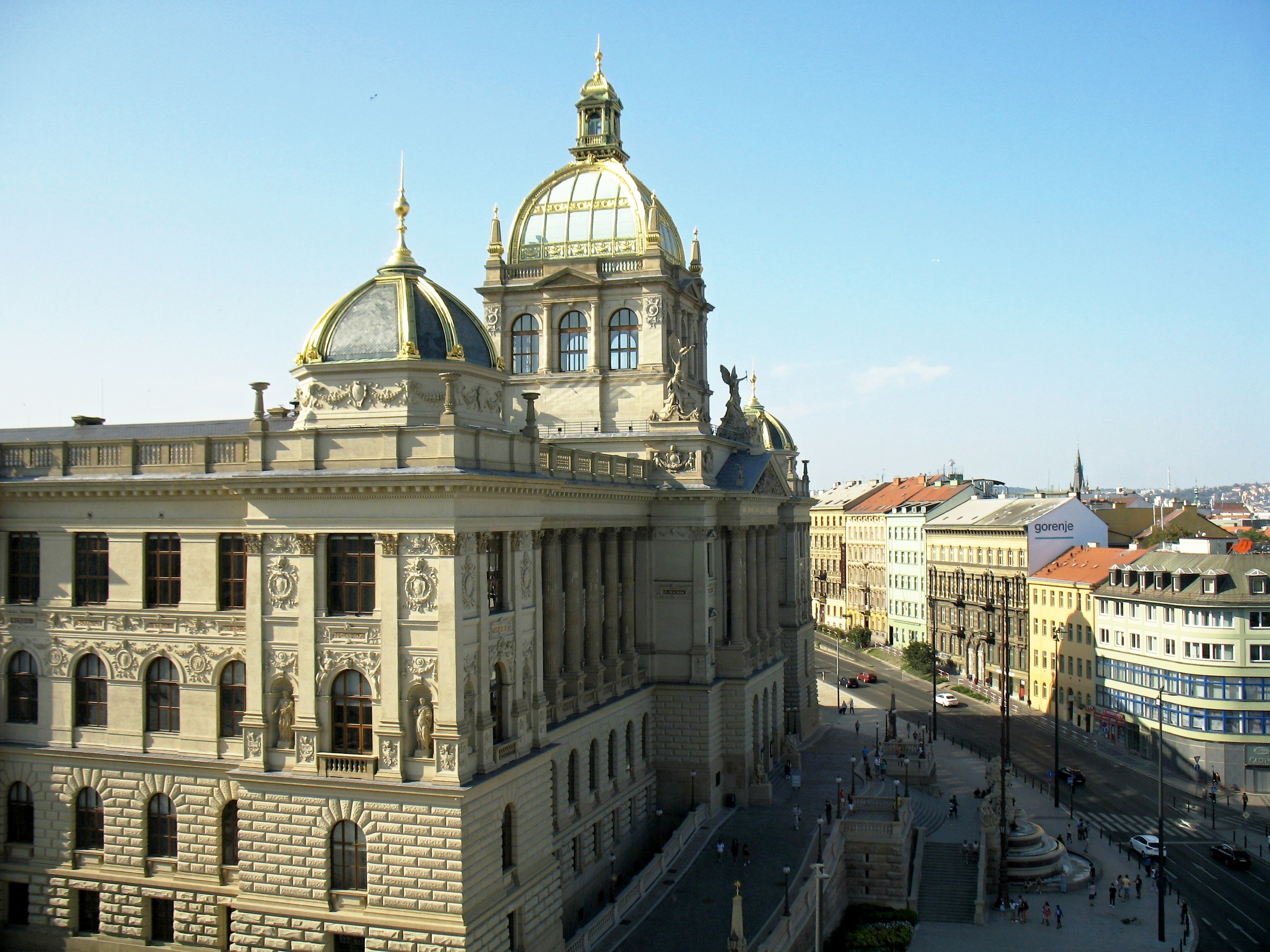
View of the Historical Building NM from the New Building NM (2019)

The Main Building of the National Museum (Historical Building) is located on the upper end of Wenceslas Square and was built by prominent Czech neo-renaissance architect Josef Schulz between 1885 and 1891. Prior to the museum being constructed, there had been several noblemen's palaces located at this site. With the construction of a permanent building for the museum, a great deal of work, which had previously been devoted to ensuring that the collections would remain intact, was now put toward collecting new materials.

The building was damaged during World War II in 1945 by a bomb, but the collections were not damaged due to their removal to secured storage sites. The museum was reopened after intensive repairs in 1947, and in 1960, exterior night floodlighting was installed, which followed a general repair of the facade that had taken place in previous years.

During the 1968 Warsaw Pact intervention, the main facade was severely damaged by strong Soviet machine-gun and automatic submachine-gun fire. The shots made numerous holes in sandstone pillars and plaster, destroyed stone statues and reliefs, and also caused damage in some of the depositories. Despite the general facade repair made between 1970 and 1972 the damage still can be seen due to the use of lighter sandstone to repair the bullet holes.

The main museum building was also damaged during the construction of the Prague Metro in 1972 and 1978. The opening of the North-South Highway in 1978 on two sides of the building resulted in the museum being cut off from city infrastructure. This also led to the building suffering from excessive noise levels, a dangerously high level of dust and constant vibrations from heavy road traffic.

Due to major reconstruction, the museum was closed between 7 July 2011 and 28 October 2018. Seven million items had to be relocated to the museum's depositories, in what was described as the biggest moving of museum collections in Czech history. In February 2019, the museum's dome, which also serves as a view of Prague, was opened for the first time. The eastern courtyard was also opened and was for the first time roofed, during reconstruction. In November 2019, the underground corridor connecting the Historical Building to the New Museum Building became accessible.

The museum was partially opened on 28 October 2018. The first permanent exhibition opened to visitors in 2020.

Permanent exhibitions:

- Halls of Minerals - an exhibition focused on minerals, opened in June 2020
- Miracles of Evolution - natural science exhibition, opened in September 2021
- Windows into prehistory - exposition of life from Protozoic era to Quaternary era, opened in November 2021
- History - the history of the Czech lands from 8th century to World War I, opened in March 2022
- People - opening not yet announced
- Jewellery - opening not yet announced

=== New building ===
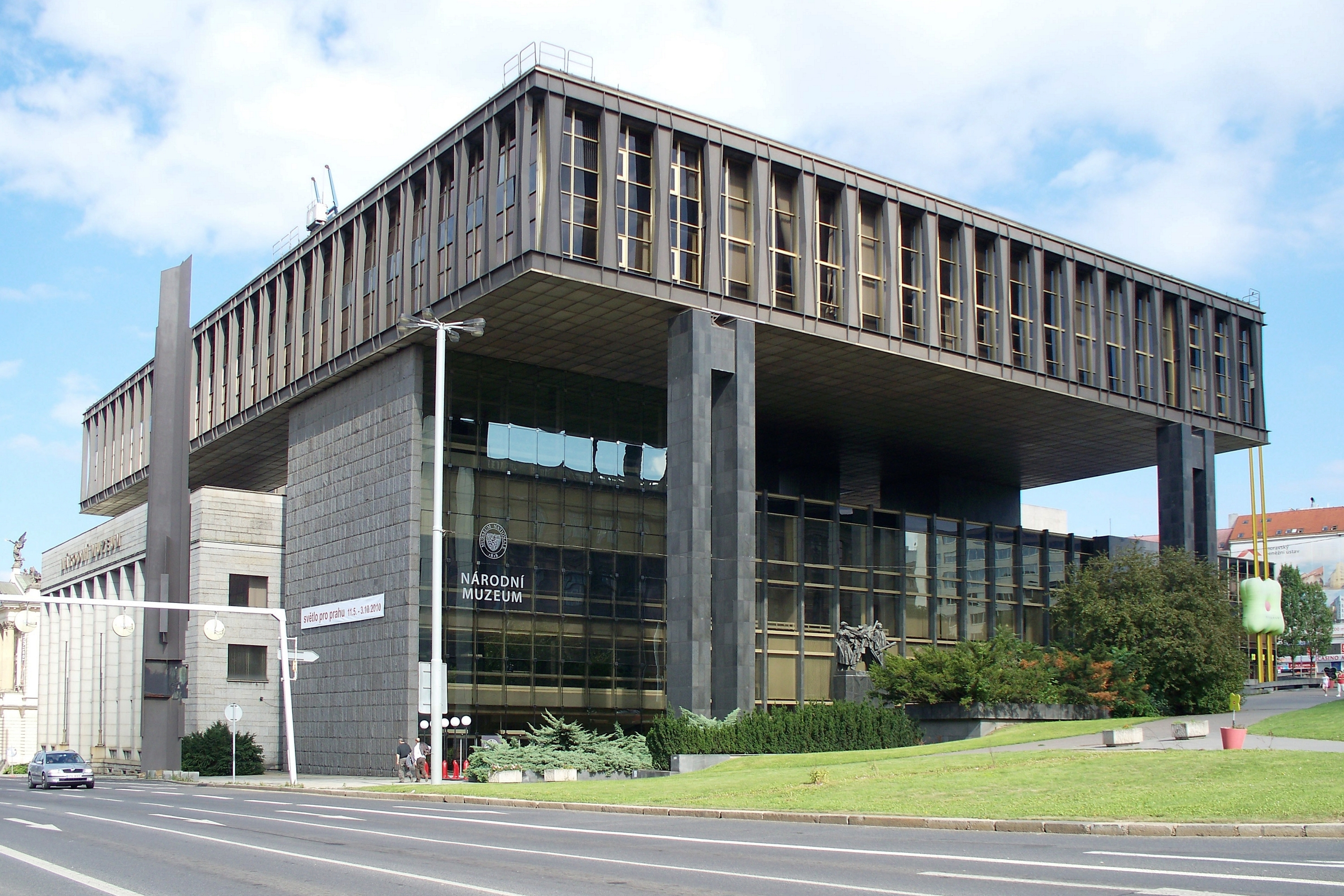
The New Building of the National Museum

The New Building of the National Museum (former Federální Shromáždění Building) is located next to the Main Building of the National Museum. The former Prague Stock Exchange was built in 1937. The building was extended in 1968–1973 for meetings of the Federal Assembly (parliament), the bridge girder was used there and at that time it was the largest hung glass wall in Czechoslovakia. Between 1995 and 2009 it was used by the Radio Free Europe/Radio Liberty.

In 2000, the Ministry of Culture declared the building a cultural monument. In 2009, the building was assigned to the National Museum for its permanent extension and is used for short-term exhibitions.

In 2019, the building was connected to the historical building through a tunnel. In 2021, the permanent exhibition History of the 20th Century was opened here.

=== Other buildings ===
In addition to the Historical and New Buildings, the National Museum also includes these buildings:

- Náprstek Museum (Betlémské náměstí, Praha)
- Czech Museum of Music (Karmelitská ulice, Praha)
- Bedřich Smetana Museum (Novotného lávka 1, Praha)
- Antonín Dvořák Museum (Ke Karlovu 20, Praha)
- Památník Jaroslava Ježka (Kaprova ulice, Praha)
- Památník Bedřicha Smetany (Jabkenice)
- Josef Suk Memorial (Křečovice)
- Lapidarium, Prague (Výstaviště, Praha 7 – Holešovice)
- Národopisné muzeum (Letohrádek Kinských Praha 5)
- National Monument at Vítkov (U Památníku 1990, Praha)
- Památník Františka Palackého a Františka Ladislava Riegra (Palackého ulice, Praha)
- Museum of Czech puppets and circuses (Prachatice)
- Vrchotovy Janovice Castle
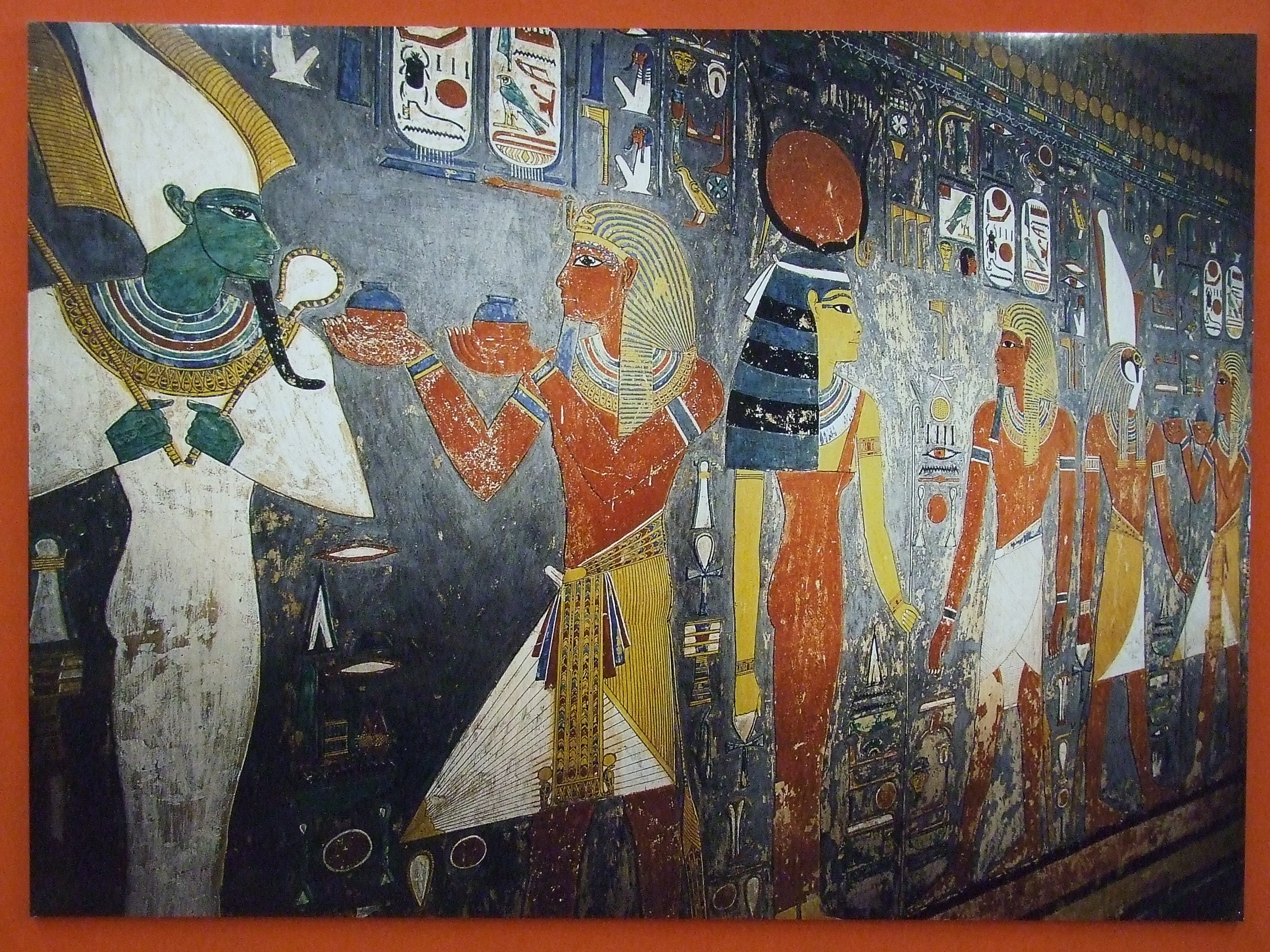
Egyptian exhibition in Náprstek Museum

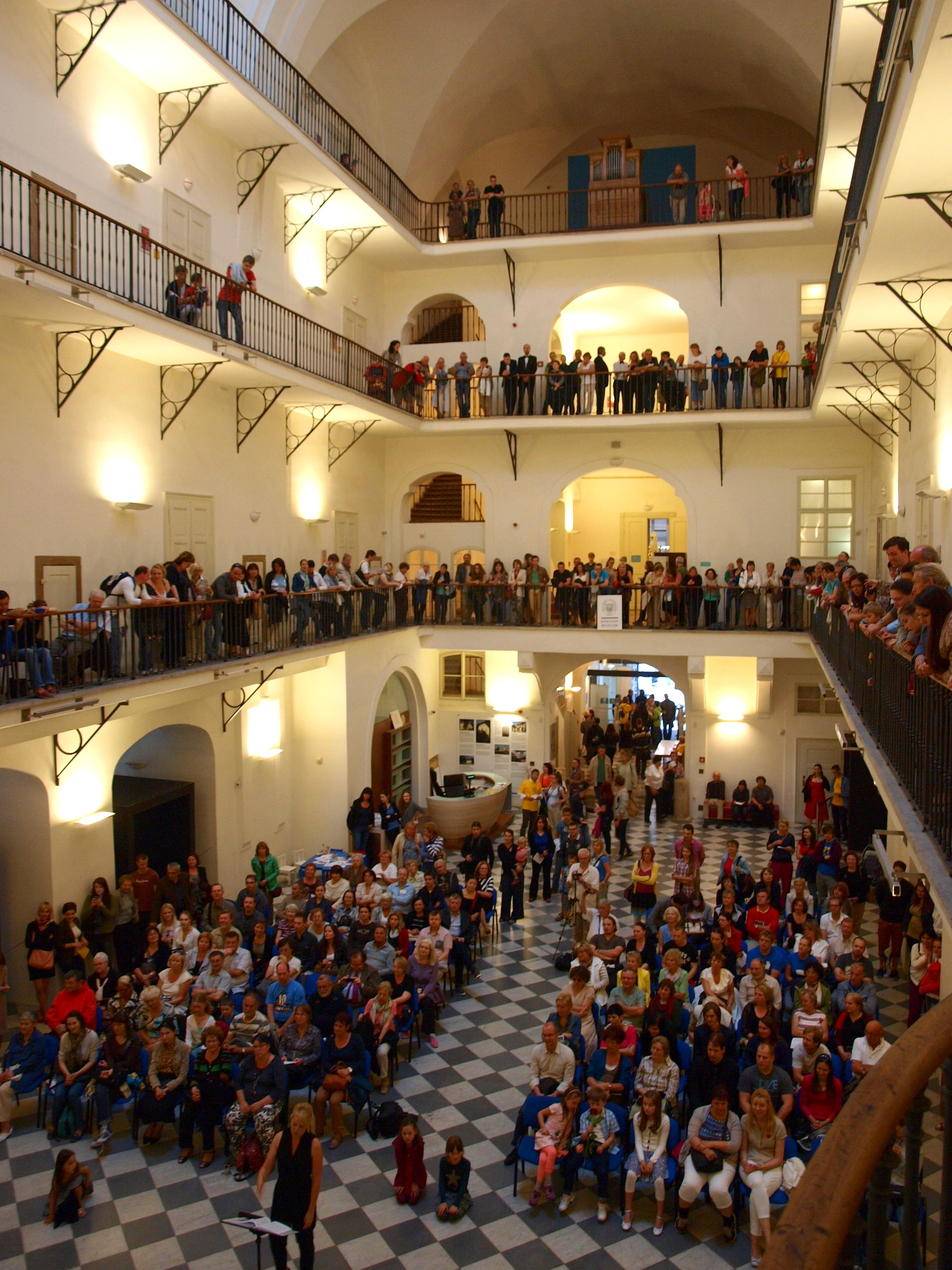
Czech Museum of Music

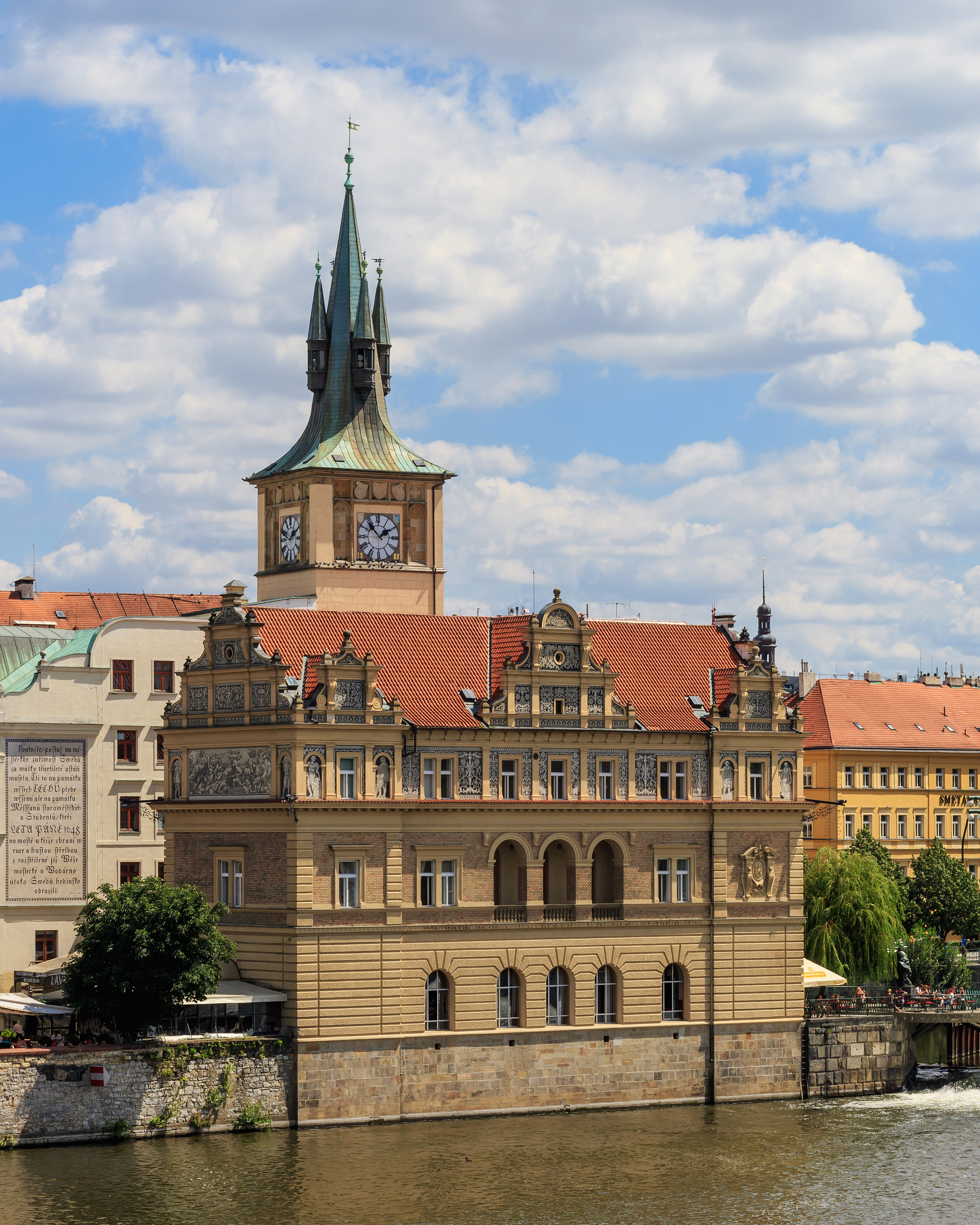
Bedřich Smetana Museum

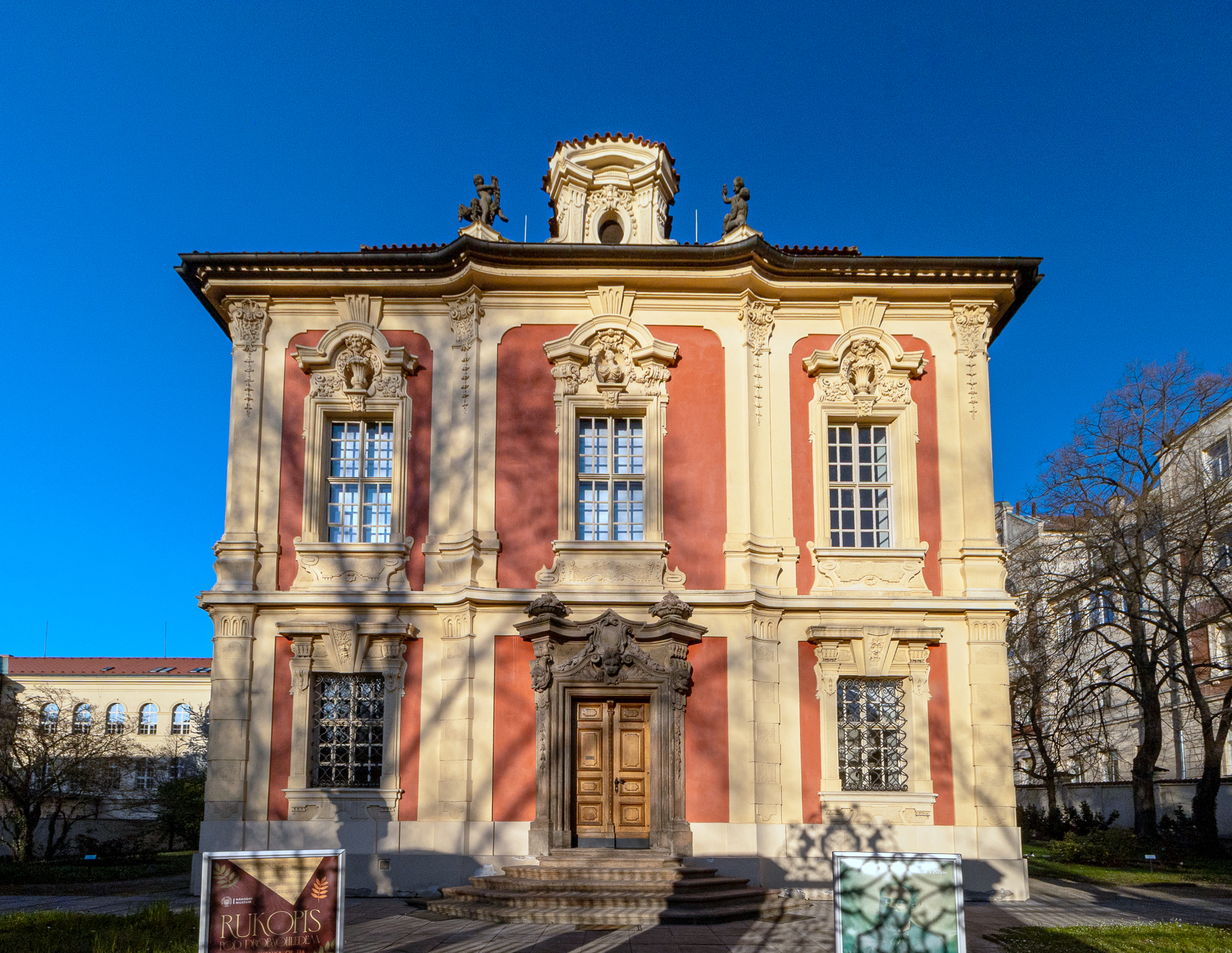
Antonín Dvořák Museum

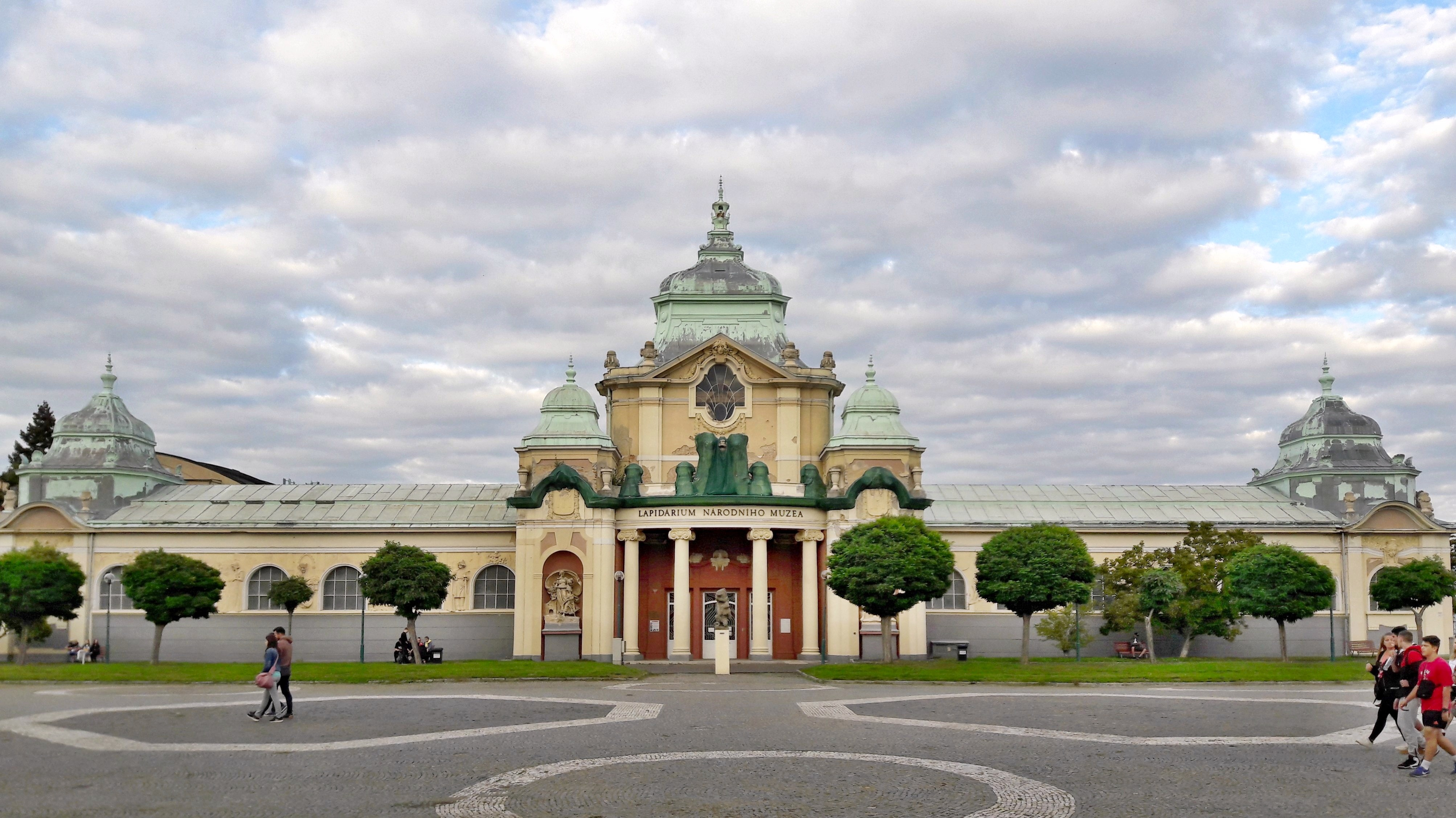
Lapidarium at Výstaviště

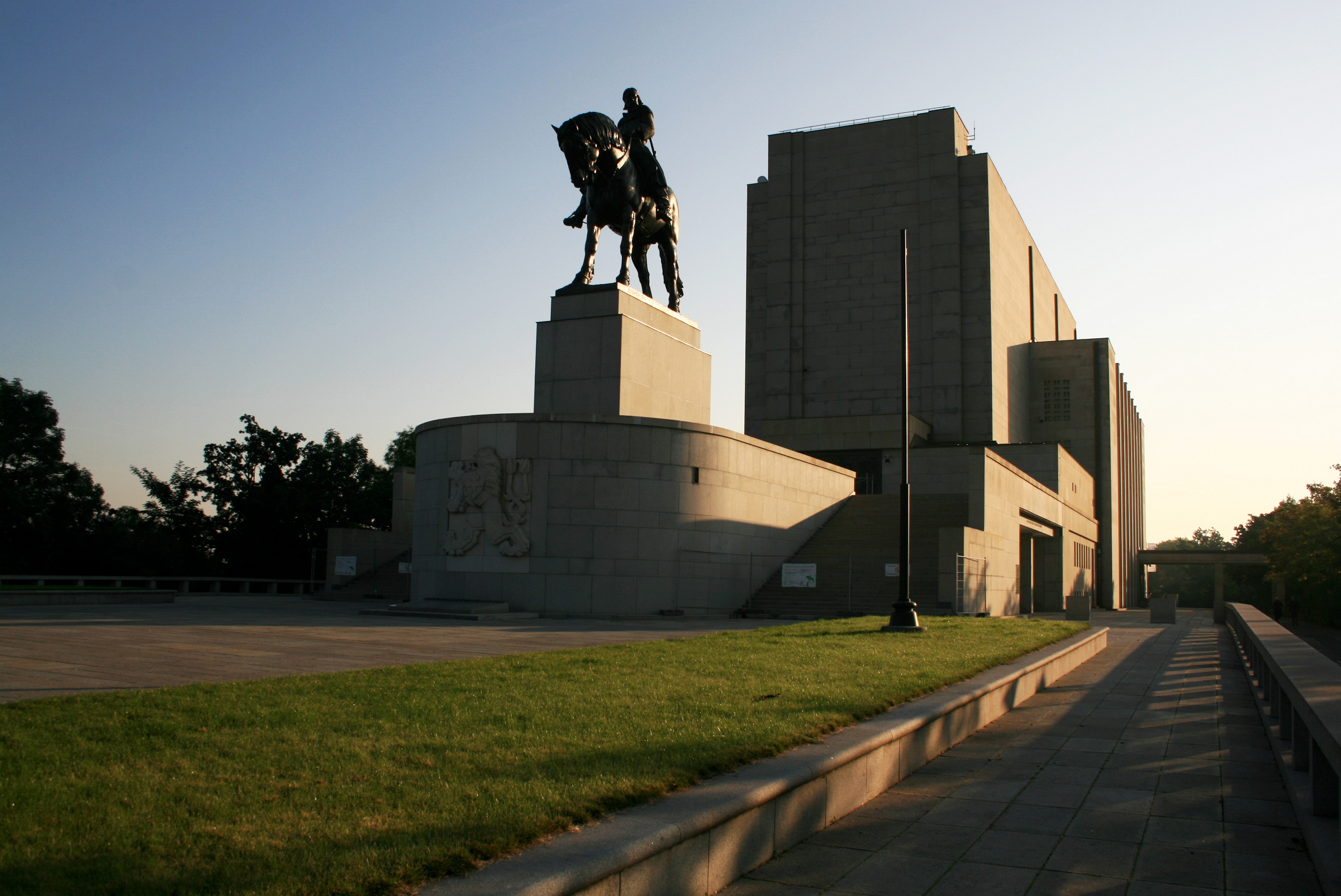
National Monument at Vítkov

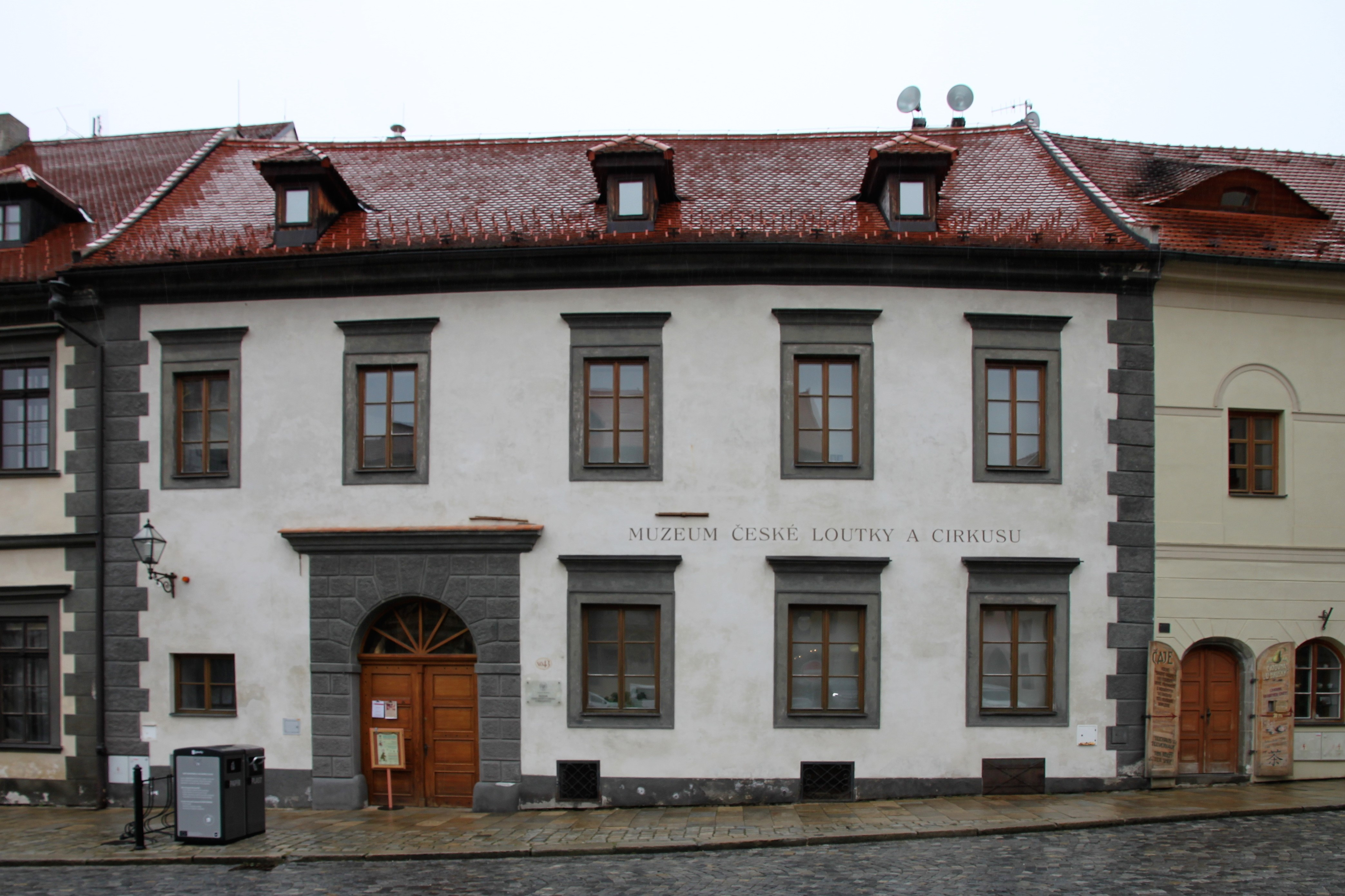
Museum of Czech puppets and circuses, Prachatice

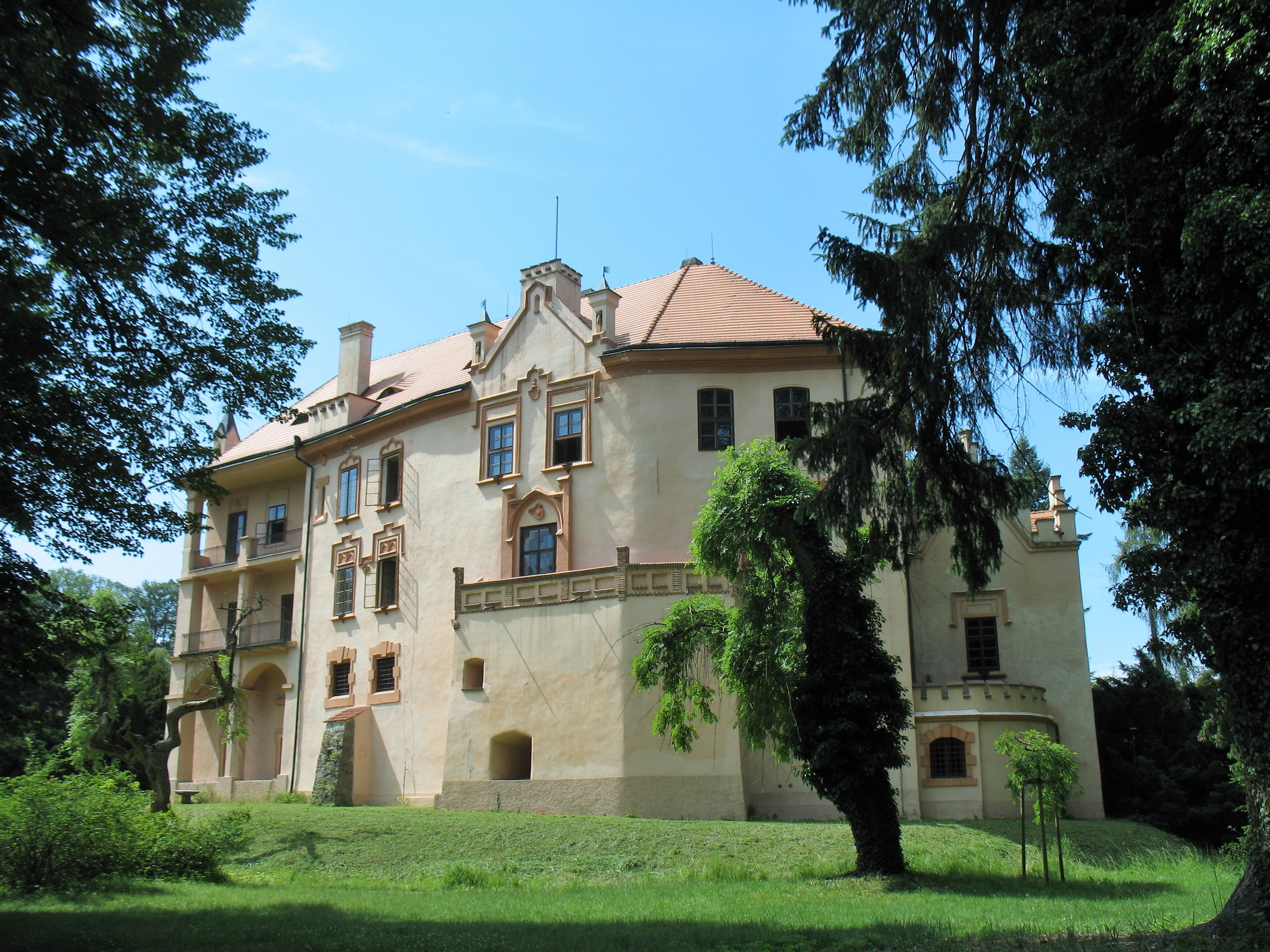
Vrchotovy Janovice Castle

== Collections and departments ==
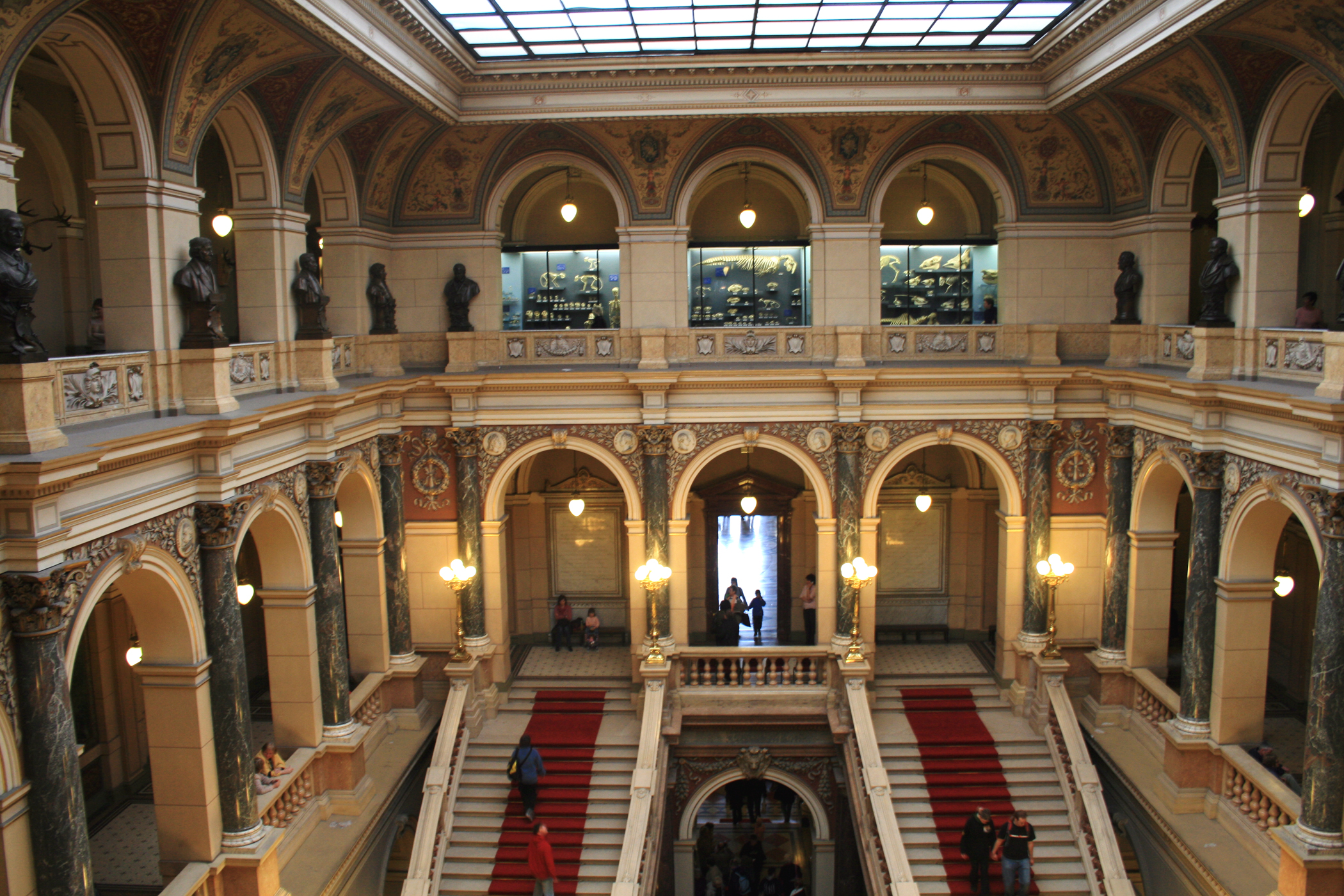
Main hall of the Czech National Museum

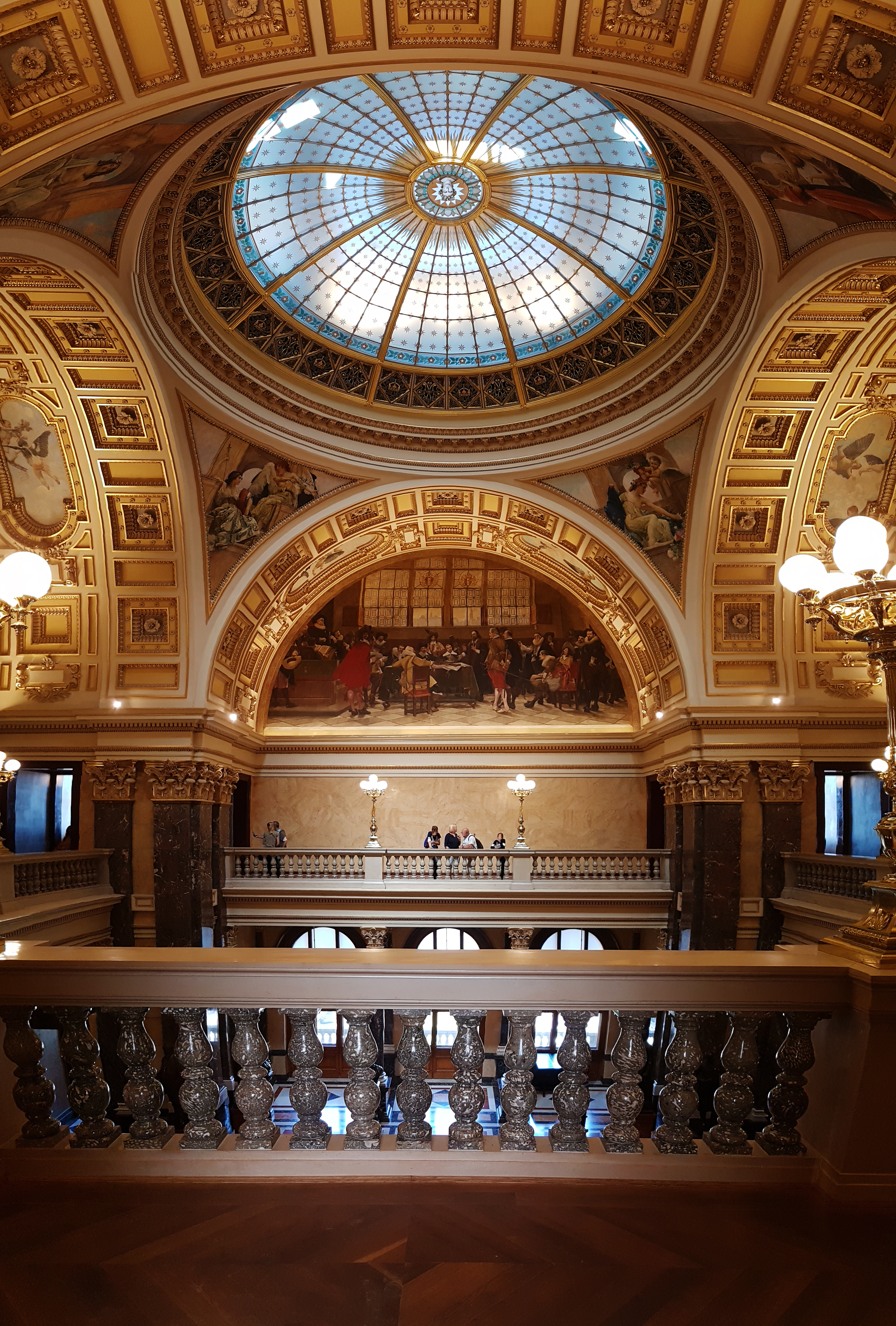
Dome hall

The National Museum currently contains several million items of material in three main parts: the Natural History Museum, the Historical Museum and the Library.

=== Natural History Museum ===
In 2010, the museum moved their collections to Prague 10, Horní Počernice. It has departments of mineralogy, paleontology, mycology, botany, entomology, zoology and anthropology, as well as scientific laboratories.

It is also the home of the Czech bird ringing scheme, and a member of the European Union for Bird Ringing (EURING).

=== The Historical Museum ===
==== Medieval collections ====
The medieval collection includes jewelry, panel painting, wooden sculpture, and weapons (also such as used in the Hussite movement of the 15th century). In addition to their historical value, many of the objects held by this department contain a high artistic value. Examples of precious objects include: a silver tiara of a duke from the twelfth century; Medieval, Renaissance and Baroque jewelry; liturgical objects from the Medieval period, which include several chalices, the reliquary of St Eligius in the shape of mitre; Gothic and Renaissance glazed tiles and paving stones; precious embroidery of Rosenberg antependium dated about 1370; and fine Bohemian porcelain and glass collection from before the 18th and 19th centuries, as well as collections of painted portraits and miniature painting.

==== Departments ====
- The Department of Prehistory and Protohistory contains a rich collection of artifacts which were used in daily life thousands of years ago. The curators of this collection were also among the first Czech archaeologists: J. L. Píč, curator of one of the collections from 1893 to 1911 is credited with conducting the first system archaeological field exploration in Czechoslovakia. The department also maintains collections in the field of classical archaeology; however, its main value is in the documentation of Greek and Roman arts and crafts. Among its most valuable objects are a painted dish of Nikosthenes, a glass bottle from the port of Puteolo, and a gilded silver rhyton. The Collection of Classical Archaeology belongs to the same department.
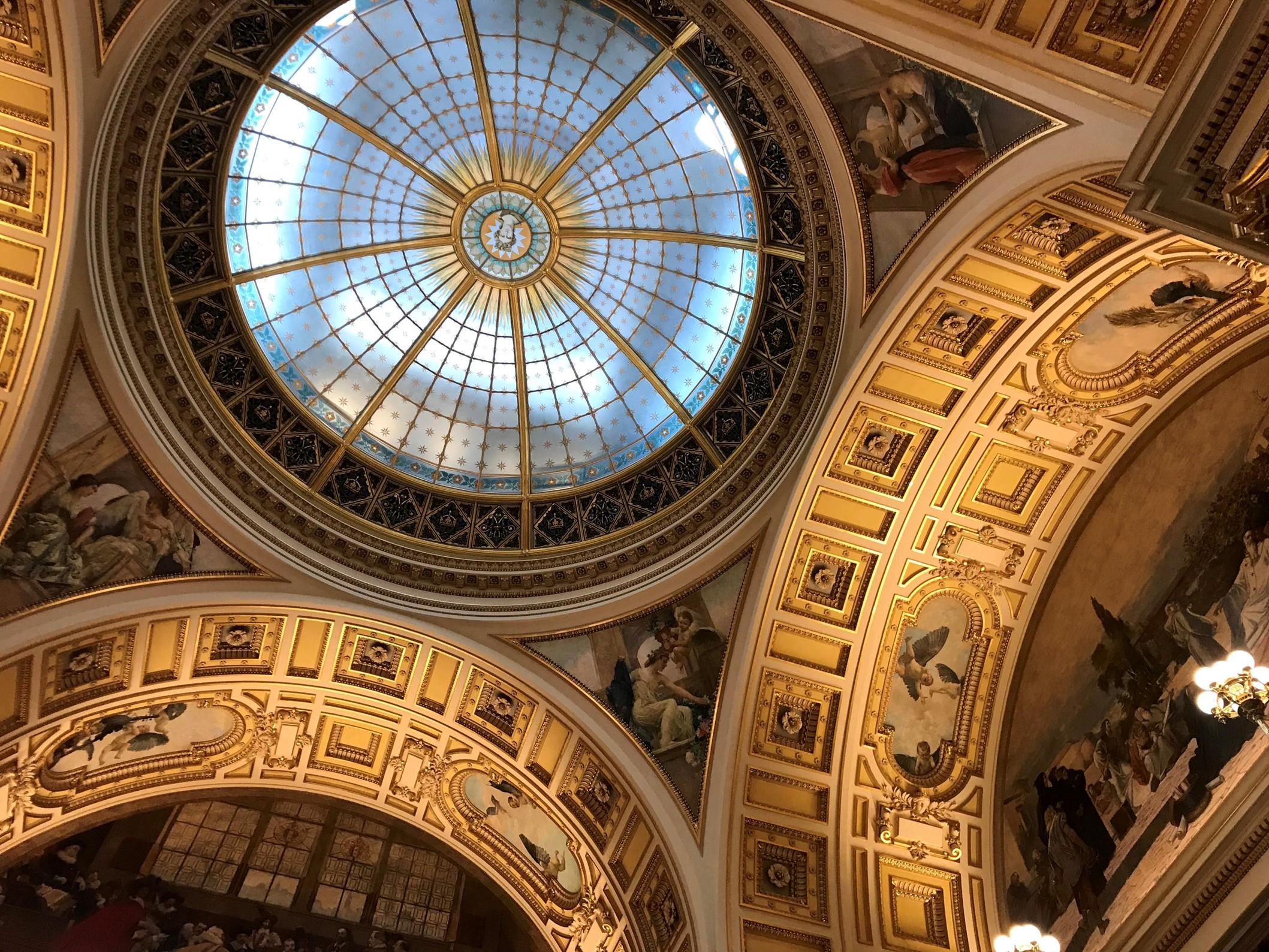
- Dome ceiling
  The Department of the Old Czech History has assembled numerous objects which trace the development of the Czech state beginning from the Slavonic culture of the 10th century up to the independent republic of Czechoslovakia in 1918. This is done through the acquisition of objects which recall figures of Czech culture and leadership. The collection of archaeology concerns many objects from archaeological excavation of the land (ceramics, metals, stone), artifacts of painting, sculpture and decorative arts beginning from the Roman period through Gothic, Renaissance and Baroque style up to the Romanticism of the 19th century.
- The Department of Ethnography – The stated aim of this department is to gather, in a systemic manner, factual material and data about the history and culture of the people of Czechoslovakia and the other nations of Europe, from the end of the 17th century to the present day. Much of the focus is placed on Slavic nations. The oldest ethnographic collections of the National Museum were inherited from the Jubilee Exhibition of 1891, with the result being that much of the focus has shifted to the past half-century, and the collections of the department are filled with simple wood and ceramic objects, which show the gradual shift from a rural society to one that has become increasingly urbanized.
- Department of Numismatics – Among the oldest departments in the Museum, it was founded through the gift of Count Sternberk. The goal of this department is to achieve a complete collection of legal tender coins used in past and present day Czechoslovakia. In addition, the department has a large number of foreign coin collections, the most valuable of these being a collection of coins of classical antiquity. Along with collecting coins, the department also maintains a large collection of medals. At present day, the National Museum contains approximately half a million objects. Emanuela Nohejlová-Prátová was department curator from 1930 to 1959.
- Department of Theater – Originally part of the National Museum Library, it was set up as a separate entity in 1930. Its first collections were primarily drawn from the archives of two theaters: the National Theater and the theater Vinohardy. In the following years, the collections were greatly expanded by the department's founder, Jan Bartos, and his successor, Joseph Knap. The department today contains extensive exhibits on the history of theater in Czechoslovakia, costume designs by prominent Czech artists, music, memorabilia, and items from the Czech puppet theater. The collections primarily contain stagecraft items from the middle of the 19th century to the present day, with efforts being made to enlarge the department's exhibits from the 18th century.

==== Archives ====
The archives contain rare charts and manuscripts of Czech history from the 11th to the 20th century; many of the ancient ones have been digitalized. The collection of personal legacy contains written sources of famous personalities of Czech history, and the collection of seals and seal-sticks include about 3,000 pieces.

== In popular culture ==
The museum has featured as Vatican City, in the 2004 film EuroTrip.

== See also ==
- Antonín Dvořák Museum
- List of museums in Prague
- Matice česká

== Bibliography ==
- Demetz, Peter. Prague in Black and Gold: Scenes from the Life of a European City.New York: Hill and Wang, 1997.
- Denkstein, Vladimir. "From National Museum." In Prague, Great Centers of Art, edited and with introduction by Vladimir Denkstein and Jiri Kotalik. Translated from Czech by Vladimir Varecha. Montclair, N.J.: Allanheld & Schram, 1979.
