= List of compositions by Josef Suk =

This is a list of compositions by Josef Suk.

Opus	Czech title (original title)	English title	Date	Genre	Scoring	Remarks
–	Polka G dur	Polka in G major	1882	Chamber music	for violin and piano	
–	Sonáta C dur	Sonata in C major	1883	Piano	for piano	
–	Ouvertura	Overture	1884–1885	Piano	for piano	
–	Polonaise C moll	Polonaise in C minor	1886–1887	Piano	for piano	
–	Jindřichohradecký cyklus • Příjezd do Hradce • Svatební pochod Milky se slečnou Krásovou • Vchod do rytířského sídla Milky • Vyplazené jazýčky	Jindřichův Hradec Cycle	1886–1887	Piano	for piano	
–	Skladba bez názvu B dur	Untitled Piece in B♭ major	1886–1887	Piano	for piano	
–	Skladba bez názvu G dur	Untitled Piece in G major	1886–1887	Piano	for piano	
–	Fantasie D moll	Fantasy in D minor	1888	Orchestral	for string orchestra	
–	Fuga C moll	Fugue in C minor	1888	Piano	for piano	
–	Smyčcový kvartet D moll	String Quartet in D minor	1888	Chamber music	for 2 violins, viola and cello	
–	Křečovická mše B dur	Křečovice Mass in B♭ major	1888–1889	Choral	for chorus, string orchestra and organ	revised 1932
2	Klavírní trio C moll	Piano Trio in C minor	1889	Chamber music	for violin, cello and piano	revised 1890–1891
–	Smuteční pochod C moll	Marche triste in C minor	1889	Orchestral	for string orchestra	
–	Balada D moll	Ballade in D minor	1890	Chamber music	for 2 violins, viola and cello	
–	Balada D moll	Ballade in D minor	1890	Chamber music	for violin and piano	
3	2 Skladby: 1. Balada D moll 2. Serenáda A dur	2 Pieces: 1. Ballade in D minor 2. Serenade in A major	1890	Chamber music	for cello and piano	revised 1898
–	Fantazie D moll	Fantasy in D minor	1890	Chamber music	for 2 violins, viola and cello (and piano ad libitum)	
–	Fuga C moll	Fugue in C minor	1890	Chamber music	for 2 violins, viola and cello	also for piano
–	Fuga C moll	Fugue in C minor	1890	Piano	for piano	also for string quartet
–	Hory, doly, samý květ		1890	Vocal	for voice and piano	
1	Klavírní kvartet A moll	Piano Quartet in A minor	1891	Chamber music	for violin, viola, cello and piano	
–	Noc byla krásná	The Night Was Beautiful	1891	Vocal	for voice and piano	
–	3 Písně beze slov: 1. Lístek do památníku 2. Snění; 3. Melodie	3 Songs without Words: 1. Album Leaf; 2. Dreaming; 3. Melody	1891	Piano	for piano	
–	Ukolébavka	Lullaby	1891	Vocal	for child's voice and piano	
4	Dramatická ouvertura A moll	Dramatic Overture in A minor	1891–1892	Orchestral	for orchestra	
–	Ach, wärst du mein	Oh, would you be mine?	1892	Vocal	for voice and piano	
5	Fantazie-polonéza C dur	Fantasy-Polonaise in C major	1892	Piano	for piano	
6	Serenáda pro smyčcové nástroje Es dur	Serenade for Strings in E♭ major	1892	Orchestral	for string orchestra	
7	6 Klavírních skladeb: 1. Píseň lásky 2. Humoreska; 3. Vzpomínky; 4. Dvě idylky 5. Dumka; 6. Capriccietto	6 Piano Pieces: 1. Song of Love in D♭ major 2. Humoresque in G minor/B♭ major 3. Souvenir in C minor 4. 2 Little Idylls in F major and F minor 5. Dumka in D major 6. Capriccietto in A minor	1891–1893	Piano	for piano	
–	Capriccietto G dur	Capriccietto in G major	1893	Piano	for piano	
8	Klavírní kvintet G moll	Piano Quintet in G minor	1893	Chamber music	for 2 violins, viola, cello and piano	revised 1915
–	Melodie	Melody	1893	Chamber music	for 2 violins	
–	Humoreska C dur	Humoresque in C major	1894	Piano	for piano	
9	Pohádka zimního večera, Předehra	Tale of a Winter's Eve	1894	Orchestral	for orchestra	Overture after Shakespeare's The Winter's Tale; revised 1926
10	5 Nálad: 1. Legenda; 2. Capriccio; 3. Romance; 4. Bagatela; 5. Jarní idyla	5 Moods: 1. Legend in D♭ major 2. Capriccio in E♭ minor 3. Romance in B major 4. Bagatelle in A major 5. Spring Idyll in E♭ major	1895	Piano	for piano	
–	Lístek do památníku F dur	Album Leaf in F major	1895	Piano	for piano	
–	Nechte cizí, mluvte vlastní řečí	Leave strangers, speak your own language	1896	Choral	for male chorus	
11	Smyčcový kvartet č. 1 B dur	String Quartet No. 1 in B♭ major	1896	Chamber music	for 2 violins, viola and cello	
12	8 Klavírních skladeb: 1. D moll 2. F dur 3. Des dur 4. Gis moll 5. As dur 6. A moll 7. Es dur 8. D moll	8 Piano Pieces: 1. D minor 2. F major 3. D♭ major 4. G♯ minor 5. A♭ major 6. A minor 7. E♭ major 8. D minor	1895–1896	Piano	for piano	
–	Sonatina G moll	Sonatina in G minor	1897	Piano	for piano	revised as Op. 21; Andante included in 4 Episodes
–	Vesnická serenáda F dur	Village Serenade in F major	1897	Piano	for piano	
–	Bagatela G dur	Bagatelle in G major	1898	Piano	for piano	arrangement of the original 3rd movement of Symphonie, Op. 14
13	Radúz a Mahulena	Radúz and Mahulena	1897–1898	Orchestral	for alto, tenor, narrators, chorus and orchestra	Music for Julius Zeyer's Fairy-Tale Play; revised 1912
14	Symfonie E dur	Symphony in E major	1897–1899	Orchestral	for orchestra	
15	10 Zpěvů: 1. Žal; 2. Tužba; 3. Společný hrob 4. Pastýři na jaro 5. Divná voda 6. Víly; 7. Pastýř a pastýřka 8. Zpomínky; 9. Choutka po vdaní 10. Kéž by věděli	10 Songs	1899	Choral	for female chorus and piano 4-hands	
16	Pohádka: 1. O věrném milování Radúze a Mahuleny a jejich strastech 2. Intermezzo – Hra na labutě a pávy 3. Intermezzo – Smuteční hudba 4. Runy kletba a jak byla láskou zrušena	Fairy Tale: 1. The Constant Love of Radúz and Mahulena and Their Trials; 2. Intermezzo – Playing at Swans and Peacocks; 3. Intermezzo – Funeral Music; 4. Runa's Curse and How It Was Broken by True Love	1899–1900	Orchestral	for orchestra	Suite from Julius Zeyer's Fairy-Tale Play Radúz a Mahulena
17	4 Skladby: 1. Quasi ballata 2. Appassionato; 3. Un poco triste 4. Burleska	4 Pieces: 1. Quasi ballata 2. Appassionato; 3. Un poco triste 4. Burlesque	1900	Chamber music	for violin and piano	
18	4 Zpěvy: 1. Bán varaždinský a král Matyáš; 2. Raněný; 3. Klid se tratí 4. Chuďas	4 Songs	1900	Choral	for male chorus	
19	3 Zpěvy: 1. Zavedený ovčák 2. Mať moja 3. Stasa čarodějnice	3 Songs	1900	Choral	for chorus and piano ad libitum	
20	Pod jabloní • Bacchanale • Píseň Danici • Sbory blažených • Zpěvy andělů • Živanova touha	Beneath the Apple Tree	1900–1901	Choral	for alto, narrators, chorus and orchestra	revised 1911, 1915
21	Suita: 1. Adagio – Allegro vivace 2. Minuetto; 3. Dumka; 4. Allegro ma non troppo	Suite: 1. Adagio – Allegro vivace in G minor 2. Minuetto in G major 3. Dumka in E♭ major 4. Allegro ma non troppo in G minor	1900	Piano	for piano	
22a	Jaro: 1. Jaro; 2. Vánek; 3. V očekávání 4. Andante; 5. V roztoužení	Spring: 1. Spring in E major 2. The Breeze in C major 3. In Expectation in G♭ major 4. Andante in A minor 5. Lovesickness in D♭ major	1902	Piano	for piano	
22b	Letní dojmy: 1. V poledne 2. Hra dětí 3. Večerní nálada	Summer Impressions: 1. At Midday in B major 2. Child's Play in G major 3. Evening Mood in G♭ major	1902	Piano	for piano	
23	Elegie „pod dojmem Zeyerova Vyšehradu“	Elegy "Under the Impression of Julius Zeyer's Vyšehrad"	1902	Chamber music	for violin solo, cello solo, string quartet, harmonium and harp	also in a shortened version for violin, cello and piano
–	Mé ženě!	To My Wife	1902	Vocal	for voice and piano	
24	Fantazie G moll	Fantasy in G minor	1902–1903	Concertante	for violin and orchestra	
25	Fantastické scherzo G moll	Fantastic Scherzo in G minor	1902–1903	Orchestral	for orchestra	
26	Praga	Praga	1904	Orchestral	for orchestra	Symphonic Poem
27	„Asrael“ Symfonie C moll	Asrael Symphony in C minor	1905–1906	Orchestral	for orchestra	
–	Hospodin jest můj pastýř	The Lord Is My Shepherd	1907	Choral		
28	O matince: 1. Když byla matinka ještě děvčátkem 2. Kdysi z jara 3. Jak zpívala matinka za noci chorému děcku 4. O matinčině srdci 5. Vzpomínání	About Mother: 1. When Mother Was Still a Little Girl in B♭ major 2. Once in Springtime in F♯ major 3. How Mother Sang at Night to a Sick Child in B♭ minor 4. Mother's Heart in D♭ major 5. Remembering in C major	1907	Piano	for piano	5 Pieces
29	Pohádka léta: 1. Hlasy života a útěchy 2. V poledne 3. Intermezzo – Slepí hudci 4. V moci přeludů 5. Noc	A Summer's Tale: 1. Voices of Life and Consolation; 2. Midday; 3. Intermezzo – The Blind Musicians; 4. Chimera-Bound; 5. Night	1908–1909	Orchestral	for orchestra	Symphonic Poem
–	Psina španělská	Spanish Caprice	1909	Piano	for piano	
30	Životem a snem: 1. S humorem a ironií, místy rozdurděně 2. Neklidně a nesměle, bez silnějšího výrazu 3. Tajemně a velmi vzdušně 4. Zamyšleně, později stále výbojněji 5. K uzdravení mého syna – Klidně, s hlubokým citem 6. S výrazem tiché, bezstarostné veselosti 7. Jednoduše – Později s výrazem drtivé moci 8. Jemně, švitorně 9. Šepotavě a tajemně 10. Zapomenutým rovům v koutku hřbitova Křečovického – Snivě	Things Lived and Dreamed: 1. With Wit and Irony, Fuming in Places in G major 2. Restlessly and Shyly, without Strong Emotion in A♭ major 3. Mysteriously and Very Light in F major 4. Contemplatively, Then Increasingly Aggressive in D♭ major 5. On the Recovery of My Son – Calmly, with Deep Emotion in C major 6. With Expression of Quiet, Carefree Good Humor in B♭ major 7. Simply – Later with Expression of Oppressive Power in F♯ minor 8. Gently, Chirpingly in E♭ major 9. Whisperingly and Mysteriously in B minor 10. To the Forgotten Graves in the Corner of the Křečovice Churchyard – Dreamily in F♯ minor	1909	Piano	for piano	10 Pieces; a.k.a. Life and Dreams
31	Smyčcový kvartet č. 2	String Quartet No. 2	1911	Chamber music	for 2 violins, viola and cello	
–	Tempo di Minuetto G dur	Tempo di Minuetto in G major		Chamber music	for 2 violins, viola and cello	rewriting of Minuet from Sonatina for piano
32	Mužské sbory: 1. Zoťatá breza 2. Pěšinka; 3. Ukolébavka; 4. a. V krásném lese b. Za hory se slunce chýlí c. Svítí hvězdy d. Strmí hruška 5. Nebezpečná cesta	Male Choruses: 1. Lullaby; 2. a. b. c. d.	1911–1912	Choral	for male chorus	
33	Ukolébavky: 1. Nad spícími děcky 2. Popěvek; 3. Sentimentální sebeparodie na pouliční písničku 4. K uzdravení 5. Vánoční sen dítěte 6. Smrti, přijď jen tiše!	Lullabies: 1. Sleeping Children in F major 2. Ditty in G major 3. Sentimental Self-Parody on a Popular Song in A♭ major 4. Return to Health in A♭ major 5. A Child's Christmas Dream in E minor 6. Death, Come But Softly! in C major	1910–1912	Piano	for piano	
34	Zrání	Ripening	1912–1917	Orchestral	for orchestra	Symphonic Poem
–	Cyklus symfonických básní z českých dějin • Blaník • Česká žena a český muž – Libuše a Přemysl • Jan Ámos Komenský • Jan Hus • Příchod Čechův na Říp	Cycle of Symphonic Poems from Czech History • Blaník • Přemysl and Libuše – Czech Husband and Wife • Jan Ámos Komenský • Jan Hus • Arrival of the Czechs on Říp	1915–1917	Orchestral	for orchestra	
35a	Meditace na staročeský chorál „Svatý Václave“	Meditation on the Old Czech Chorale "St. Wenceslas"	1914	Orchestral	for string orchestra	also for string quartet
35a	Meditace na staročeský chorál „Svatý Václave“	Meditation on the Old Czech Chorale "St. Wenceslas"	1914	Chamber music	for 2 violins, viola and cello	also for string orchestra
–	Smyčcová věta B dur	Quartet Movement "Allegro giocoso" in B♭ major	1915	Chamber music	for 2 violins, viola and cello	revision of the finale of String Quartet No. 1
–	Bagatela „S kyticí v ruce“	Bagatelle "With Nosegay in Hand"	1917	Chamber music	for flute, violin and piano	
–	Minuet	Minuet	1919?	Chamber music	for violin and piano	
35b	Legenda o mrtvých vítězích, Pamětní skladba	Legend of the Dead Victors	1919–1920	Orchestral	for orchestra	Commemoration Piece
35c	V nový život, Slavnostní pochod Sokolský C dur	Towards a New Life in C major	1919–1920	Orchestral	for orchestra	Festive Sokol March
36	O přátelství Ges dur	Friendship in G♭ major	1920	Piano	for piano	a.k.a. About Friendship
37	Epilog	Epilogue	1920–1929	Orchestral	for soprano, baritone, bass, chorus and orchestra	revised 1929–1933
–	Barkarola – Andante con moto B dur	Barcarolle – Andante con moto in B♭ major	1923	Chamber music	for 2 violins, viola and cello	revision of the 2nd movement of String Quartet (1888)
–	O štědrém dni	Christmas Day	1924	Vocal	for 2 voices and violin	
–	4 Episody: 1. Andante; 2. Ella Polka; 3. Lístek do památníku 4. O štědrém dni	4 Episodes: 1. Andante; 2. Ella Polka; 3. Album Leaf; 4. Christmas Day in G major	1897; 1909; 1919/1920; 1923	Piano	for piano	1. Andante movement from Sonatina, Op. 13
–	Pod Blaníkem, Pochod	Beneath Blaník	1932	Orchestral	for orchestra	March
–	Sousedská	Sousedská	1935	Chamber music	for 5 violins, double bass, cymbals, triangle, side drum and bass drum	
–	Sousedská	Sousedská	1935	Piano	for piano	
