= Concert at the End of Summer =

- Movie poster
- Directed by: František Vláčil
- Written by: Zdeněk Mahler
- Produced by: Oldřich Mach
- Starring: Josef Vinklář
- Cinematography: Jiří Macák
- Edited by: Miroslav Hájek
- Music by: Jarmil Burghauser
- Production company: Barrandov Studios
- Distributed by: Ústřední půjčovna filmů
- Release date: 1 February 1980
- Running time: 102 minutes
- Country: Czechoslovakia
- Language: Czech

Concert at the End of Summer (Czech: Koncert na konci léta) is a 1980 Czechoslovak historical biographical film. The film consists of scenes from the life of Antonín Dvořák.

== Plot ==
Antonín Dvořák prepares for Concert at Royal Albert Hall but bad feeling forces him to return to his homeland. While in a train, Dvořák remembers his life. He remembers when he started 15 years ago as a violinist in a Theatre. He was impressed by young actress Josefína Čermáková but she married count Kounic while Dvořák married her sister Anna. Dvořák the got into conflict with Kounic's brother Kent which almost cost him career. But support from his wife Anna and help from influential composer Brahms helps him succeed. His conflict with Kent continues as Kent orders a composition from him that he would release as his own but Dvořák manages to get rid of the contract. Dvořák returns to Prague where he is greeted by his family.

== Cast ==
- Josef Vinklář as Antonín Dvořák
- Jana Hlaváčková as Anna Dvořáková
- Jana Hlaváčová as Josefina Čermáková
- Svatopluk Beneš as Count Kounic
- František Němec as Kent
- Vlasta Fabianová as Countess Eleonora
- Jiří Bartoška as Kent's Messenger
- Zlata Adamovská as Otylka
- Ondřej Pavelka as Josef Suk
- Václav Lohniský as Band Master
- Ondřej Havelka as Student called Fénix
- Ladislav Bambas as Oskar Nedbal

== Reception ==
=== Accolades ===
Date of ceremony	Event	Award	Result	Ref(s)
1982	Satander Exposition of Musical and Choreographic Films	Kantabrian Zuber	Won	
