= Serenade =

Musical composition or performance

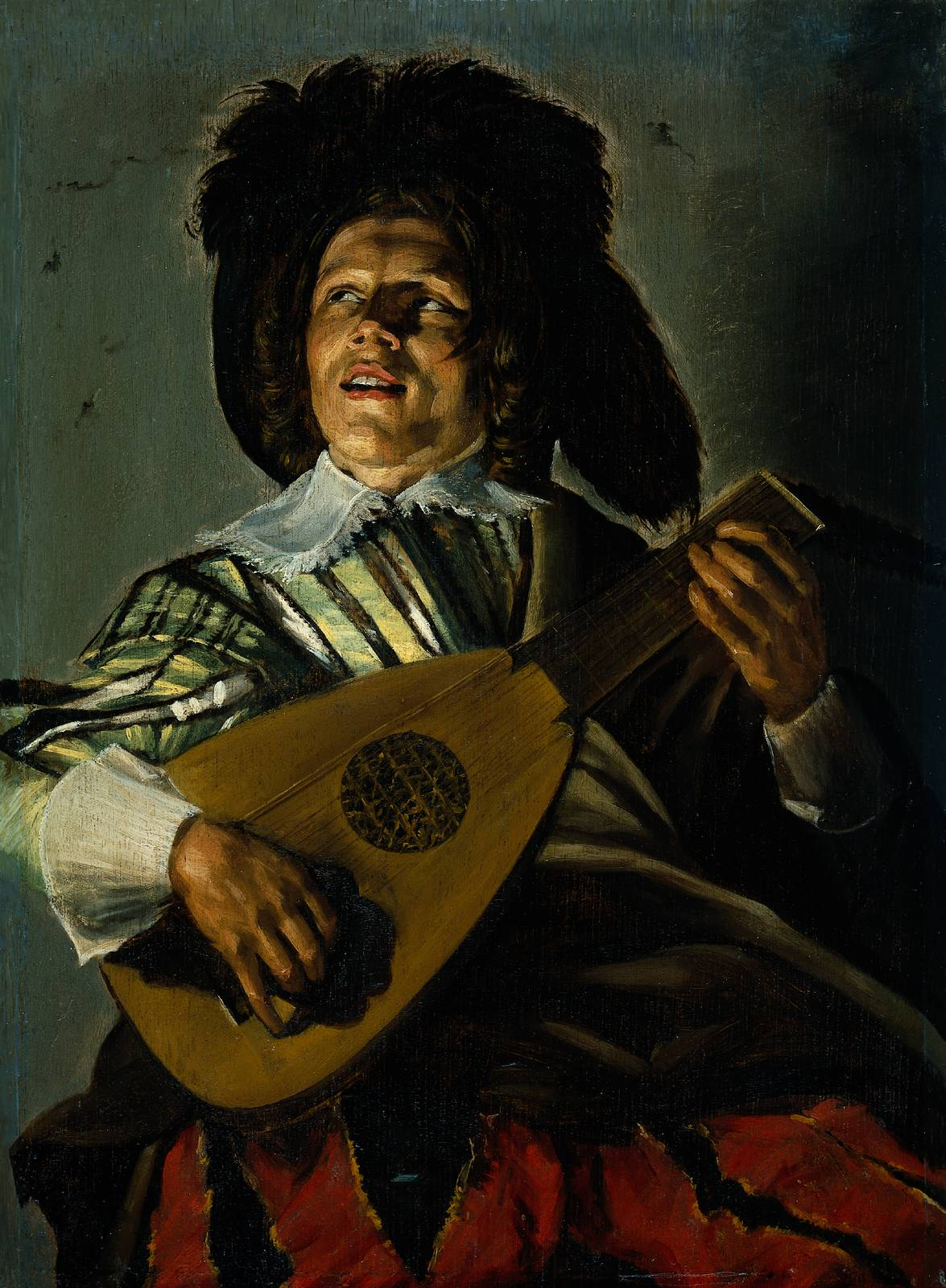
Serenade by Judith Leyster

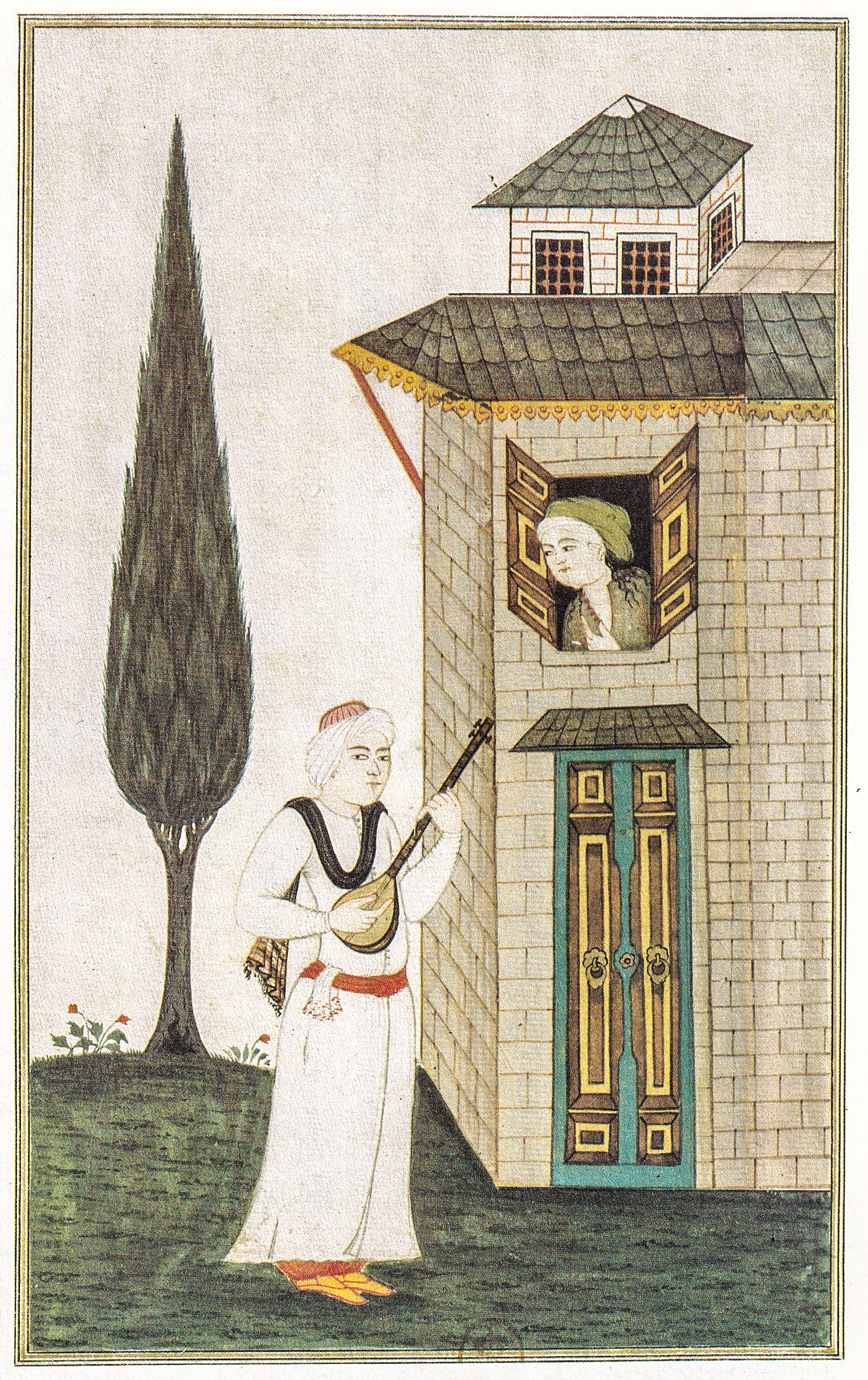
Serenade in the Ottoman empire, 1688

In music, a serenade (/ˌsɛrəˈneɪd/; also sometimes called a serenata, from the Italian) is a musical composition or performance delivered in honour of someone or something. Serenades are typically calm, light pieces of music. The term comes from the Italian word serenata, which itself derives from the Latin serenus. The sense was influenced by Italian sera "evening", from Latin sera, fem. of serus "late".

== Early serenade music ==
In the oldest usage, which survives in informal form to the present day, a serenade is a musical greeting performed for a lover, friend, person of rank or other person to be honored. The classic usage would be from a lover to his lady love through a window. It was considered an evening piece, one to be performed on a quiet and pleasant evening, as opposed to an aubade, which would be performed in the morning. The custom of serenading in this manner began in the Medieval era, and the word "serenade" as commonly used in current English is related to this custom. Music performed followed no one particular form, except that it was typically sung by one person accompanying himself on a portable instrument, most likely a guitar, lute or other plucked instrument. Works of this type also appeared in later eras, but usually in a context that referred specifically to a past time, such as arias in an opera (there is a famous example in Mozart's Don Giovanni). Carl Maria von Weber composed his serenade for voice and guitar, "Horch'! Leise horch', Geliebte!" (1809).

== Baroque era ==
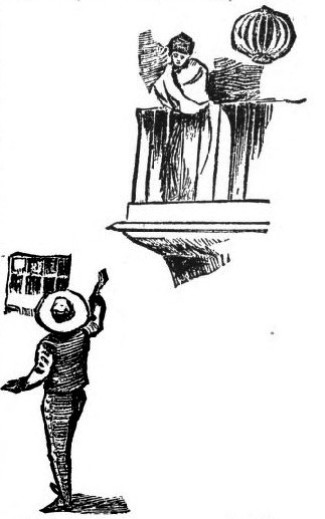
A young woman being serenaded by a man in the street below

In the Baroque era, a serenata—as the form was called since it occurred most frequently in Italy and Vienna—was a typically celebratory or eulogistic dramatic cantata for two or more singers and orchestra, performed outdoors in the evening by artificial light. Some composers of this type of serenade include Alessandro Stradella, Alessandro Scarlatti, Johann Joseph Fux, Johann Mattheson, and Antonio Caldara. Often these were large-scale works performed with minimal staging, intermediate between a cantata and an opera. The main difference between a cantata and a serenata, around 1700, was that the serenata was performed outdoors and therefore could use instruments which would be too loud in a small room (for example, trumpets, horns, and drums).

== Classical and Romantic eras ==
The most important and prevalent type of serenade in music history is a work for large instrumental ensemble in multiple movements, related to the divertimento, and mainly being composed in the Classical and Romantic periods, though a few examples exist from the 20th century. Usually the character of the work is lighter than other multiple-movement works for large ensemble (for example the symphony), with tunefulness being more important than thematic development or dramatic intensity. Most of these works are from Italy, Germany, Austria and Bohemia.

Among the most famous examples of the serenade from the 18th century are those by Mozart, whose serenades typically comprise between four and ten movements. His serenades were often purely instrumental pieces, written for special occasions such as those commissioned for wedding ceremonies. Famous serenades by Mozart include the Haffner Serenade, Serenade No. 10 for winds commonly known as Gran Partita, the Serenata notturna, and one of his most famous works, Eine Kleine Nachtmusik. The last two of these, had they been written earlier in the century, would have been atypical for using only string instruments.

By the 19th century, the serenade had transformed into a concert work, and was less associated with outdoor performance for honorary occasions. Composers began to write serenades for other ensembles. The two serenades by Brahms are rather like light symphonies, perhaps more closely related to suites, except that they use an ensemble such as Mozart would have recognized: a small orchestra (in the case of the Serenade No. 2, an orchestra entirely without violins). Dvořák, Tchaikovsky, Josef Suk, Edward Elgar, and others wrote serenades for strings only, see Serenade for Strings (Dvořák), Serenade for Strings (Tchaikovsky), Serenade for Strings (Suk), and Serenade for Strings (Elgar), as did Hugo Wolf, who wrote one for string quartet (the Italian Serenade). Other composers to write serenades in a Romantic style include Ludwig van Beethoven, Franz Schubert, Richard Strauss, Max Reger, Ethel Smyth, Wilhelm Stenhammar and Jean Sibelius (see Two Serenades (Sibelius)).

== 20th century ==
Some examples of serenades in the 20th century include the Serenade for Tenor, Horn and Strings by Benjamin Britten, the Serenade in A for piano by Stravinsky, the Serenade for baritone and septet, Op. 24 by Arnold Schoenberg, and the movement entitled "Serenade" in Shostakovich's last string quartet, No. 15 (1974). Ralph Vaughan Williams wrote a Serenade to Music (for 16 solo voices and orchestra) that premiered in 1938, while Leonard Bernstein composed his Serenade after Plato's "Symposium" (for solo violin, strings harp and percussion) in 1954. These modern serenades are freely explored adaptations to the serenade's original formal layout and instrumentation.

A serenade is commonly of a multi-movement structure, ranging anywhere from four to up to ten movements. They usually are constructed with a fast opening movement, followed by middle slow movements that alternate with fast ones and close with a fast presto or allegro movement. There are strong influences from chamber music, and serenades can be subtly inserted into a chamber music program. A serenade can be considered somewhere in between a suite and a symphony, but is usually of a light and romantic nature — casual and without too many overly dramatic moments.

== See also ==
- Harana (serenade)
- Cassation (music)
- Nocturne
