= Otilie Suková =

Czech pianist and composer (1878–1905)

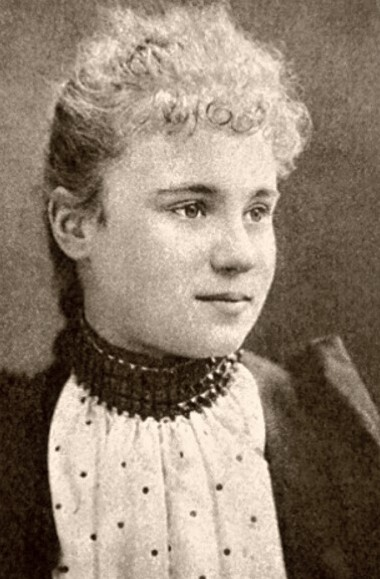
Suková in c. 1900

Otilie Suková, also known as Otilie Suková-Dvořáková (née Otilie Dvořáková; 6 June 1878 – 5 July 1905), was a Czech pianist and composer. She was the daughter of composer Antonín Dvořák and the wife of violinist and Dvořák's pupil Josef Suk the Elder.

== Life ==
=== Youth ===
Otilie Dvořáková was born on 6 June 1878 in New Town quarter of Prague, into the Dvořák family: Antonín Dvořák and his wife Anna Dvořáková, a musician and Dvořák's former pupil. She had siblings Otakar and Magdalena, a talented opera singer. Already in her childhood, she was an excellent pianist with her father's support, and she graduated from a girls' high school in Prague. She also attended his family's stays in the United States and England from 1892 to 1894, growing up in an exceptionally rich cultural and artistic environment of her time. She also composed several short piano pieces.

=== Marriage to Josef Suk ===
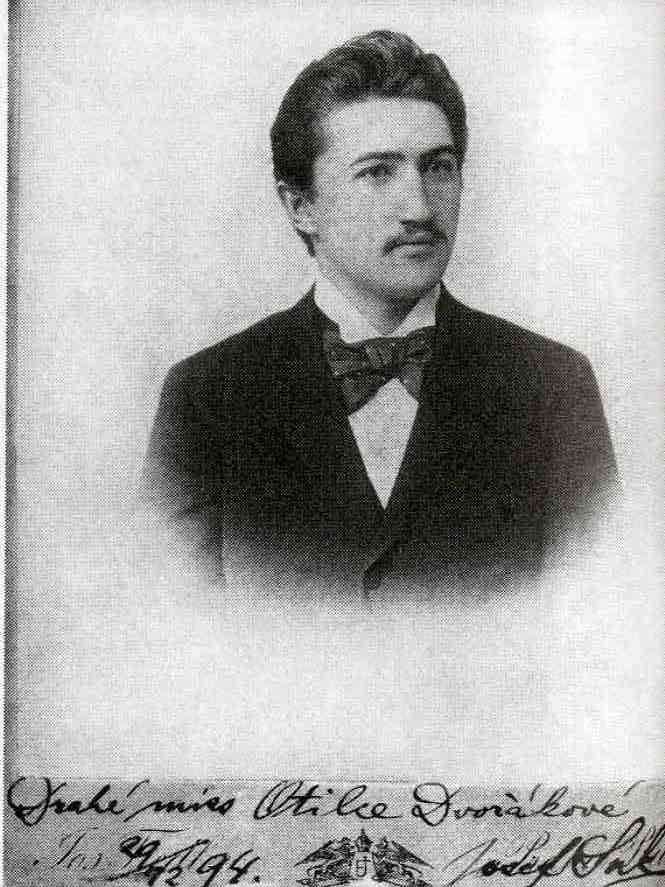
Photograph of young Josef Suk with dedication by Otilka Dvořáková

After returning to Bohemia, she met and eventually developed a deep emotional relationship with one of her father's students, Josef Suk, whom she married in Prague on 17 November 1898. He dedicated several of his compositions to her and she also inspired him to create the scenic fairy tale Radúz and Mahulena to a libretto by Julius Zeyer.

Dvořáková allegedly also received a marriage proposal from the music critic and theorist Zdeněk Nejedlý, but according to a widespread story, she rejected him and Antonín Dvořák threw him out of his house. Suk's compositional and concert era was gaining momentum at that time. The couple lived together in Prague and also in Suk's native Křečovice. In 1901, their son Josef was born, who became a professional engineer and talented amateur violinist and pianist and who, in turn, fathered a third generation Josef who was to become a celebrated violinist.

During his career, Josef Suk had to face attacks against his own and Dvořák's work (the infamous Battle for Dvořák), led by a group of critics led by Zdeněk Nejedlý, who rejected the alleged "conservative Dvořák line" in the name of the "progressive Smetana line". These attacks resulted in humiliating accusations and brought Suk to the brink of a nervous breakdown on several occasions. One of the causes of the hostility between Suk and Nejedlý is often cited as Otilie's long-standing rejection of Nejedlý.

=== Death ===
Otilie Dvořáková died on 5 July 1905 in Křečovice (Note: The afternoon edition of Národní listy from 6 July 1905 states that she died "yesterday at 10 o'clock in the evening", i.e. 5 July.) at the age of just 27 as a result of a congenital heart defect. The year before, the family was shocked by the news of the death of her father Antonín. She was buried in the Dvořák family tomb at the Vyšehrad Cemetery.

== After death ==
The sensitive Suk was deeply affected by both these family tragedies, and his work can be divided into two periods, separated by the deaths of his father-in-law and his wife. He dedicated his 1906 mourning symphony Asrael to her.

After Zdeněk Nejedlý served as the Czechoslovak Minister of Education from 1945 to 1946 and from 1948 to 1953, he continued to promote the musical legacy of Bedřich Smetana, very often at the expense of Dvořák and Suk, at the level of state-controlled cultural life.
