= Fairy Tale (Suk) =

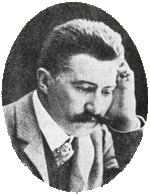
Josef Suk, early 1900s

Pohádka, Op. 16 (Fairy Tale) is an orchestral suite from incidental music composed for Julius Zeyer's mythological drama Radúz and Mahulena by Josef Suk in 1897–1898.

== Background ==
Zeyer's dramatic poem is a love story, combining classical fairy-tale motifs with mythological references. Suk started to write incidental music in 1897 and soon became very attached to the material. In the end, he wrote overtures to each scene, intermezzos, as well as various vocal solos and choruses. The play was first performed on 6 June 1898 at the National Theatre in Prague, under the baton of Adolf Čech. Because the chance of the play receiving regular staging was small, Suk decided to turn most of the music into a four-movement orchestral suite.

Suk began to work on the suite on 2 September 1899 at his home in Křečovice and completed the first two movements by the end of the month. Because of his extensive touring with Bohemian Quartet he didn't start to work on the third movement until 12 February the next year in Amsterdam. He completed the work back in Křečovice on 9 June 1900, dedicating it to Zdeňka Hlávková, wife of the architect and philanthropist Josef Hlávka.

== Structure ==
1. O věrném milování Radúze a Mahuleny a jejich strastech (About the Constant Love of Raduz and Mahulena and Their Trials)
2. Intermezzo: Hra na labutě a pávy (Playing at Swans and Peacocks)
3. Intermezzo: Smuteční hudba (Funeral Music)
4. Runy kletba a jak byla láskou zrušena (Runa's Curse and How It was Broken by True Love)

== Instrumentation ==
The work is scored for a large orchestra: 2 flutes, piccolo, 2 oboes, English horn, 2 clarinets, bass clarinet in A, 2 bassoons, 4 horns in E and F, 2 trumpets in E and C, 3 trombones, tuba, timpani, cymbals, bass drum, tam-tam, triangle, harp and strings: violins I, II, violas, cellos, double basses.

== Performance ==
The first performance of the suite was given by the Czech Philharmonic at Rudolfinum, Prague on 7 February 1901. The conductor was Suk's colleague from the Bohemian Quartet, Oskar Nedbal. The autograph score carries a dedication to him: “To my dear friend Oskar Nedbal, the Godfather of the Symphony and Fairy Tale, with sincere thanks for his understanding and performance this manuscript is dedicated —Josef Suk”. Antonín Dvořák wrote about the piece: “That is music from heaven”. The Suite was revised in 1912, and remains one of Suk's most successful works.

== Recordings ==
- Václav Talich, Czech Philharmonic; Supraphon, 1949
- Jiří Bělohlávek, Prague Symphony Orchestra; Supraphon, 1982
- Libor Pešek, Czech Philharmonic; Supraphon, 1989
- Libor Pešek, Royal Liverpool Philharmonic Orchestra; Virgin, 1997
- JoAnn Falletta, Buffalo Philharmonic Orchestra; Naxos, 2011
