= Ripening (Suk) =

Tone poem by Josef Suk

Ripening (Czech: Zrání), Op. 34 is a tone poem for large orchestra and women's chorus by Josef Suk. Composition was completed in 1917. The work completed the triptych of symphonic works that starts with the Asrael Symphony and A Summer's Tale.

== Structure and character ==
The work was inspired by the same-named poem by Antonín Sova. It is in seven sections.

Rob Cowan has written "There can't be many orchestral works in the repertoire that better approximate, in musical terms, the blossoming of life in the face of conflict, even tragedy".

Don O'Connor wrote for the American Record Guide that the piece represented "Suk's art at its peak and compares favorably with the best tone poems of Scriabin and Richard Strauss".

== Performance and recording ==
The work received its premiere in 1918.
