= Josef Suk Memorial =

- Památník Josefa Suka
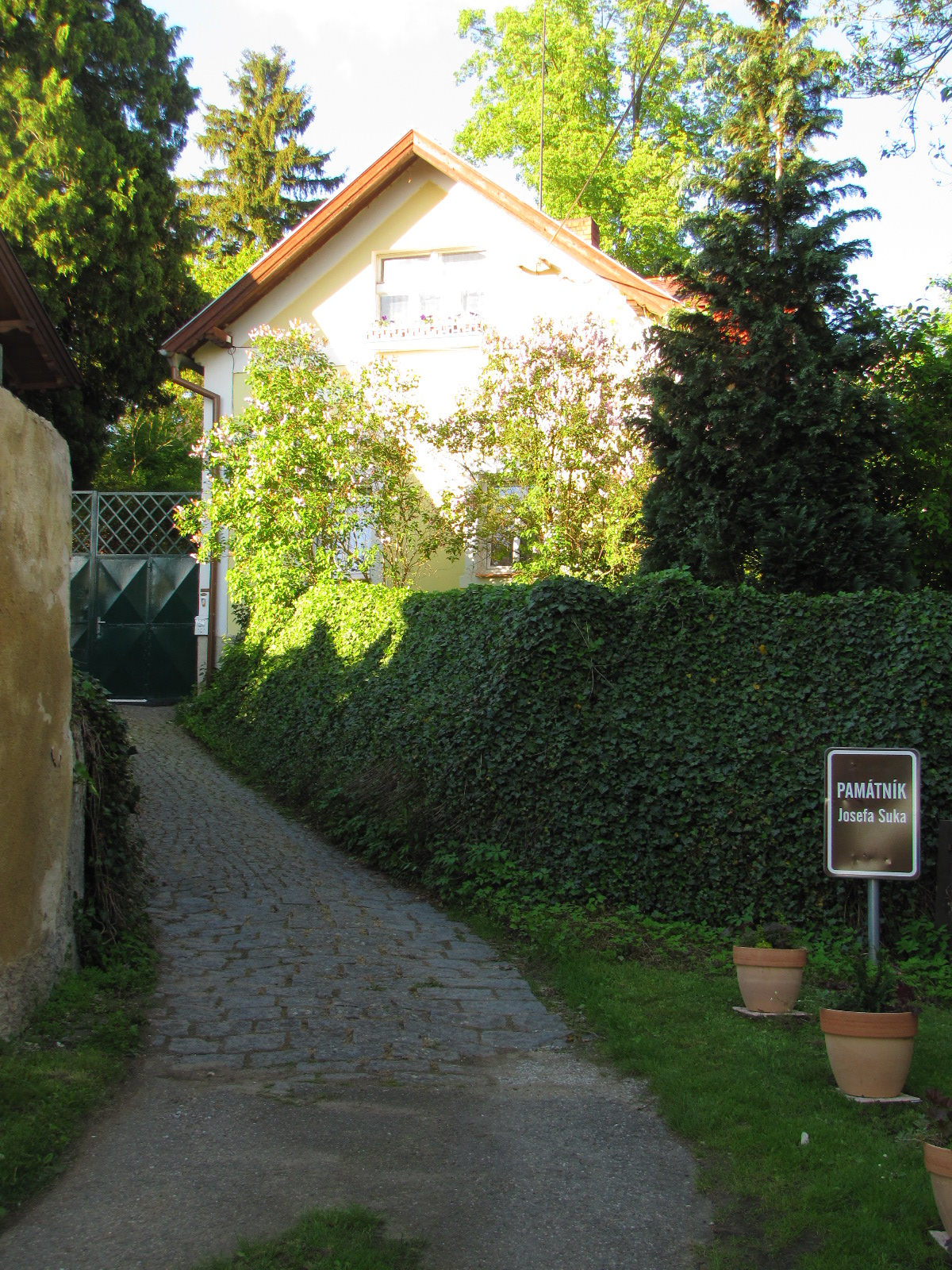
- Interactive map of the Josef Suk Memorial area

General information
- Location: Křečovice, Czech Republic
- Coordinates: 49°43′19.3″N 14°28′36.4″E
- Completed: 1895

Website
- www.nm.cz/en/czech-museum-of-music/josef-suk-memorial

Josef Suk Memorial (Czech: Památník Josefa Suka) is a museum in Křečovice in the Central Bohemian Region of the Czech Republic. It was the home of the composer and violinist Josef Suk (1874–1935), and is now a museum dedicated to him.

== Description ==
The house was built for the composer in 1895 by his father Josef Suk senior, a head teacher and director of the church choir in the village of Křečovice. The Bohemian Quartet, of which Suk was a founding member, rehearsed here, and he composed most of his works here.

After his death, his son Josef Suk (father of the violinist Josef Suk) made the house into a museum dedicated to the composer, and in 1951 he donated the house to the state. It became in 1956 a branch of the Antonín Dvořák Museum in Prague.

The museum has some original furnishings. It displays items relating to the life and work of the composer, and about the Bohemian Quartet. There is also some of his collection of decorative glassware and ceramics.

== See also ==
- List of music museums
