= Michal Hrůza =

Czech musician (born 1971)

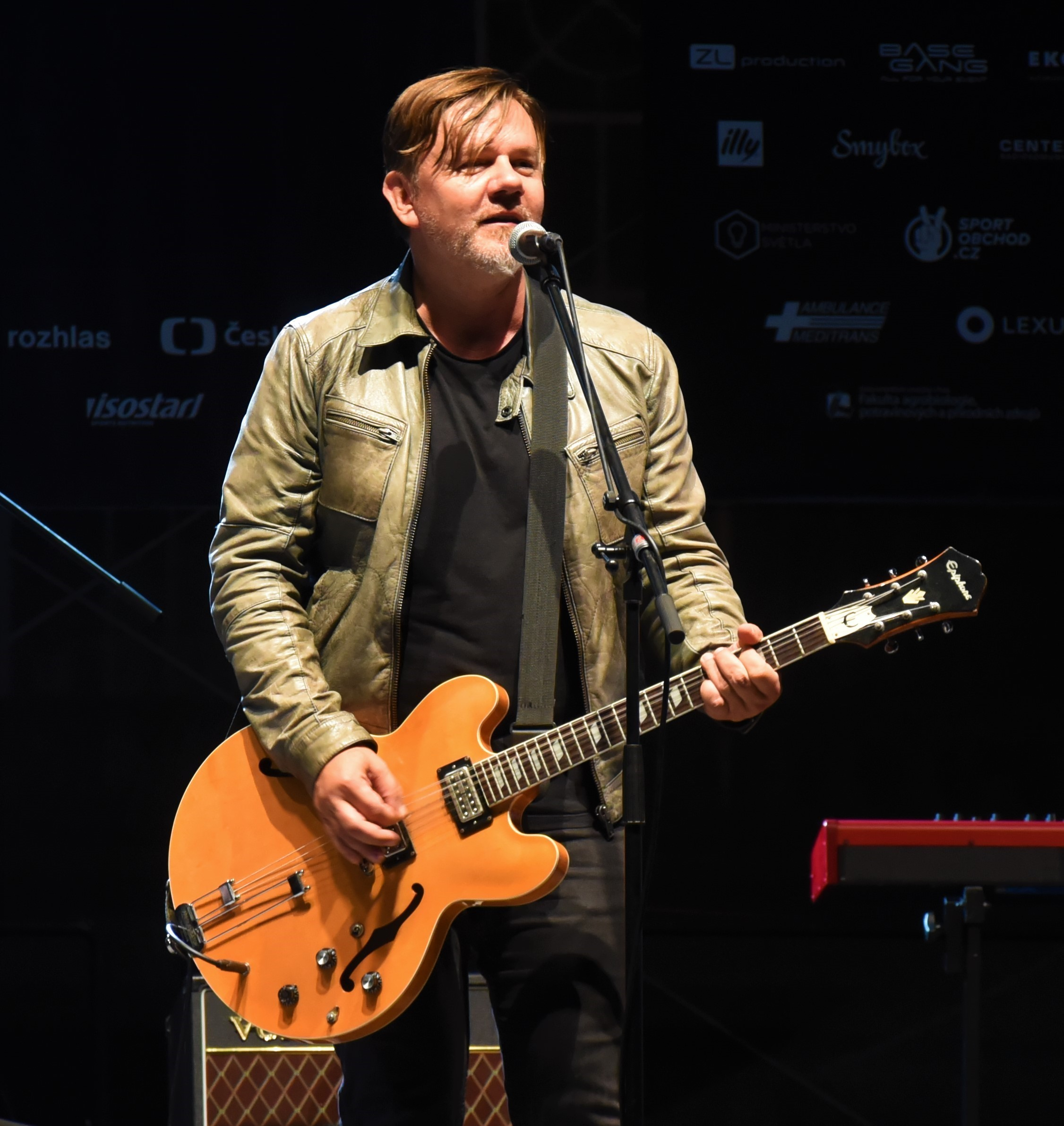
- Hrůza in 2021

Background information
- Born: 31 August 1971 (age 54); Turnov, Czechoslovakia
- Genres: Rock; pop
- Occupations: Musician, composer
- Instruments: Vocals, guitar
- Years active: 1990s–present
- Member of: Kapela Hrůzy
- Formerly of: Ready Kirken
- Website: michalhruza.cz

Michal Hrůza (born 31 August 1971) is a Czech singer and guitarist, and founding member of the band Ready Kirken, with whom he recorded five studio albums, before leaving in 2006. He subsequently launched a solo career and performs with his own band, Kapela Hrůzy, who are sometimes credited on his albums. As of 2026, he has issued six studio albums, two live albums, and one compilation. Hrůza has also contributed music to several film soundtracks, including Lidice (2011), Martin a Venuše (2013), Zakázané uvolnění (2014), Padesátka (2015), Pohádky pro Emu (2016), and Špunti na vodě (2017), as well as the television series Slunečná (2020–22). In 2014, he won the Anděl Award for Male Singer of the Year. In 2015, he was a member of the jury selecting the Czech representative for the Eurovision Song Contest.

== 2014 injury ==
On 17 July 2014, during a street fight in Ostrava, Hrůza suffered a serious head injury accompanied by bleeding to the brain, leaving him unconscious. He was operated upon the same day and remained in an induced coma until 30 July. The assailants, two young men, whose fight the singer tried to break up, were charged with extortion and rioting and subsequently placed under arrest.

== Discography ==
with Ready Kirken

- Ready Kirken (1996)
- Vlny (2001)
- Čekal jsem víc (2002)
- Krasohled (2004)
- Asi se něco děje (2006)

Solo

- 12 nej as Michal Hrůza & Ready Kirken (compilation, 2006)
- Bílá velryba (2007)
- Napořád (2009)
- Noc (2012)
- GN Acoustic Stage with Kapela Hrůzy (live, 2013)
- Den (2014)
- Sám se sebou (2017)
- V Rudolfinu (live, 2018)
- Světlo do Tmy (2020)
- Hity & příběhy (Best of 2001–2021) with Kapela Hrůzy (2021)

Soundtrack contributions

- Lidice (2011)
- Martin a Venuše (2013)
- Zakázané uvolnění (2014)
- Padesátka (2015)
- Pohádky pro Emu (2016)
- Špunti na vodě (2017)
- Slunečná (2020–2022)
