= Batelov =

- Market town
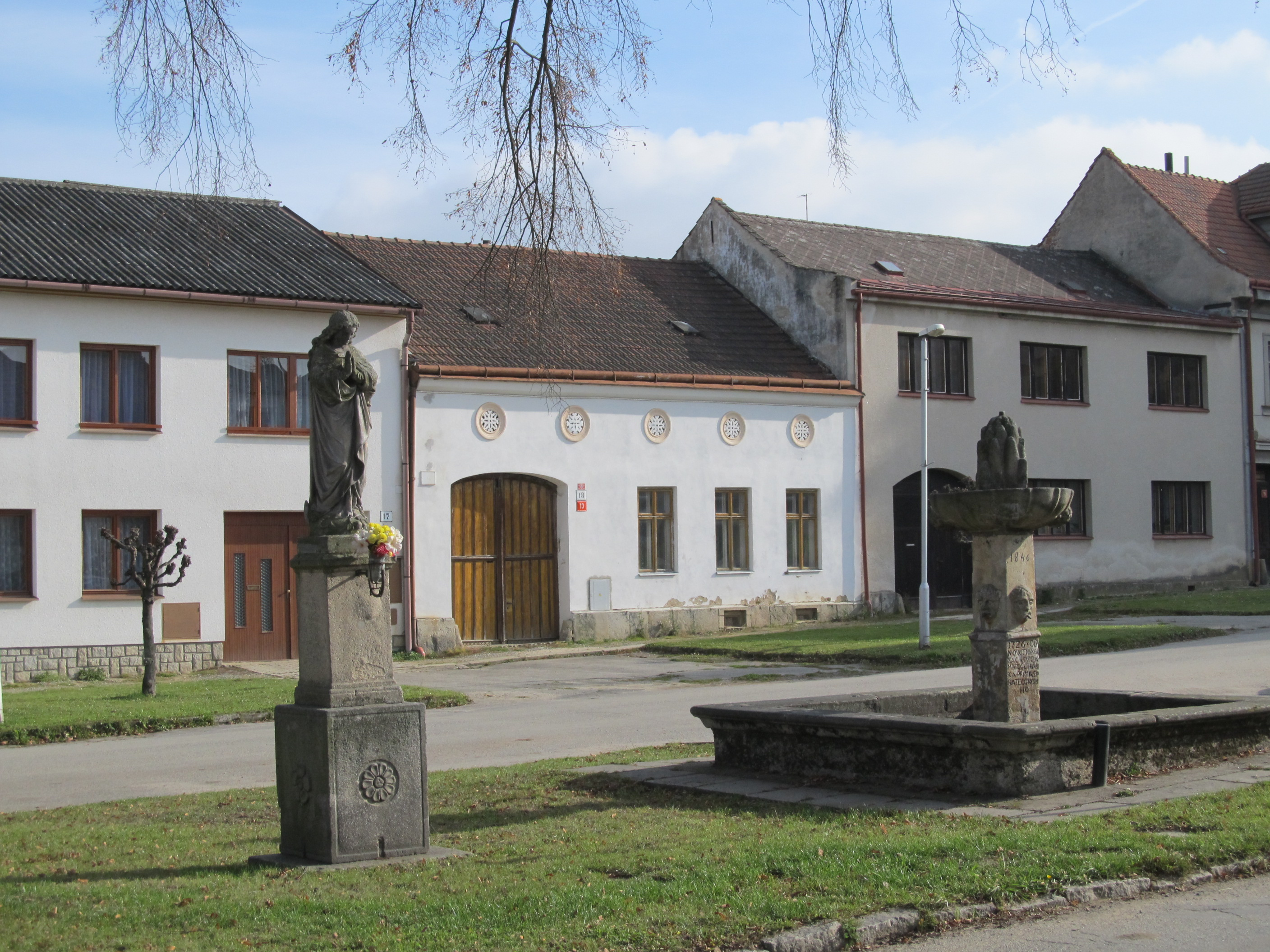
- The square Náměstí Míru

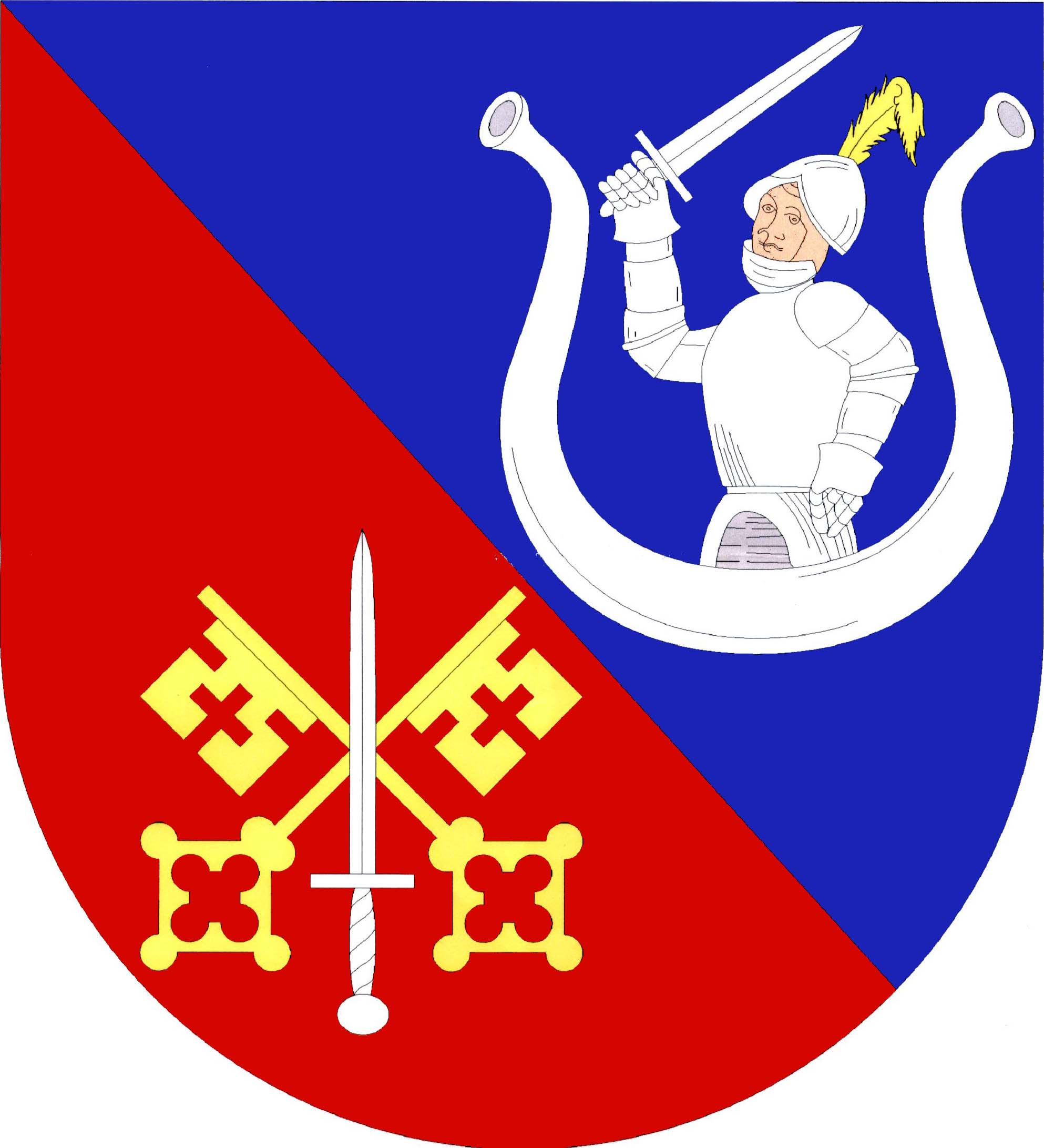
- Flag Coat of arms

- Location in the Czech Republic
- Coordinates: 49°18′52″N 15°23′41″E
- Country: Czech Republic
- Region: Vysočina
- District: Jihlava
- First mentioned: 1272

Area
  - Total: 42.70 km^{2} (16.49 sq mi)
- Elevation: 552 m (1,811 ft)

Population (2026-01-01)
  - Total: 2,458
  - Density: 57.56/km^{2} (149.1/sq mi)
- Time zone: UTC+1 (CET)
  - Summer (DST): UTC+2 (CEST)
- Postal code: 588 51
- Website: www.batelov.cz

Batelov (Czech pronunciation: [ˈbatɛlof]; German: Battelau) is a market town in Jihlava District in the Vysočina Region of the Czech Republic. It has about 2,500 inhabitants.

== Administrative division ==
Batelov consists of five municipal parts (in brackets population according to the 2021 census):

- Batelov (1,783)
- Bezděčín (98)
- Lovětín (102)
- Nová Ves (188)
- Rácov (105)

== Etymology ==
The name is derived from the personal name Batel.

== Geography ==
Batelov is located about 16 kilometres (10 mi) southwest of Jihlava. The municipal territory lies in three geomorphological regions: the central part lies in the Křižanov Highlands, the northern part lies in the Křemešník Highlands, and the southern forested part lies in the Javořice Highlands. The highest point is the hill Rovina at 761 m (2,497 ft) above sea level. The Jihlava River flows through Batelov. There are several fishponds around the market town.

== History ==
The first written mention of Batelov is from 1272. The original settlement was founded in a part called Na Vůbci. The owners changed often and included various lesser noble families. In 1534, Batelov was promoted to a market town.

== Demographics ==
Historical population

Year	Pop.	±%
1869	3,271	—
1880	3,208	−1.9%
1890	3,274	+2.1%
1900	3,278	+0.1%
1910	3,365	+2.7%

Year	Pop.	±%
1921	3,214	−4.5%
1930	3,042	−5.4%
1950	2,293	−24.6%
1961	2,486	+8.4%
1970	2,389	−3.9%

Year	Pop.	±%
1980	2,363	−1.1%
1991	2,286	−3.3%
2001	2,393	+4.7%
2011	2,247	−6.1%
2021	2,276	+1.3%

Source: Censuses

== Transport ==
Batelov is located on the major railway lines Brno–Plzeň and Jihlava–Tábor.

== Sights ==
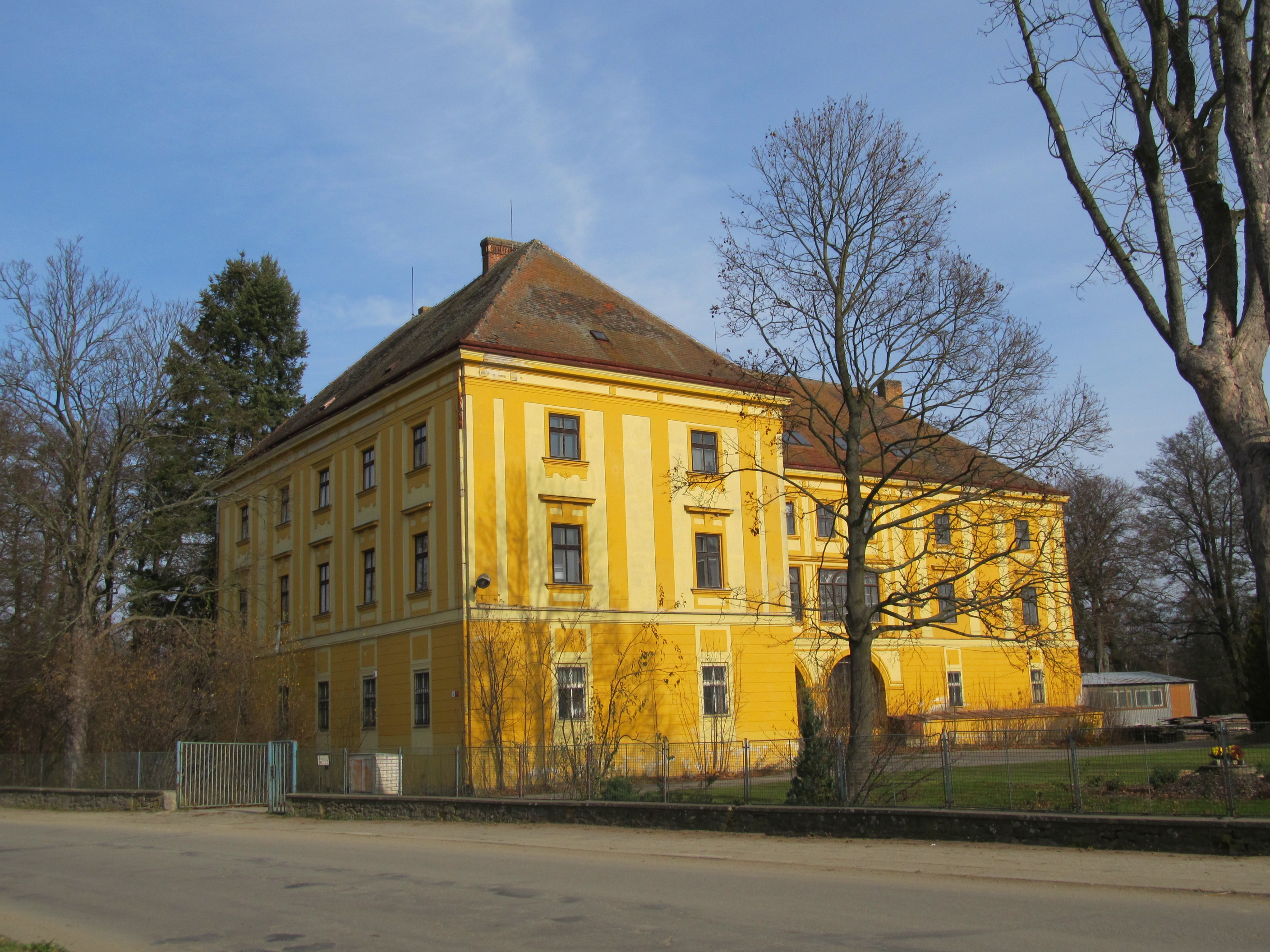
Nový zámek

The landmark of the town square is the Church of Saints Peter and Paul. The church was built in the mid-18th century and has a Neoclassical façade from 1836. A staircase lined with several valuable statues leads to the church.

There are two castles in Batelov called Starý zámek ('old castle') and Nový zámek ('new castle'). Starý zámek is a one-storey Renaissance building from the second half of the 16th century. It served mostly as an administrative seat. Nový zámek is a Neoclassical building with Renaissance core, which served as the seat of the nobility.

== Notable people ==
- Zdeněk Mahler (1928–2018), writer, screenwriter and musicologist
