= Anna Dvořáková =

Czech contralto singer and violist (1854-1931)

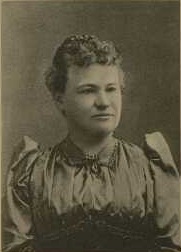
Anna Dvořáková

Anna Dvořáková (née Čermáková; 17 June 1854 – 14 July 1931) was a Czech contralto singer and violist. She was a student of the composer Antonín Dvořák, and became his wife.

== Life ==
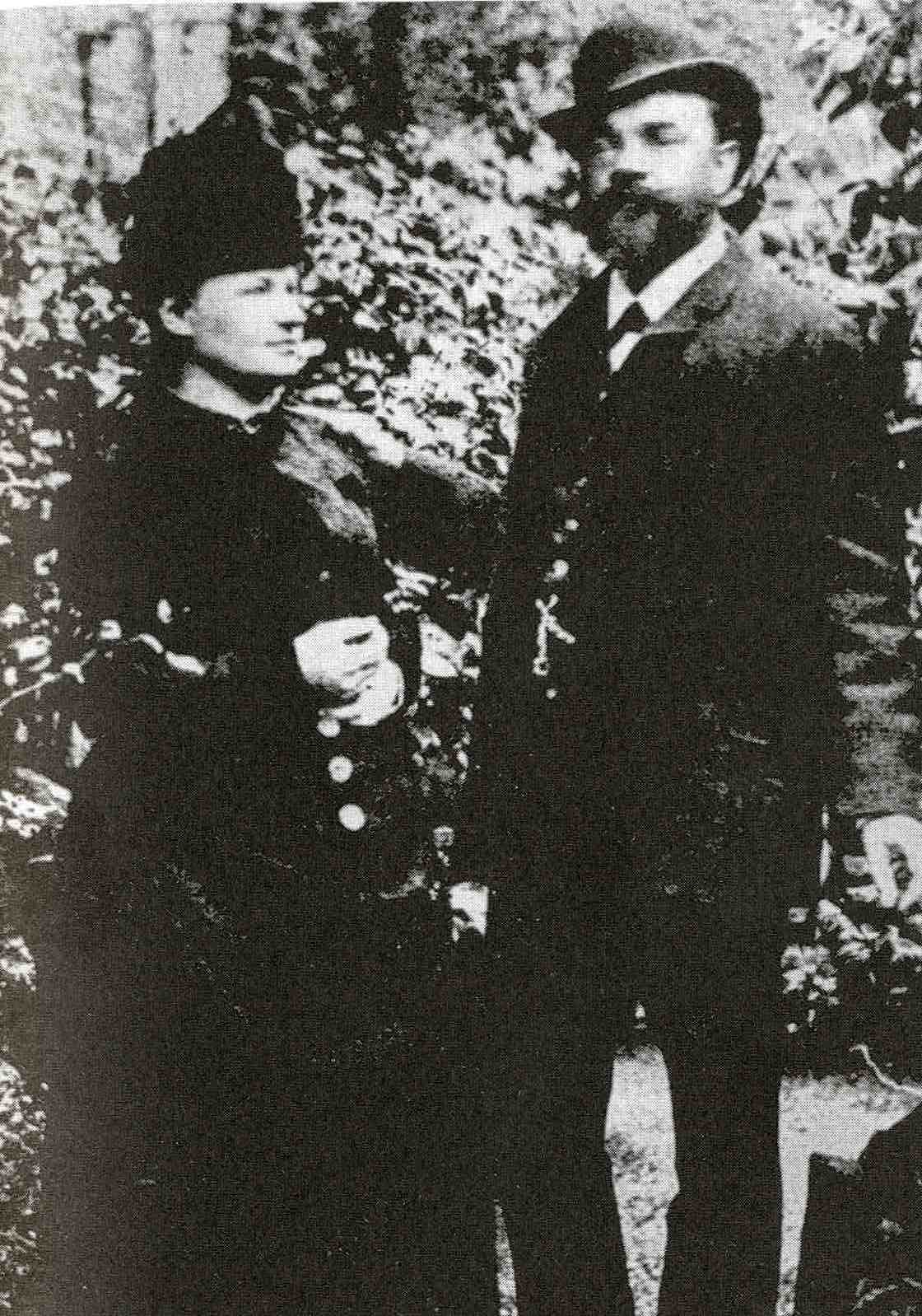
Dvořáková with her husband Antonín Dvořák in London, 1886

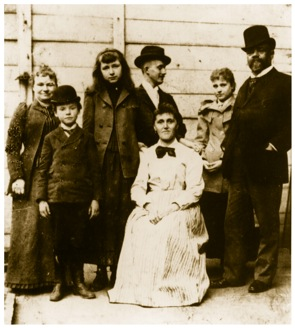
Dvořák with his family and friends in New York in 1893 - from left: his wife Anna, son Antonín, Sadie Siebert, Josef Jan Kovařík (secretary), mother of Sadie Siebert, daughter Otilie, Antonín.

Anna Čermáková was born on 17 June 1854 in Prague. She was the younger sister of the actress Josefína Čermáková-Kounicová.

On 17 November 1873, Antonín Dvořák and Anna Čermáková married. By then, although legally still considered a minor, she was four months pregnant with their first child. They went on to have nine children, of whom the first three died in infancy. The children were: Otakar (1874–1877), Josefa (1875–1875), Růžena (1876–1877), Otýlie (1878–1905), Anna (1880–1923), Magdalena (1881–1952), Antonín (1883–1956), Otakar (1885–1961) and Aloisie (1888–1967). In 1898 Otýlie, a composer in her own right, married Dvorak's student, the composer Josef Suk, but died of a heart condition only seven years later.

From 1880, she sang in a Russian church in Prague, and sang Antonín Dvořák's cantatas in concerts, especially solos in his Stabat mater, and a solo in his Requiem.

She also travelled with her husband, and in 1892–1895, they lived with part of their family in New York. In later life, Otakar wrote in his book "Antonin Dvorak, My Father", that it had been Anna who had persuaded Antonin to take on the appointment in the United States, in particular for financial reasons. She had even held a family vote one meal-time, and delivered the signed contract to the post-office herself.

Dvořáková died on 14 July 1931 in Vysoká u Příbramě.
