= Serenade for Strings (Dvořák) =

Orchestral work by Antonín Dvořák

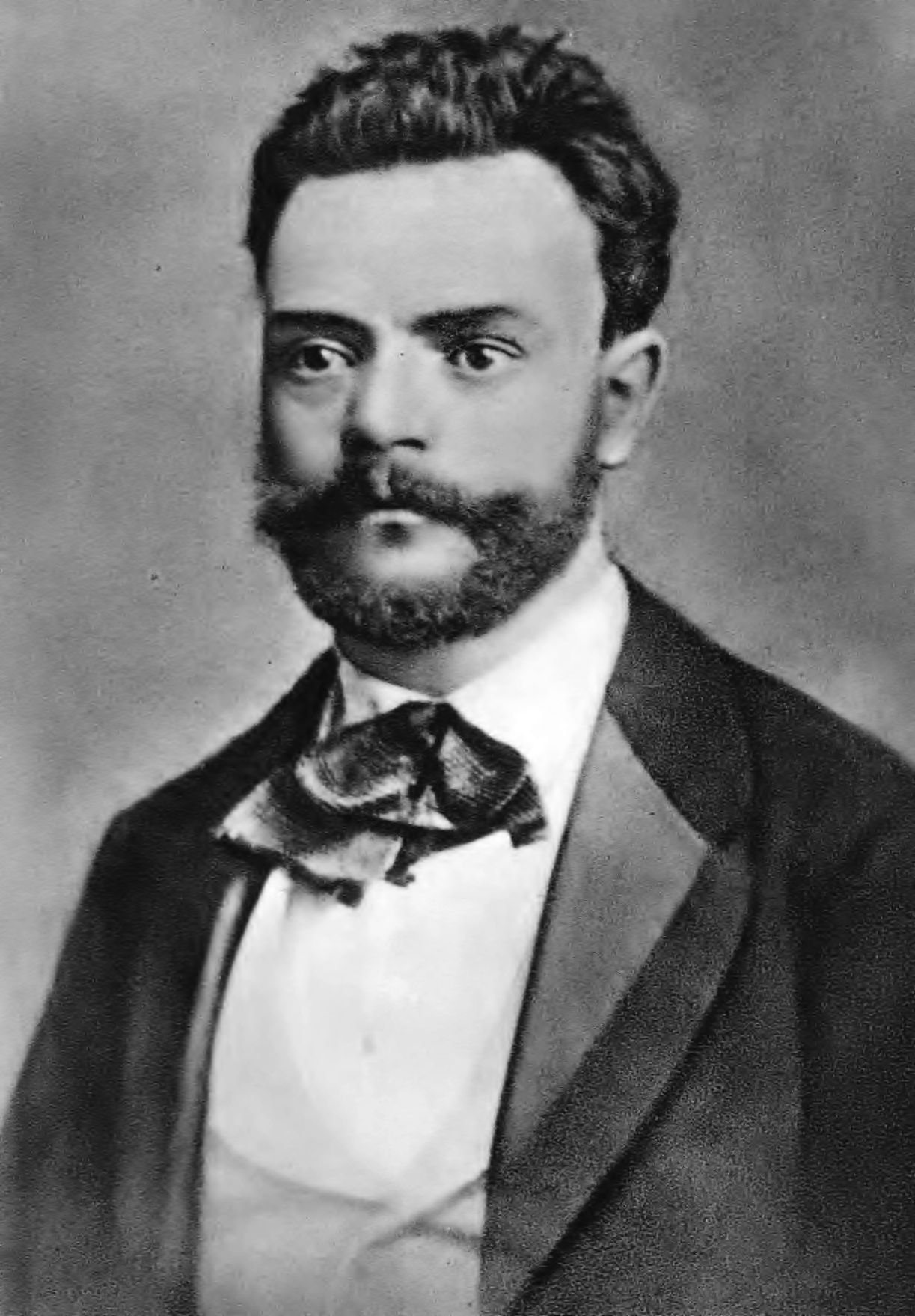
Antonín Dvořák in 1870

Antonín Dvořák's Serenade for Strings in E major (Czech: Smyčcová serenáda E dur), Op. 22 (B. 52), is one of the composer's most popular orchestral works. It was composed in the first two weeks of May 1875.

== Composition and premiere ==
By 1875, Dvořák was gaining recognition as a composer. He received a generous stipend from a commission in Vienna, allowing him to write the Serenade, in addition to Symphony No. 5, String Quintet No. 2, Piano Trio No. 1, the opera Vanda, and the Moravian Duets. Dvořák is said to have written the Serenade in just 12 days, from 3 to 14 May.

The piece premiered in Prague on 10 December 1876 by Adolf Čech and the combined orchestras of the Czech and German theatres. Dvořák's piano duet arrangement was published in Prague in 1877 by Emanuel Starý. Two years later, Bote & Bock published the score in Berlin.

== Form ==
Dvořák's Serenade for Strings consists of five movements:

1. Moderato
2. Tempo di Valse
3. Scherzo: Vivace
4. Larghetto
5. Finale: Allegro vivace

With the exception of the finale, which is in modified sonata form, each movement follows a rough ABA form. It is believed that Dvořák took up this small orchestral genre because it was less demanding than the symphony, but allowed for the provision of pleasure and entertainment. The piece combines cantabile style (first movement), a slow waltz (second movement), humorous high spirits (third movement), lyrical beauty (fourth movement) and exuberance (fifth movement).

== Scoring ==
The work is scored for full string orchestra, with staves for Violin I & 2, Viola (divisi), Cello (divisi) and Contrabass (double bass). It is typically performed with 4–6 instruments per part, though usually 2 or 3 double basses are sufficient.

== Movements ==
=== I. Moderato ===
I. Moderato
Performed by the Virtual Philharmonic Orchestra (Reinhold Behringer) with digital samples

The first movement starts off the Serenade in the key of E major. The second violins and cellos introduce the lyrical main theme over an eighth note pulse in the violas. The theme is traded back and forth, and the second violins reprise it under a soaring passage in the firsts.

At measure 31, the movement modulates into G major and presents a new, dancelike theme, based on a dotted rhythm. At measure 54, the movement modulates back into E major and the primary theme returns. The movement ends on three E major chords.

=== II. Tempo di Valse ===
II. Tempo di Valse
Performed by the Virtual Philharmonic Orchestra (Reinhold Behringer) with digital samples

The second movement, a waltz, opens with a lilting dance melody in C♯ minor. The first section repeats, and the second section begins in E Mixolydian. A string of eighth notes in the violins transitions into the second theme in A major. The first theme returns, and Part A is closed with a cadential fortissimo C-sharp minor chord.

Part B opens with a modulation into the enharmonic parallel major of D♭ major. This section's theme is developed, and then Part A returns. The movement ends on a C♯ major chord.

=== III. Scherzo: Vivace ===
III. Scherzo: Vivace
Performed by the Virtual Philharmonic Orchestra (Reinhold Behringer) with digital samples

The third movement is a lively, hyperactive Scherzo in F major. The theme is stated and subsequently developed in sections of different tempos and moods, including a foray into A major. The most monothematic movement yet, the scherzo ends with a coda combining material from the scherzo and trio.

=== IV. Larghetto ===
IV. Larghetto
Performed by the Advent Chamber Orchestra

The slow movement of the Serenade is tranquil and wistful. Its flowing melodies and tender phrases form a buffer between the vigorous third and fifth movements. The third theme of the second movement is quoted repeatedly throughout.

=== V. Finale: Allegro vivace ===
V. Finale: Allegro vivace
Performed by the Virtual Philharmonic Orchestra (Reinhold Behringer) with digital samples

The fifth movement is a lively, offbeat finale, conveying the spirit of a Bohemian village dance. The principal theme is a descending figure based on thirds with accents on weak beats. More thematic material enters at bar 32 as the violins and cellos trade calls and responses over running eighths in the violas. A third theme based primarily on sixteenth-note upbeats appears at bar 87. A wistful recollection of the melody from the preceding Larghetto appears and then diminuendos away.

The movement's recapitulation starts with the main theme, followed in turn by the second and third themes. A 20-bar eighth-note passage leads into a quotation of the first movement's theme, bringing the piece full circle. A Presto coda follows, and the Serenade ends with three E major chords.

== Performance history ==
List of notable performances of Dvořák's Serenade for Strings, except the premiere.

- Brünn, Austria-Hungary: 22 April 1877, conducted by Leoš Janáček
- Leipnik, Austria-Hungary: August 1877, conducted by Dvořák himself
- Prague, Austria-Hungary: 17 November 1878, conducted by Dvořák himself
- Chrudim, Austria-Hungary: 24 April 1879, conducted by Dvořák himself
- Jungbunzlau, Austria-Hungary: 27 October 1879, conducted by Dvořák himself
- Prague, Austria-Hungary: 17 April 1887, conducted by Dvořák himself
- Prague, Austria-Hungary: 13 October 1894, conducted by Dvořák himself

== Quotes and interpretation ==
The Serenade (Op. 22) was aptly entitled, since at least four of its five movements (the second of which was a delightful waltz) displayed an elegant touch suggestive of gracious living accompanied by 'serenading' in the stately home of some 18th-century aristocrat; in the finale alone did the composer discard periwig and lace cuffs, and even here the junketing, though lively, was well-bred, and in the closing moments there was a delicious return to the courtliness of the opening. Pastiche perhaps, but what excellent pastiche! Since Dvořák was as yet only on the threshold of developing an individual style, it is perhaps not surprising that this slightly uncharacteristic but extremely accomplished and enjoyable Serenade is the earliest of his compositions in which a detached listener is likely to discover enchantment.

— Gervase Hughes 1967

Just like delivering good news to someone has a positive rub-off effect on the messenger, performing Dvořák's Serenade is really a very therapeutic endeavor for performers. There is so much 'pure goodness' in it. Somehow even the moments which could cast a gloomy shadow – light melancholy of the Waltz, or the fragility of the opening of Larghetto – retain the wonderfully cloudless atmosphere... The remarkable thing about Dvořák's Serenade – this 'cloudless goodness' is fully sufficient for sustaining meaningful communication for nearly half an hour of music.

— Misha Rachlevsky, 2000

== See also ==
- Serenade for Strings (Elgar)
- Serenade for Strings (Tchaikovsky)
- Serenade for Strings (Suk)
