= Josefína Čermáková-Kounicová =

Czech stage actress

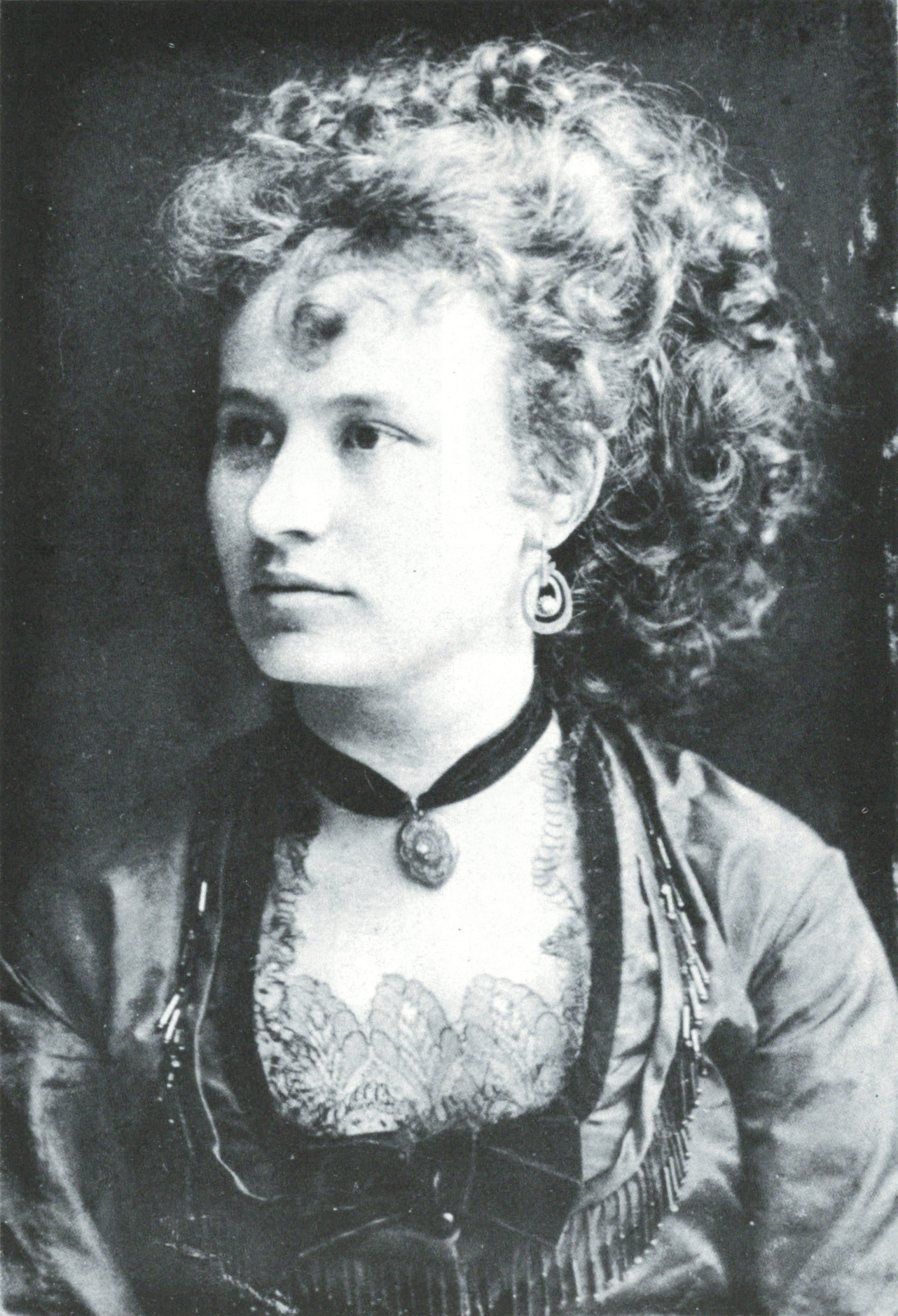
Čermáková in 1872

Josefína Čermáková, married name Countess Kounicová (17 January 1849 – 27 May 1895) was a Czech stage actress. She was a sister of Anna Dvořáková and sister-in-law of the composer Antonín Dvořák.

== Early life and education ==
Josefina Čermáková was baptised as Josepha Čermák, having been born on 17 January 1849 in Prague into the family of the Prague goldsmith Jan Jiří Čermák. She grew up with four other sisters and from early childhood was introduced, together with her sisters, to music, among other things cultural. Josepha and her younger sister Anna were taught piano by the then unknown Antonín Dvořák. Later Josefína encountered Dvořák at performances at the Prague Provisional Theatre, where he played the viola in the orchestra. Dvořák secretly loved her, but his feelings were not reciprocated. At that time, she had higher goals and he (Dvořák) was just one of a long line of rejected admirers. However, her younger sister was more receptive to Dvořák's feelings, and so he married Anna in 1873.

== Theatrical career ==
Josefína had been drawn to the theatre since her youth, she was a pupil of the theatre actress Eliška Pešková and from 1862 she was a member of the Prague Provisional Theatre, where she exploited her talent and achieved considerable success. Alongside Otilie Sklenářová-Malá and Julie Šamberková, she was one of the best Czech actresses, playing the roles of naive and sentimental women and particularly excelling in the French repertoire, and for a while also appearing in operetta roles. In 1873 she accepted an engagement at the court theatre in Weimar, Germany. Later she also performed as a guest and "on the boards" of Czech theatres.

== Personal life ==
In 1872 she met Count Václav Robert of Kounice at a ball. At the end of 1877, after a five-year courtship, she married Count Kounic in a church in Třebsko; Antonín Dvořák was their best man. After the wedding, she left the theatre permanently, lived at the castle in Vysoká u Příbramě and also traveled frequently with her husband, most often to Vienna, after the Count had become a member of the Reichsrat. Their marriage remained childless. At the age of thirty, she began to have heart problems, which persisted until the end of her life. She and Antonín Dvořák remained lifelong friends and she supervised the upbringing of some of their children while the Dvořáks were in America. Countess Josefina Kounicová died on 27 May 1895 in Smíchov, shortly after Dvořák's return from America.

The composition of one of Dvořák's most famous works, the Cello Concerto in B minor, is also associated with the personality of Josefina Kounicová. While the composer was working on it, Josefina was dying, and Dvořák reverently included in the concerto a quotation from Josefina's favorite song "Leave Me Alone"/ Lasst mich allein (Kéž duch můj sám) from the cycle "Four Songs, Op. 82".
