= Jan Maria Plojhar =

Jan Maria Plojhar is a Czech novel, written by Julius Zeyer. Written in late 1887 and early 1888, it was first published in 1891.

It is a tragedy about a Czech poet living abroad in Greece and Italy, who is incurably ill with tuberculosis after a chest wound suffered in a duel. In an effort to find a muse, the protagonist, Jan Maria Plojhar, has affairs with three women, including a married Romanian called Mrs Dragopulos, described as a femme fatale, and a prostitute called Gemma.

Czech history is also a theme of the novel, and Plojhar is used as a symbol of the Czech state.

== Works ==
- Brusak, K. (1969). "Zeyer, Julius". In Thorlby, Anthony (ed.). The Penguin Companion to Literature. Vol. 2 (European Literature). Penguin Books. p. 838. ISBN 9780140510355.
- Chew, Geoffrey (2003). "Reinterpreting Janáček and Kamila: Dangerous Liaisons in Czech Fin-de-Siècle Music and Literature". In Beckerman, Michael (ed.). Janáček And His World. Princeton University Press. pp. 99–144. ISBN 1400832098.
- Bažant, Jan; Bažantová, Nina; Starn, Frances, eds. (2010). "Self-Determination to Cosmopolitanism". The Czech Reader: History, Culture, Politics. Duke University Press. p. 197. ISBN 978-0-8223-4794-1.
- Thomas, Alfred (2003). "Forging Czechs: The Reinvention of National Identity in the Bohemian Lands". In Ryan, Judith; Thomas, Alfred (eds.). Cultures of Forgery: Making Nations Making Selves. Routledge. pp. 29–52. ISBN 1-135-45820-0.
