= Lidice (film) =

2011 Czech drama film

- United Kingdom poster
- Directed by: Petr Nikolaev
- Written by: Zdeněk Mahler
- Screenplay by: Zdeněk Mahler; Alice Nellis
- Based on: The Man Who Survived Lidice by Zdeněk Mahler
- Produced by: Adam Dvořák
- Starring: Karel Roden; Zuzana Fialová; Zuzana Bydzovská
- Cinematography: Antonio Riestra
- Edited by: Adam Dvořák
- Music by: Michal Hrůza; James Harries; Karel Heřman
- Production company: Movie
- Distributed by: Bioscop
- Release date: 2 June 2011 (Czech Republic)
- Running time: 126 minutes
- Countries: Czech Republic; Slovakia
- Language: Czech
- Budget: 70,000,000 Kč

Lidice (also known as The Butcher of Prague and Fall of the Innocent in the UK) is a 2011 Czech drama film produced by Adam Dvořák from a screenplay by Zdeněk Mahler. It was initially directed by Alice Nellis, but after she contracted Lyme disease (borreliosis), Petr Nikolaev took over. It tells a story involving the Nazi massacre at—and destruction of—the Czech village of Lidice. It was released in June 2011.

The budget of the film was around 65–70 million Kč (around US $4 million).

== Plot ==
The film is based one The Man Who Survived Lidice by Zdeněk Mahler, a true story set during World War II. With the German takeover of Europe under way, the deputy Reichsprotektor Reinhard Heydrich arrives in Prague and his underlings begin enforcing his authority in the towns and villages across the occupied country. In Lidice, the film's main protagonist, František Šíma, is sent to prison following a family dispute that boils over resulting in the accidental death of one of his sons. During Šíma's incarceration one of the other villagers, Václav Fiala, strings along his mistress with lies about his bravery as a resistance fighter against the Germans. Heydrich is assassinated and during the Gestapo investigation that follows, a letter Fiala has written describing his supposed heroism comes to their attention. It leads to the total destruction of Lidice and the mass execution and deportations of its citizens. Throughout the atrocity, Šíma remains in jail, where news of what happened is kept from him. On his release, he returns to Lidice, where he finds the village has been obliterated and finally learns of the tragic events.

== Cast ==
- Karel Roden as František Šíma
- Zuzana Fialová as Marie Vaňková
- Zuzana Bydžovská as Anežka Šímová
- Marek Adamczyk as Václav Fiala
- Veronika Khek Kubařová as Anička
- Roman Luknár as Vlček
- Ondřej Novák as Karel Šíma
- Adam Kubišta as Eda Šíma
- Norbert Lichý as Mayor
- Jan Budař as Safecracker Petiška
- Václav Jiráček as Josef Horák
- Joachim Paul Assböck as Harald Wiesmann
- Sabina Remundová as Tonička Farská
- Anna Kratochvílová as Růženka
- Ondřej Havel as Toník
- Marika Šoposká as Helenka
- Detlef Bothe as Reinhard Heydrich

== Production ==
Filming started on 26 July 2010 at the Mladá Boleslav prison, with Karel Schwarzenberg attending the first cut. The shoot lasted 49 days and involved locations including Nové Strašecí, and a secondary school in Kladno. The scenes portraying Lidice were shot at the village of Chcebuz near Štětí.

The first promotional posters appeared at the film festival in Karlovy Vary 2010 on 8 July 2010.
