= Zdeněk Mahler =

Czech musicologist and writer (1928–2018)

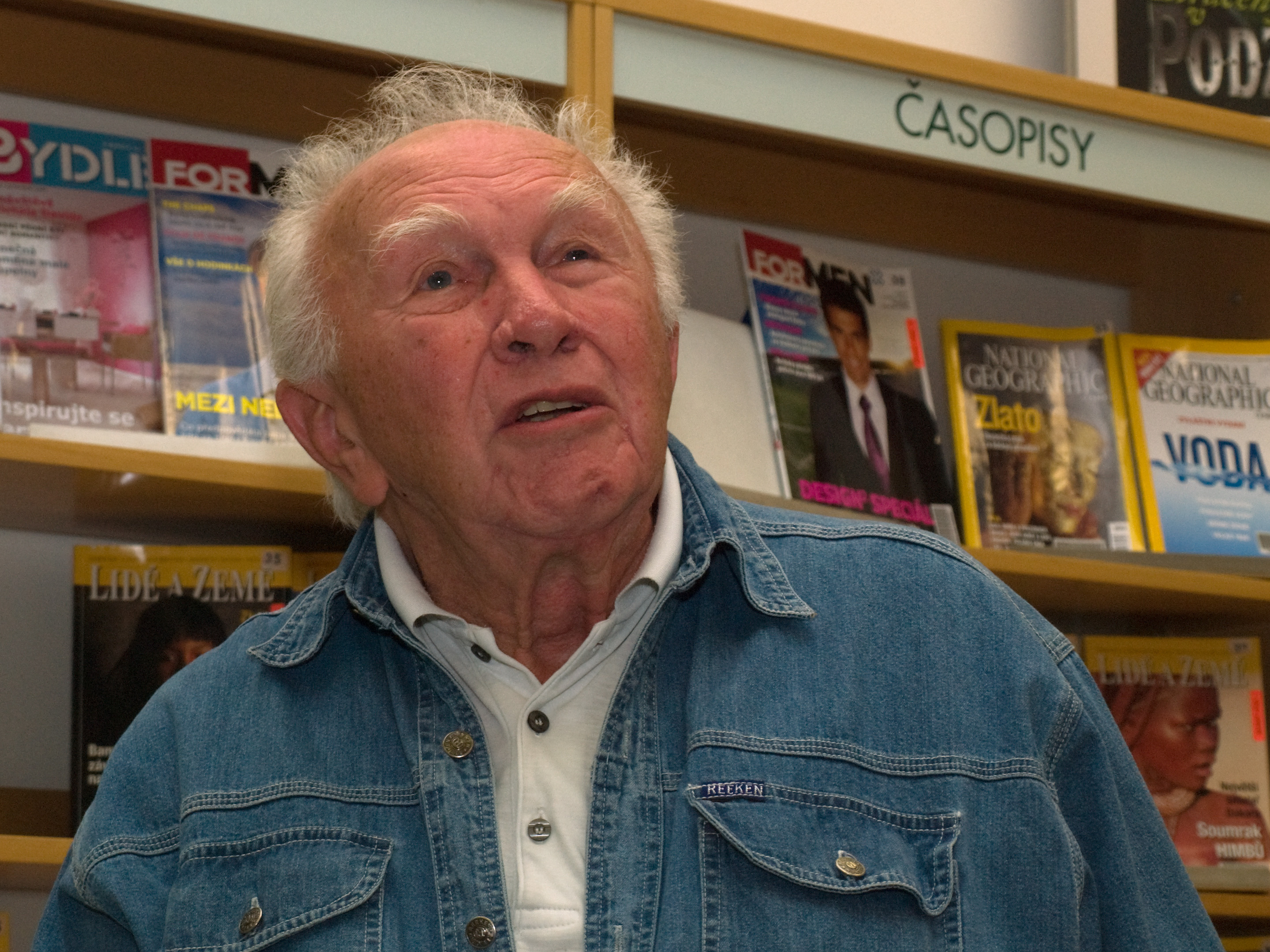
Zdeněk Mahler in 2010

Zdeněk Mahler (7 December 1928 – 17 March 2018) was a Czech writer, musicologist, pedagogue and screenwriter.

== Family ==
He was born in Batelov, to the family of ironmonger Karel Mahler (1901–1970) and Marie Mahlerová (1903–1982). He was a distant relative of the composer Gustav Mahler.

== Work ==
As a student of Faculty of Arts in Prague Mahler cooperated with Student magazines and also with Československý rozhlas where he get regular job after finishing his studies. Since 1960 he worked as a freelance writer. He published several books, such as Search for golden age (1965, translated to English in 1966) and biographies of famous persons, such as Tomáš Garrigue Masaryk, Antonín Dvořák, or Ema Destinová.

As a screenwriter Mahler contributed to the creation of several successful films, such as Nebeští jezdci (1968), Den sedmý, osmá noc (1969), The Divine Emma (1979), Concert at the End of Summer (1980), Amadeus (1984), Goya's Ghosts (2007), Lidice (2011) and many other films or TV documentaries.
