= Antonín Dvořák Museum =

Museum in Prague dedicated to composer Antonín Dvořák

- Muzeum Antonína Dvořáka
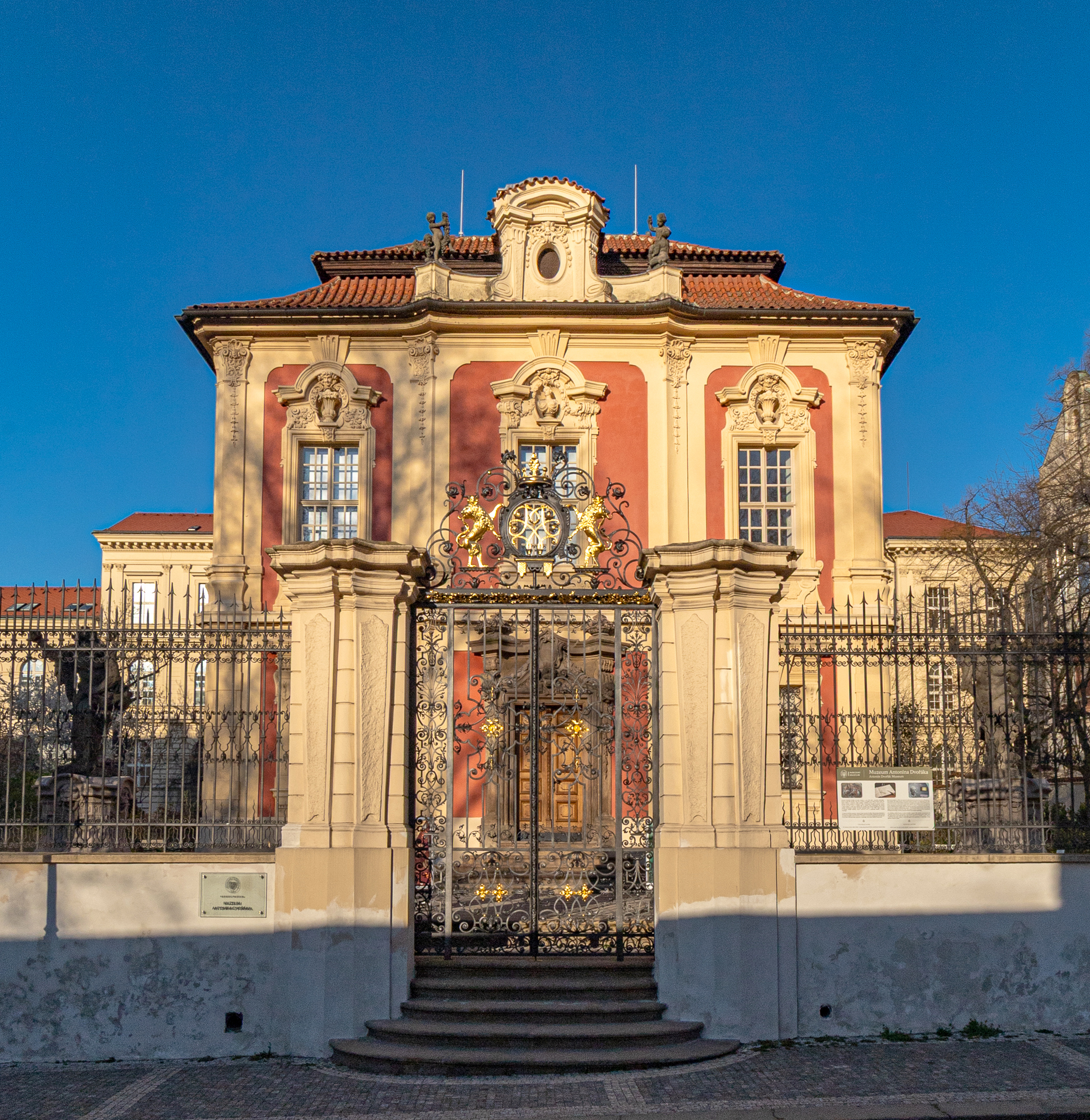
- Dvořák Museum
- Interactive fullscreen map
- Established: 1932; 94 years ago
- Location: Ke Karlovu 462/20, Prague 1, Czech Republic, 120 00
- Coordinates: 50.0735103°N 14.4269023°E
- Website: https://www.nm.cz/en/visit-us/buildings/antonin-dvorak-museum

The Antonín Dvořák Museum (Czech: Muzeum Antonína Dvořáka) is a museum in Prague in the Czech Republic dedicated to the Czech composer Antonín Dvořák.

== Description ==
The Antonín Dvořák Museum is part of the Czech Museum of Music which in turn is part of the National Museum. Since 1932, the museum has been housed in a Baroque style building which was designed by the architect Kilian Ignaz Dientzenhofer at the beginning of the 18th century, even though the house itself has no particular link with the Dvořák. It is situated in the north part of the New Town.

The museum displays photographs, newspaper cuttings, programmes and personal objects relating to the composer, including his viola and his piano. The building houses a unique collection of his manuscripts and correspondence, thus providing an important centre for research into Antonín Dvořák. Concerts are held there regularly, as well as seminars, lectures, and exhibitions.

In May 2023, a selected part of the collection of the National Museum–Antonín Dvořák Museum was registered under the name Antonín Dvořák Archive in the UNESCO Memory of the World Programme Register which safeguards the most important documentary heritage of humanity. Following the addition of the Leoš Janáček Archive in 2018, this marks the second instance of a collection from a Czech music composer being included on this prestigious list. An archive containing Dvořák's musical manuscripts, letters, personal documents, non-musical manuscripts, his personal library, iconographic documents, first editions of Dvořák's compositions, printed documentation, diplomas and honorary memberships has been entered into the Register. A total of 3,500 units were part of the nomination. However, the collection of the Antonín Dvořák Museum contains significantly more objects. As of 2023, the museum oversees a compilation of approximately 9,000 items within its collection.

The museum organizes an annual ceremony on the eve of the day of his death (1 May) at his grave in the Vyšehrad Cemetery just south of the New Town district. There is also a matinee celebration on his birthday at his birthplace in Nelahozeves. The museum also takes care of the village house of his son-in-law, Josef Suk.

There are also commemorative centres connected with Dvořák at other locations: there is a permanent exhibition at his country estate in Vysoká near Příbram, one in Zlonice and a memorial hall in Sychrov Castle.

== See also ==
- List of music museums
