= Eliška Pešková =

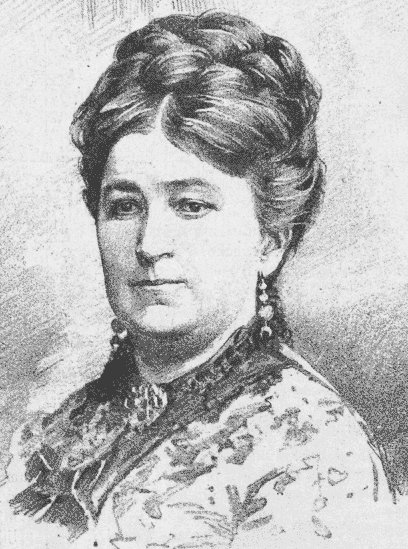
Portrait of Pešková by Jan Vilímek

Eliška Pešková (1 July 1833 in Prague – 23 May 1895 in Prague) was a Czech actress and playwright. She published about 50 plays, many of which were translated to other languages. She belonged to the leading stage actors of her time and many of the next generation Czech actors were influenced by her. She is most remembered for her roles as heroines in romantic drama. She was married to the dramatist Pavel Švanda ze Semčic.
