= A Summer's Tale (Suk) =

A Summer's Tale (Czech: Pohádka léta), Op. 29 is a tone poem for large orchestra by Josef Suk.

It is scored for a large orchestra of piccolo, 2 flutes, 2 oboes, 2 cors anglais, 2 clarinets, bass clarinet, 2 bassoons, contrabassoon, 6 horns, 3 trumpets, 3 trombones, tuba, timpani, cymbals, tam-tam, bass drum, piano, 2 harps, celesta, organ (ad lib) and strings.

The work was composed between 1907 and 1909 and was premiered in Prague on 26 January 1909, by the Czech Philharmonic conducted by the dedicatee Karel Kovařovic. It was initially coolly received—–several critics charged it with being impressionistic.

== Structure and character ==
There are five movements:

1. Voices of Life and Consolation
2. Midday
3. Blind Musicians
4. In the Power of Phantoms
5. Night

A performance typically takes one hour.

Rob Cowan has described the work as Scriabinesque and found in it a foreshadowing of Shostakovich's orchestration.
