= Asrael Symphony =

Joseph Suk's funeral symphony

Symphony No. 2
- Asrael
- by Josef Suk
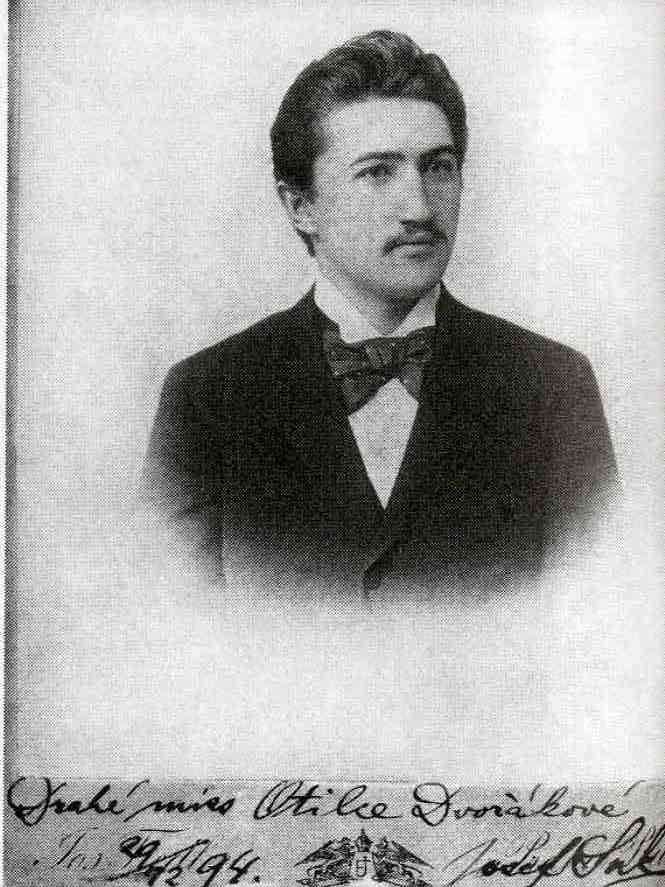
- Portrait of Suk with dedication: "To Dear Miss Otilka Dvořáková", 1894
- Key: C minor
- Opus: 27
- Composed: 1905–06
- Dedication: "to the exalted memory of Dvořák and Otilie"
- Duration: about one hour
- Movements: five

Premiere
- Date: 3 February 1907
- Location: Prague National Theatre
- Conductor: Karel Kovařovic

Czech composer Josef Suk's Second Symphony, named "Asrael" (Czech: „Asrael“, Symfonie pro velký orchestr c moll), was completed in 1906 following two deaths - first that of his father-in-law, in 1904, and then that of his wife, Otilie Dvořáková, daughter of his composition teacher, Antonín Dvořák. Inevitably mournful but also vital in nature, the five-movement, hour-long work is cast in C minor and scored in Straussian vein for large orchestra. It was published as Opus 27.

== Background ==
Suk began to compose his funeral symphony at the beginning of 1905, about eight months after Dvořák's death. The composition was titled after Asrael (Azrael), known as the angel of death in the Old Testament and as the Islamic carrier of souls after death. The work is in five movements. Suk completed the sketches of three movements less than a half year later. On 6 July 1905, while Suk was in the middle of the work, his wife Otilie died. Although the composition was to be also a celebration of Dvořák's life and work, the desolated composer rejected the optimistic tone of the rest of the work. Suk himself recalled:

The fearsome Angel of Death struck with his scythe a second time. Such a misfortune either destroys a man or brings to the surface all the powers dormant in him. Music saved me and after a year I began the second part of the symphony, beginning with an adagio, a tender portrait of Otilka.

Suk completed the score on 4 October 1906. He dedicated the work "to the exalted memory of Dvořák and Otilie", in particular the last two movements to Otilie.

The symphony was premièred on 3 February 1907 at the Prague National Theatre, conducted by Karel Kovařovic. Karel Hoffmann and Jiří Herold, members of the Czech Quartet, attended the premiere as the concertmasters of the orchestra of the National Theatre.

== Structure ==
The composition is in five movements:

1. Andante sostenuto
2. Andante
3. Vivace
4. Adagio – a portrait of Suk's wife
5. Adagio e maestoso

The influence of Dvořák's composing style, apparent in Suk's previous work, is not noticeable in this composition, according to Vysloužil, who writes that Suk develops his musical language rather toward modern polyphonic and harmonic techniques. Suk included several music quotations in tribute to his father-in-law and wife, including quotes from Dvořák's Requiem and opera Rusalka.

== Instrumentation ==
The symphony is scored for piccolo, 2 flutes, 2 oboes, cor anglais, 2 clarinets in B♭ and A (both doubling E♭ clarinet), bass clarinet, 2 bassoons, contrabassoon, 6 horns (horns V and VI ad lib), 3 trumpets in C, 3 trombones, tuba, timpani, triangle, cymbals, bass drum, harp, and strings.

== Recordings ==
- 1952 - Czech Philharmonic Orchestra, Talich, Supraphon
- 1967 - Czech Philharmonic Orchestra, Ančerl, Supraphon (2022)
- 1967 - Südwestfunkorchester Baden-Baden, Ančerl, SWR Classic (2018)
- 1968 - Brno Philharmonic Orchestra, Waldhans, Orchestral Concert (2009)
- 1981 - Bayerisches Rundfunk Sinfonieorchester, Kubelik, Panton
- 1985 - Czech Philharmonic Orchestra, Neumann, Supraphon
- 1990 - Royal Liverpool Philharmonic Orchestra, Pešek, Virgin
- 1992 - Czech Philharmonic Orchestra, Bělohlávek, Chandos
- 1993 - URSS State Symphony Orchestra, Svetlanov, Russian Disc
- 1999 - Orchestre Philharmonique De Montpellier, Schneider, Actes Sud
- 2001 - Prague Radio Symphony Orchestra, Valek, Praga Digital
- 2002 - Orchester Der Komischen Oper Berlin, Petrenko, CPO
- 2007 - Czech Philharmonic Orchestra, Mackerras, Supraphon
- 2009 - Malaysian Symphony Orchestra, Flor, BIS
- 2009 - Helsinki Philharmonic Orchestra, Ashkenazy, Ondine
- 2009 - National Orchestra Of Belgium, Weller, Fuga Libera
- 2012 - BBC Symphony Orchestra, Bělohlávek, Supraphon
- 2016 - Essen Philharmonic Orchestra, Netopil, Oehms Classics
- 2019 - Czech Philharmonic Orchestra, Bělohlávek, Decca
- 2020 - Bayerisches Rundfunk Sinfonieorchester, Hrůša, BR-Klassik
