= Julius Zeyer =

Czech writer (1841–1901)

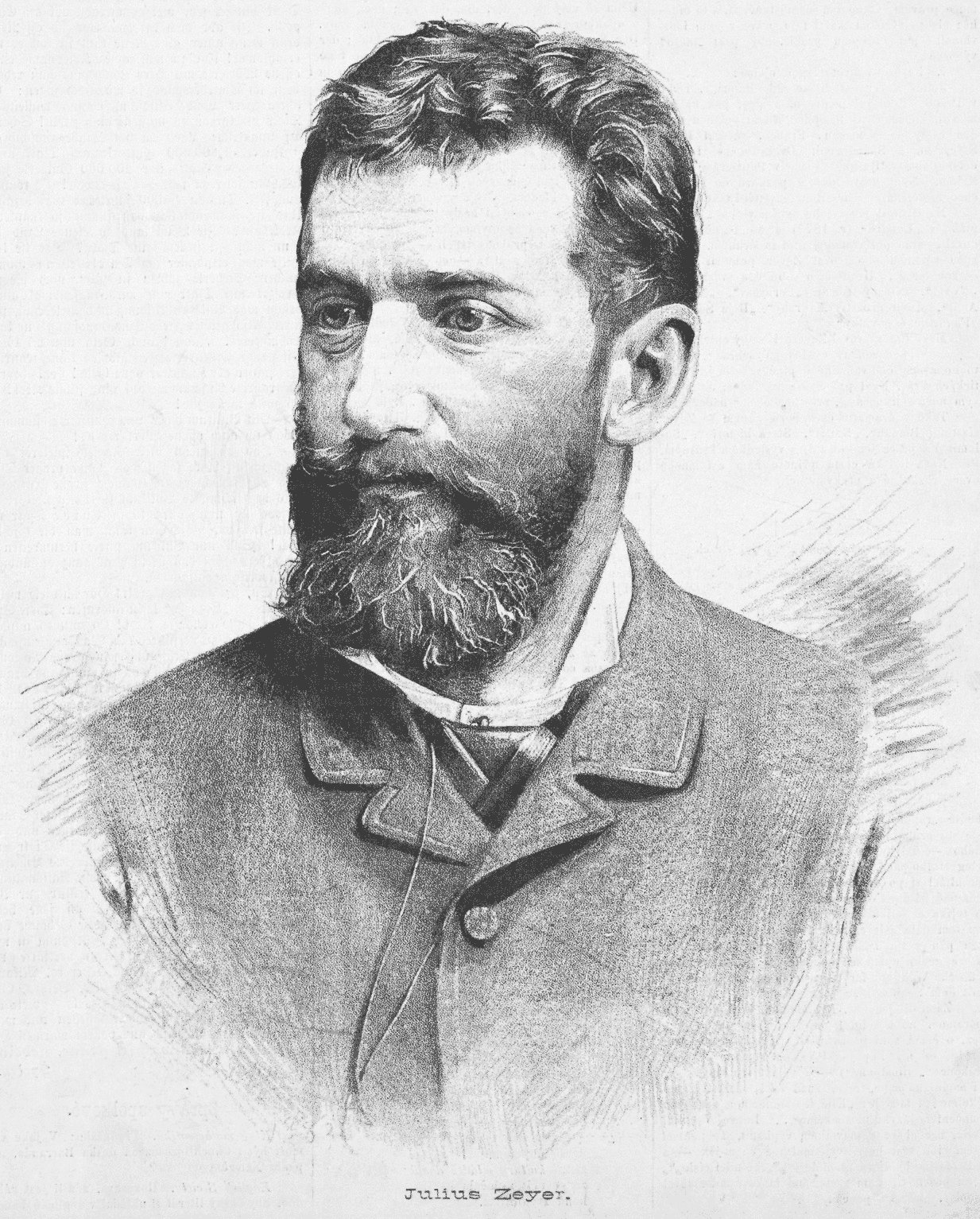
- Portrait of Zeyer by Jan Vilímek
- Born: 26 April 1841; Prague, Bohemia, Austrian Empire
- Died: 29 January 1901 (aged 59); Prague, Bohemia, Austria-Hungary
- Resting place: Slavín, Vyšehrad Cemetery
- Occupations: Writer, poet
- Writing career
- Notable works: Fantastické povídky Ondřej Černyšev; Román o věrném přátelství Amise a Amila; Tři legendy o krucifixu Radúz a Mahulena; Dům U tonoucí hvězdy Večer u Idalie; Jan Maria Plojhar

Julius Zeyer (26 April 1841 – 29 January 1901) was a Czech prose writer, poet and playwright.

== Personal life ==
Zeyer was born on 26 April 1841 in Prague. His mother, Elisabeth Eleonora (née Weisseles), came from a German Jewish-turned-Catholic family, and his father, Jan Zeyer, was a carpenter and timber merchant with relations to French (Alsatian) nobility. He was taught to speak Czech by his nanny. Growing up, he was expected to take over the family's factory but decided to study carpentering instead. All of his attempts at graduation from high school or university were unsuccessful. He spent a significant portion of his life travelling across Europe and the East. In around 1877, he moved to Vodňany, where he spent over a decade focusing on his literary work. His last years were spent living in Prague.

== Works ==
Zeyer's prose and poems convey a sense of restlessness, nostalgia, mysticism, and gloominess, and generally feature tragic endings. He combined European and Eastern mythologies with themes particular to Czech society and history, and, similarly to the Decadents, often employed a blend of religious and erotic imagery. He was associated with the "Lumír" school, a circle of writers grouped around a magazine of the same name who were influenced by western-European, primarily French, literary currents.

Zeyer's epics, Vyšehrad (1880) and Karolinská epopej (1896), among others, draw from Czech and French legends respectively, and put bygone glory in contrast with Zeyer's bleak present times. He was inspired by Czech, Russian, Irish, and French history, as well as Scandinavian myths. His novels generally follow characters seeking to realize their romanticized ideas of life, many of who only find peace in death. His semi-autobiographical novel Jan Maria Plojhar (1891) deals with the tragic nature of being an artist. His collection of three short stories, “Tři legendy o krucifixu” (1895), builds upon the story of Christ's crucifixion and explores themes of Czech Nationalism and the value of art. The first story, “Inultus”, explores the idea of an artist driven mad by her work. It follows an Italian sculptor as she attempts to create a realistic depiction of the crucifixion, eventually murdering her model, the titular character, in a fit of creative insanity.

Plot-wise, Zeyer's dramatic works follow a similar pattern.

Josef Suk composed his Pohádka based on Zeyer's play Radúz and Mahulena. Leoš Janáček used his theater play about a Czech mythical heroine Šárka as a libretto for his opera.

== Gallery ==
Zeyer's study and library, photo by Jan Štenc

Zeyer's reception room, photo by Jan Štenc

Zeyer's bedroom, photo by Jan Štenc
