= Křečovice =

- Municipality
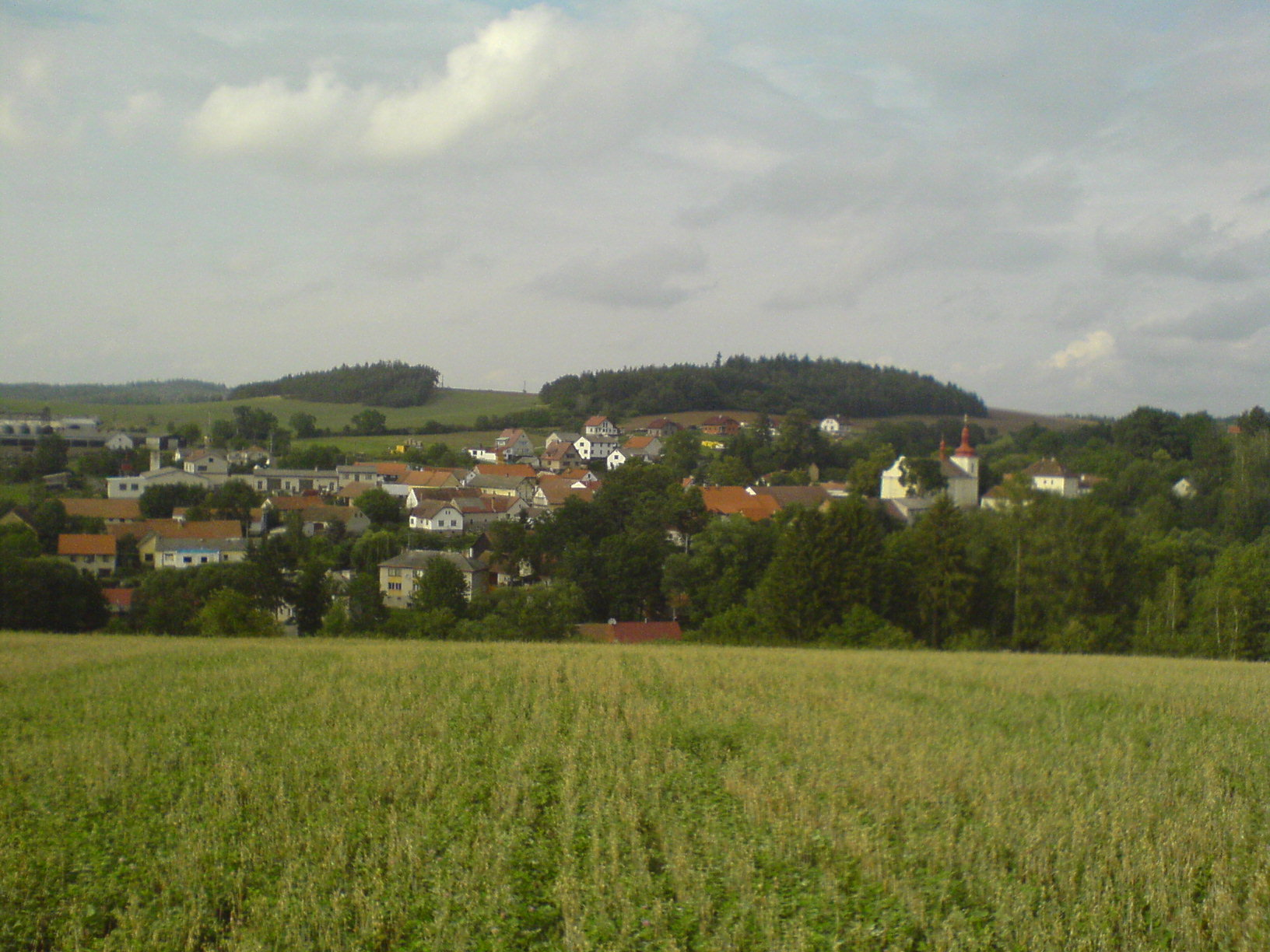
- View from the southwest

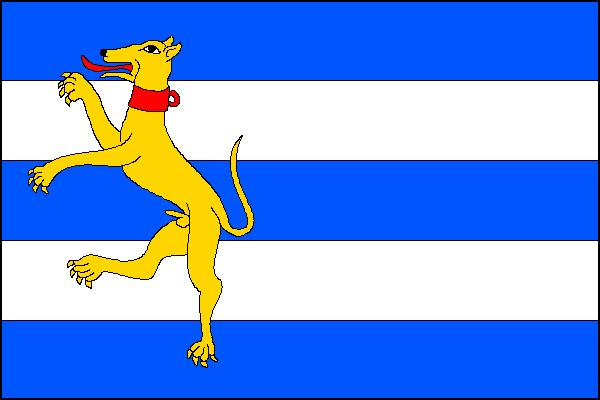
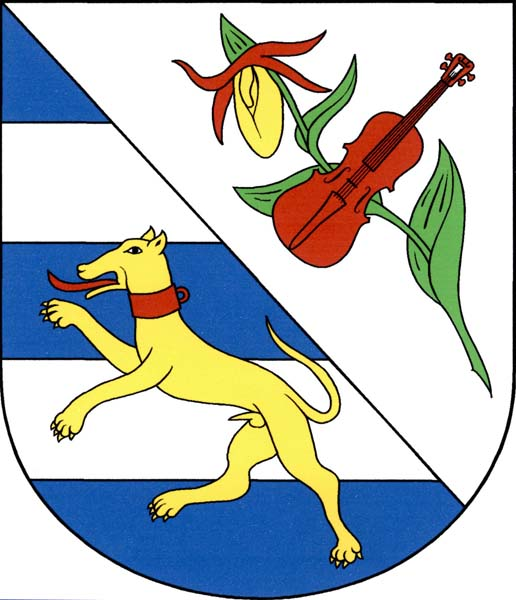
- Flag Coat of arms

- Location in the Czech Republic
- Coordinates: 49°43′17″N 14°28′32″E
- Country: Czech Republic
- Region: Central Bohemian
- District: Benešov
- First mentioned: 1350

Area
  - Total: 31.87 km^{2} (12.31 sq mi)
- Elevation: 365 m (1,198 ft)

Population (2026-01-01)
  - Total: 811
  - Density: 25.4/km^{2} (65.9/sq mi)
- Time zone: UTC+1 (CET)
  - Summer (DST): UTC+2 (CEST)
- Postal code: 257 56
- Website: www.obec-krecovice.cz

Křečovice is a municipality and village in Benešov District in the Central Bohemian Region of the Czech Republic. It has about 800 inhabitants.

== Administrative division ==
Křečovice consists of 14 municipal parts (in brackets population according to the 2021 census):

- Křečovice (307)
- Brdečný (11)
- Hodětice (19)
- Hořetice (85)
- Hůrka (24)
- Krchleby (71)
- Lhotka (2)
- Nahoruby (105)
- Poličany (33)
- Skrýšov (17)
- Strážovice (43)
- Vlkonice (98)
- Zhorný (16)
- Živohošť (31)

== Etymology ==
The name Křečovice is derived from the personal name Křeč, meaning "the village of Křeč's people".

== Geography ==
Křečovice is located about 16 kilometres (10 mi) southwest of Benešov and 33 km (21 mi) south of Prague. It lies in the Benešov Uplands. The highest point is the hill Svinný at 502 m (1,647 ft) above sea level. The stream Křečovický potok flows through the village of Křečovice. The stream Vlkonický potok flows across the municipality and supplies a system of fishponds there. The Vltava and Mastník rivers (respectively the Slapy Reservoir, which is built on them) form the western municipal border.

== History ==
The first written mention of Křečovice is from 1350.

== Demographics ==
Historical population

Year	Pop.	±%
1869	2,258	—
1880	2,210	−2.1%
1890	2,186	−1.1%
1900	1,999	−8.6%
1910	1,931	−3.4%

Year	Pop.	±%
1921	1,843	−4.6%
1930	1,716	−6.9%
1950	1,203	−29.9%
1961	1,091	−9.3%
1970	941	−13.7%

Year	Pop.	±%
1980	849	−9.8%
1991	752	−11.4%
2001	711	−5.5%
2011	724	+1.8%
2021	862	+19.1%

Source: Censuses

== Transport ==
There are no railways or major roads passing through the municipality.

== Sights ==
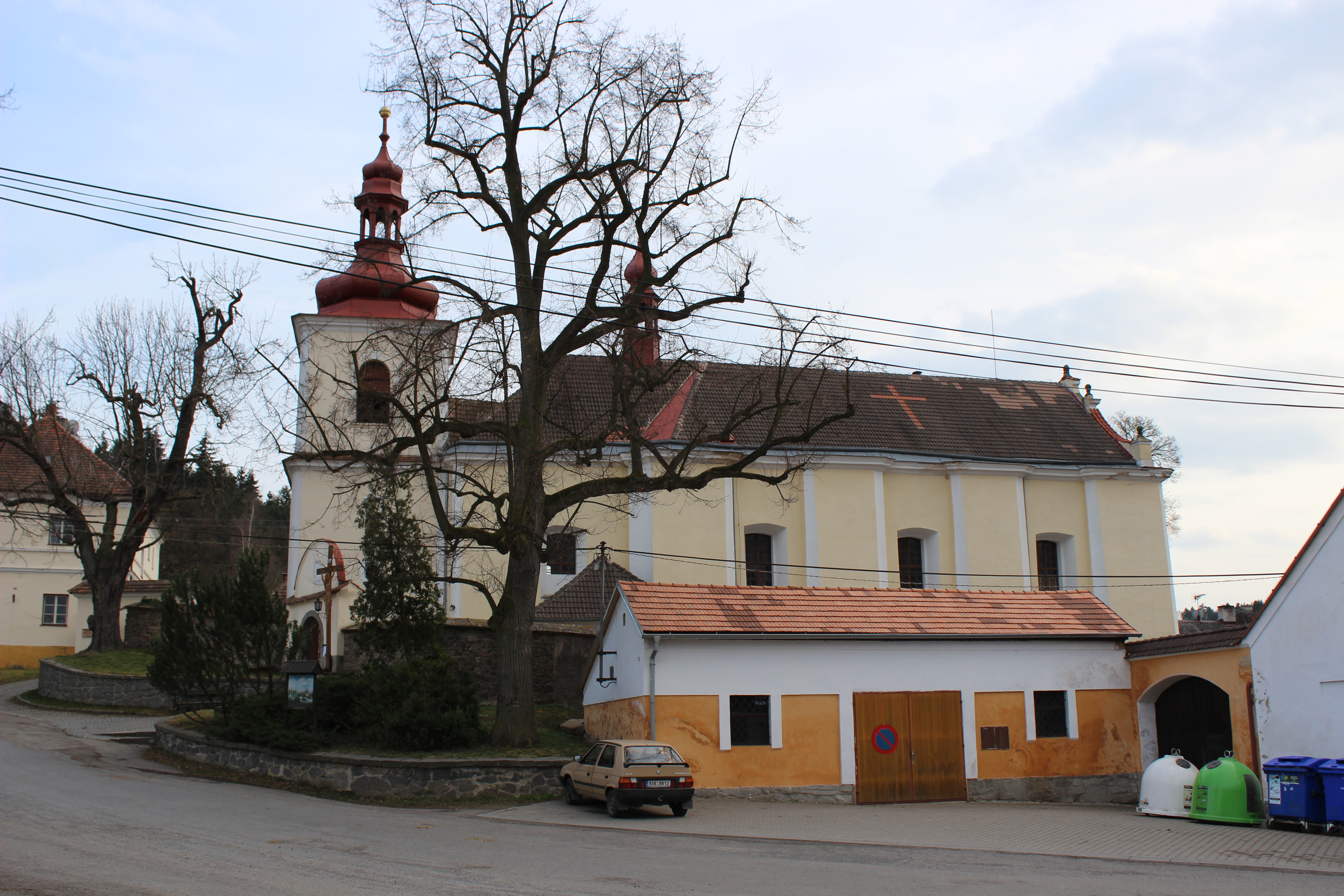
Church of Saint Luke

The main landmark of Křečovice is the Church of Saint Luke. It is a cemetery church, built in the Baroque style in the mid-18th century. Composer Josef Suk, who is the most famous native of Křečovice, is buried here.

The home of the composer Josef Suk is now the Josef Suk Memorial.

The Church of Saints Peter and Paul is located in Hodětice. Its core dates from the turn of the 13th and 14th centuries. Its present appearance is the result of Baroque modifications.

== In popular culture ==
The comedy film My Sweet Little Village was filmed in Křečovice in 1984–1985.

== Notable people ==
- Josef Suk (1874–1935), composer
