= Serenade for Strings (Suk) =

Composition by Josef Suk

Josef Suk's Serenade for Strings in E♭ major, Op. 6, was composed in 1892.

While Suk was studying under Antonín Dvořák at the Prague Conservatory, Dvořák noticed a melancholy strain in much of Suk's music, and recommended he try writing some lighter and more cheerful music. Based on Dvořák's suggestion, Suk produced the Serenade for Strings.

Two movements were publicly conducted by Suk in late 1893 in Tábor. The first complete performance was on 25 February 1895, at the Prague Conservatory, conducted by Antonín Bennewitz, Suk's violin teacher at the Conservatory.

The Serenade soon brought Suk considerable fame and Dvořák's longtime supporter, Johannes Brahms, endorsed its publication.

== Structure ==
The serenade comprises four movements:

1. Andante con moto
2. Allegro ma non troppo e grazioso
3. Adagio
4. Allegro giocoso, ma non troppo presto
