= Radúz and Mahulena =

Radúz and Mahulena is an 1898 stage play by Czech novelist Julius Zeyer. It was made into a film in 1970, directed by Petr Weigl.

== Story ==
Zeyer's dramatic poem is a love story, combining classical fairy-tale motifs with mythological references. Radúz and Mahulena, from feuding kingdoms, fall in love, but have to face various challenges, including the sorcery of Queen Runa. As well as Slovak myths and fairy tales, the story also draws from the Indian drama Shakuntala by the poet Kalidasa.

== Film cast ==
- Directed by Petr Weigl.
- Magda Vašaryová as Mahulena
- Jan Tříska as Radúz
- Jiří Adamíra as Stojmír
- Vladimír Ráž as Radovíd
- Jaroslava Adamová as Runa
- Nada Urbánková as Prija
- Jaroslava Obermaierová as Živa
- Dana Medřická as Nyola
- Václav Mareš as Pribina
- Vladimír Menšík as Vratko
- Marie Popelková as Maid of Honour
- Jiří Hospoda as Lover
- František Michálek as Herold
- Richard Záhorský as Sawyer
- Petr Svojtka as Singer
- Miroslav Kura as Dancer
- Ľubomír Paulovič as Prince
