= Josef Suk (composer) =

Czech composer and violinist (1874–1935)

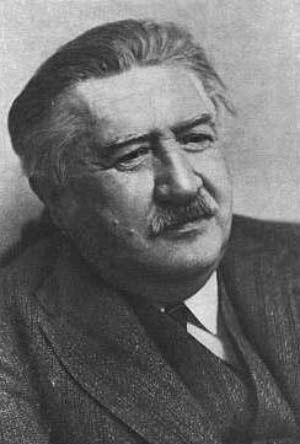
- Born: 4 January 1874; Křečovice, Bohemia, Austria-Hungary
- Died: 29 May 1935 (aged 61); Benešov, Czechoslovakia
- Occupations: Violinist, composer

Josef Suk (4 January 1874 – 29 May 1935) was a Czech composer and violinist. He studied under Antonín Dvořák, whose daughter he married. He was a silver medalist at the 1932 Summer Olympics.

== Biography ==
Josef Suk was born on 4 January 1874 in Křečovice, Bohemia, Austria-Hungary (now the Czech Republic) From a young age, he was deeply involved and well trained in music. He learned organ, violin, and piano from his father, Josef Suk Sr., and was trained further in violin by the Czech violinist Antonín Bennewitz. His theory studies were conducted with several other composers including Josef Bohuslav Foerster, Karel Knittl, and Karel Stecker. He later focused his writing on chamber works under the teachings of Hanuš Wihan. Despite extensive musical training, his musical skill was often said to be largely inherited. Though he continued his lessons with Wihan another year after the completion of his schooling, Suk's greatest inspiration came from another of his teachers, Czech composer Antonín Dvořák.

Known as one of Dvořák's favorite pupils, Suk also became personally close to his mentor. Underlying this was Dvořák's respect for Suk, reflected in Suk's 1898 marriage to Dvořák's daughter, Otilie, marking some of the happiest times in the composer's life and music. However, it concluded with tragedy. Over the span of 14 months around 1905, not only did Suk's mentor Dvořák die, but so did Otilie. These events inspired Suk's Asrael Symphony.

Medal record

Art competitions

Representing Czechoslovakia

Olympic Games
Silver medal – second place	1932 Los Angeles	Music

Owing to a shared heritage—and the coincidence of their dying within a few months of one another—Suk has been closely compared, in works and style, to fellow Czech composer Otakar Ostrčil. Suk, alongside Vitezslav Novak and Ostrčil, is considered one of the leading composers in Czech Modernism, with much shared influence among the three coming in turn from Dvořák. Eminent German figures such as composer Johannes Brahms and critic Eduard Hanslick recognised Suk's work during his time with the Czech Quartet. Over time, well known Austrian composers such as Gustav Mahler and Alban Berg also began to take notice of Suk and his work.

Although he wrote mostly instrumental music, Suk occasionally branched out into other genres. His time with the Czech Quartet, though performing successful concerts until his retirement, was not always met with public approval. Several anti-Dvořák campaigns came into prominence; criticism not only being directed at the quartet, but towards Suk specifically. The leftist critic Zdeněk Nejedlý accused the Czech Quartet of inappropriately playing concerts in the Czech lands during World War I. While these attacks diminished Suk's spirits, they did not hinder his work.

== Private life ==
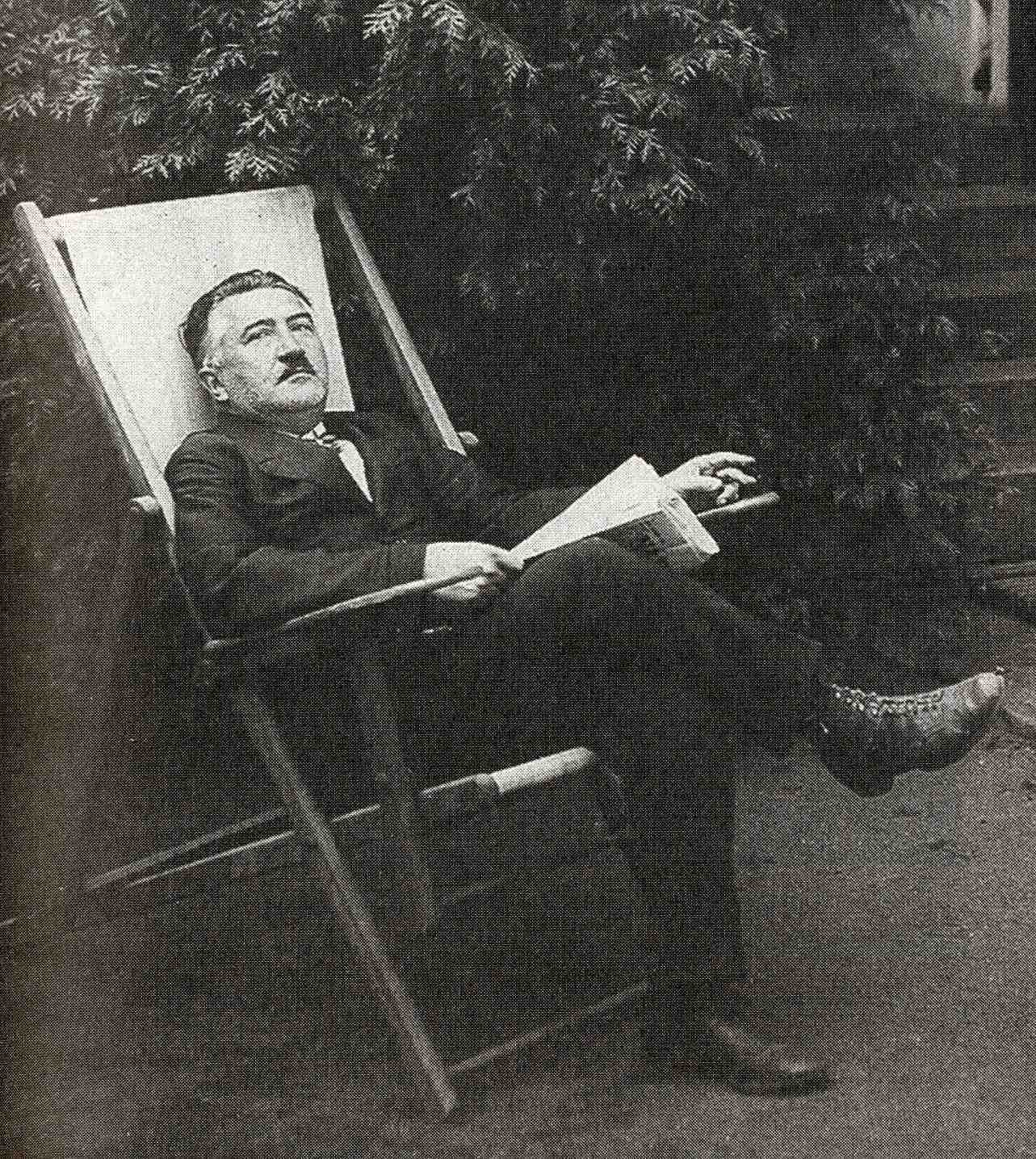
Josef Suk

Suk married Dvořák's daughter, Otilie Suková, a composer in her own right, in 1898. Otilie died of heart failure aged 27 in 1905, a year after her father. They had one child, a son also named Josef, in 1901. He was an engineer and established the Josef Suk Memorial as a museum, donating the house to the State in 1951. Josef Suk Jr. in turn was father of the acclaimed violinist Josef Suk, who died in 2011.

Suk retired in 1933, although he continued to be a valuable and inspirational public figure to the Czechs. Suk died on 29 May 1935 in Benešov, Czechoslovakia (now the Czech Republic).

== Musical style ==
Meditation on the Saint Wenceslas Chorale, Op. 35a
Performed by Musopen String Quartet

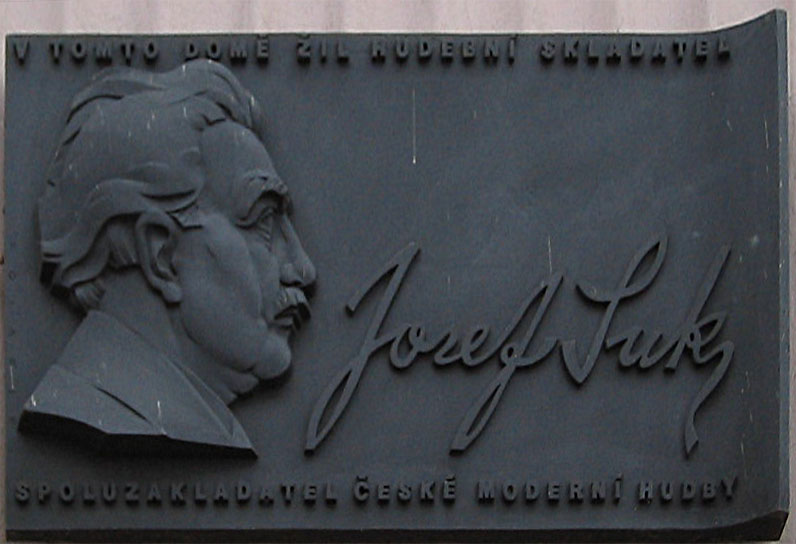
Memorial plaque

Suk's musical style started off with a heavy influence from his mentor, Dvořák, perhaps most notably in the well-known Serenade for Strings, Op. 6 (1892). The biggest change of Suk's style came after he reached a "dead end" in his early musical style (music played less of a role in Suk's life outside of his schooling), just before he began a stylistic shift during 1897–1905, perhaps realizing that the strong influence of Dvořák would limit his work. Morbidity was always a large factor in Suk's music. For instance, he wrote his own funeral march in 1889 and it appears significantly also in a major work, the "funeral symphony" Asrael, Op. 27. Ripening, a symphonic poem, was also a story of pain and questioning the value of life. Other works, however – such as the music he set to Julius Zeyer's drama Radúz a Mahulena – display his happiness, which he credited to his marriage with Otilie. Another of Suk's works, Pohádka (Fairy Tale), was drawn from his work with Radúz a Mahulena. The closest Suk came to opera is in his incidental music to the play Pod jabloní (Beneath the Apple Tree).

The majority of Suk's papers are kept in Prague. A new catalogue of Suk's works contains more manuscripts than any before it, some of them also containing sketches by Suk.

Suk said of himself: "I do not bow to anyone, except to my own conscience and to our noble Lady Music… and yet at the same time I know that thereby I serve my country, and praise the great people from the period of our wakening who taught us to love our country."

== Olympic medalist ==
The march V nový život (Into a New Life), op. 35, was originally written in 1920 as a symphonic march for the Sokol sports movement, but revised in 1931 with a text by poet Petr Křička (1884-1949, brother of composer Jaroslav Křička). After its first performance that year, the Czechoslovak Olympic Committee awarded it a silver medal in 1932 (the gold and bronze medals were not awarded). The piece was performed at the BBC Proms in 1943, and at the Last Night in 2012.
