= Cello Sonata (Strauss) =

Sonata for cello and piano composed by Richard Strauss

- by Richard Strauss
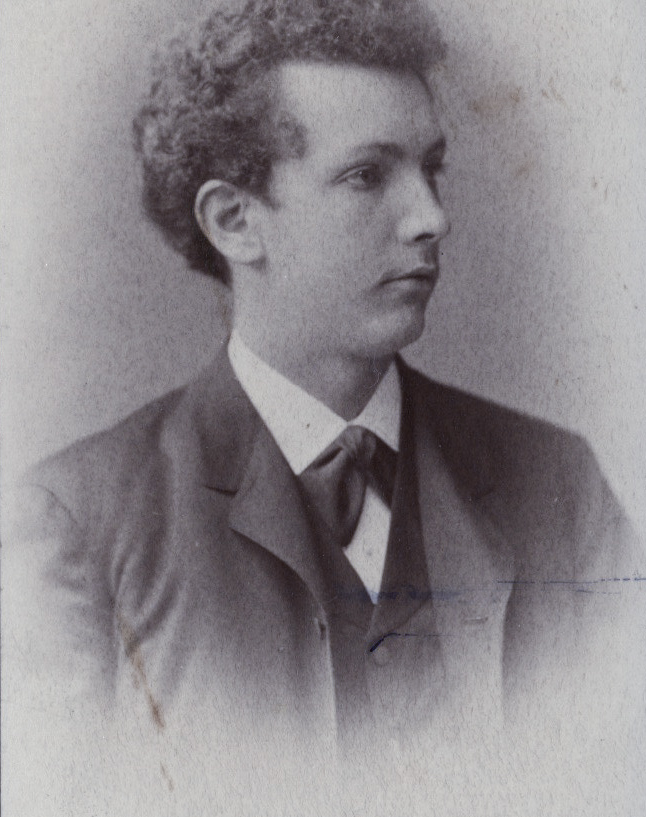
- The composer in 1886
- English: Sonata for Cello and Piano in F major
- Native name: Sonate in F dur für Violoncello und Pianoforte
- Key: F major
- Catalogue: TrV 115
- Opus: 6
- Composed: March 1883
- Dedication: Hans Wihan

Richard Strauss composed his Cello Sonata in F major, Op. 6, TrV 115, in 1883 when he was 19 years old. It was dedicated to the Czech cellist Hanuš Wihan, who gave the premiere in 1883. It rapidly became a standard part of the cello repertoire.

== Composition history ==
Strauss completed the first version of the Cello Sonata on 5 May 1881. His sister Johanna was a good friend of Dora Wihan, a talented pianist and wife of the cellist Hanuš Wihan (he was known by the first name Hans in Germany), who played in the Munich Court orchestra along with Richard's father Franz. "Through these relationships, Strauss came to know Wihan and his instrument's idiomatic possibilities". He composed and dedicated the sonata for "his dear friend" (Seinem lieben Freunde) Hans Wihan. On the first manuscript, he added a verse by Austrian poet Franz Grillparzer:

Music, the eloquent,
is at the same time silent.
Keeping quiet about the individual
She gives us the whole universe

In March 1883 he revised the sonata into its current form, notably replacing the original finale with a completely new one. The sonata is in the traditional three movements:

1. Allegro con brio
2. Andante ma non troppo
3. Finale – Allegro vivo

Norman Del Mar wrote that "...the influence of Mendelssohn is strongly marked. The opening of the sonata has a fine verve and Strauss wrote proudly home to his parents that the celebrated violinist Joseph Joachim had congratulated him". Strauss had met Joachim at an evening concert on 16 January at Berlin where they shared the stage: Strauss had accompanied Robert Hausmann in the Cello Sonata, and Joachim continued with the Beethoven Romance in G and Bach's Chaconne from the D minor Partita.

== Performances ==
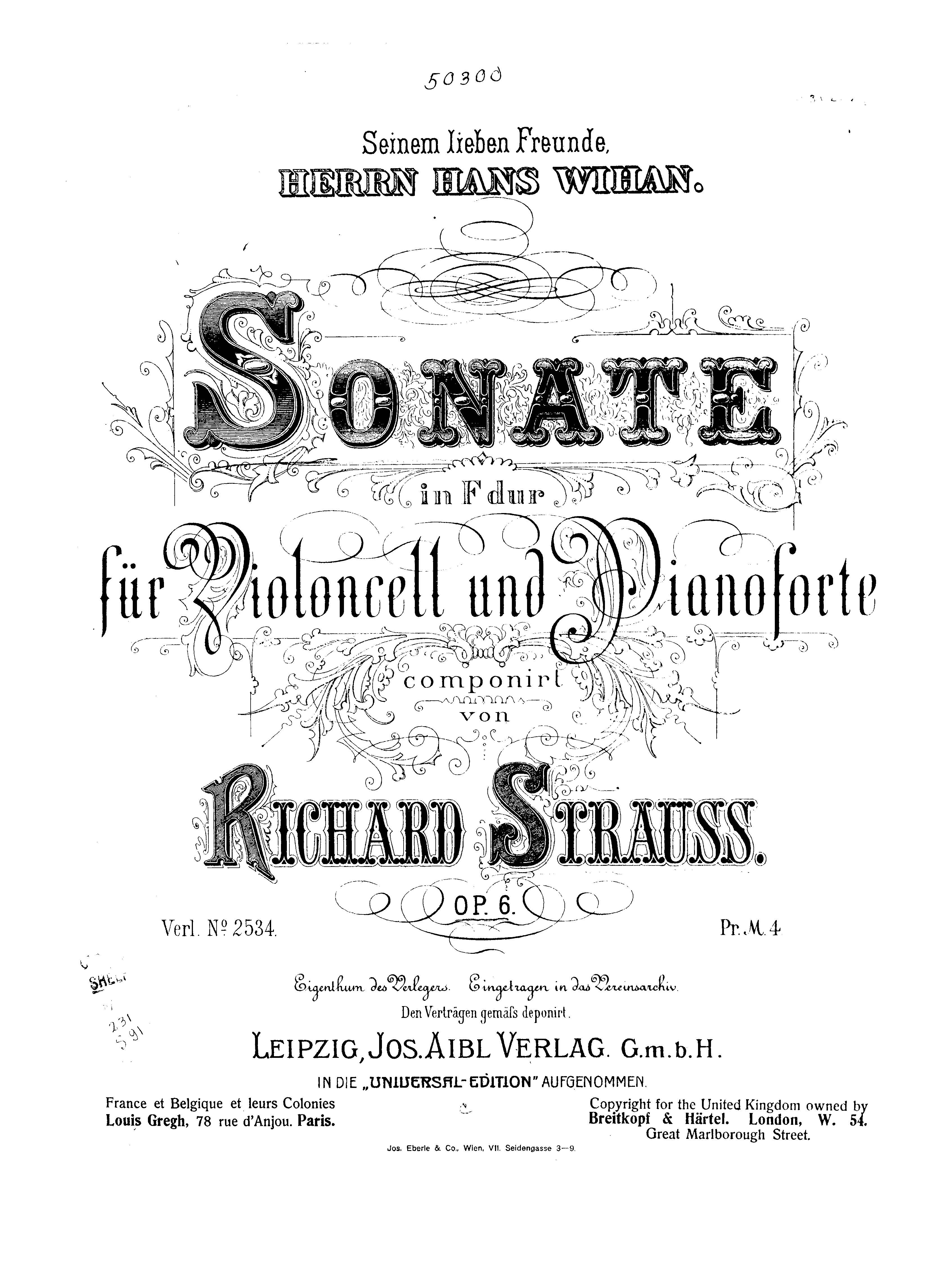
Title page from the original sheetmusic

The premiere was given on 6 December 1883 in Nuremberg, by Hans Wihan and pianist Hildergard von Koenigs. On 19 December of the same year, while visiting Dresden, Strauss accompanied the principal cellist of the Dresden Court Orchestra, Ferdinand Böckmann. Oscar Franz, a horn player in the orchestra, reported to Franz Strauss:

Your son's wonderful sonata had a magnificent reception and is indeed a splendid work, full of original feeling, and everything flows so wholesomely from it. I take the greatest pleasure in your son's success.

Willi Schuh notes that "Of all the works from this period of Strauss's creative life, the Cello Sonata is still the one that is heard most often", and that "This sonata quickly became one of Strauss's most frequently performed works". Strauss himself accompanied the sonata on several occasions later in his life: including concerts at Leipzig on 31 March 1890 (Alvin Schröder on Cello)), New York on 18 March 1904 (Leo Schulz) and Manchester (UK) on 21 December 1904 (Carl Fuchs).

== Romanze for cello and orchestra ==
About the same time as Strauss wrote the Sonata, he also wrote a single movement Romanze for cello and orchestra. Norman Del Mar wrote:

A further composition for the Cello, though this time with orchestral accompaniment, also belongs to this period, a most attractive Romanze which has unfortunately remained unpublished. It is a gentle 3/8 movement, similar in type to the slow movements of the Violin and Horn concertos, both of which precede by date of composition.

The piece was completed on 17 June 1883, and was performed a few times by Hans Wihan, who premiered it on 15 February 1884 at Baden-Baden and went on to perform it in Aachen, Freiburg, and elsewhere It was dedicated to Anton Ritter von Knözinger. The piece somehow came to be forgotten, but was eventually published by Schott in 1987. It was first performed in modern times by cellist Jan Vogler, with the Orchestra of the Dresden Semperoper conducted by Günter Neuhold on 12 May 1986. The orchestra is double woodwind, two horns and strings. The piece takes about 10 minutes to perform.

There is also an abridged (shortened) version of the Romanze for Cello with piano accompaniment, which Strauss dedicated to Ferdinand Böckmann (principal cellist in the Dresden Court Orchestra). This is about one third of the length "and also shows numerous deviations from the original orchestral version". Many copies of this version have survived, indicating its popularity at the time. Whether Wihan used a piano arrangement of the orchestral version or the abridged version "it is no longer possible to say". The abridged version was first performed in modern times by Peter Wöpke on cello accompanied by Wolfgang Sawallisch on 17 October 1985 in Munich.

== The Dora Wihan-Weis affair ==
Richard Strauss became close to Dora, who was four years older than him. Sister Johanna Strauss wrote of Dora, "She was like one of the family. Herr Wihan was insanely jealous over this pretty and already rather coquettish wife. I often witnessed scenes. When Richard was with us, we used to make music. She was very musical and an excellent piano player". The marriage ended in divorce after a few years. Hans left to become a Professor at the Prague Conservatory and going on to found the celebrated Bohemian Quartet and later worked with Antonín Dvořák on his Cello Concerto in B minor. Dora and Richard developed a deep understanding and whole-hearted liking, and "there can be no doubt that they were in love for some years". Dora kept a photograph of Richard (inscribed To his beloved and only one, R) on her piano until she died in 1938. They wrote many letters to each other, which she ordered be destroyed on her death. Strauss also destroyed her letters to him: possibly because of his jealous wife Pauline de Ahna whom he married in 1894. There was a lot of gossip in Munich, and when Richard moved to Meiningen his father warned him of the need to preserve a spotless reputation: "Don't forget how people here talked about you and Dora W." There is one surviving letter from Richard to Dora, written in 1889:

"The fact is, that your letter, putting off the prospect of seeing you again for the foreseeable future, has upset and distressed me deeply. God, what wooden expressions those are for what I really feel...Strauss the artist is doing very well! But may no happiness be complete?!"

In January 1911, they met again under difficult circumstances in Dresden. Dora was the co-repetiteur at the rehearsals for the premiere of Der Rosenkavalier. Strauss gave her a signed copy of the vocal score. Sister Johanna was delighted to meet her old friend, inviting her to dinner with the family. Wife "Pauline was furious and treated Dora like a rival. Richard, as always, took his wife's part, and there was no further contact between them". In his notebook, there is a cryptic entry on 9 March 1911 "Letter to Hanna (his sister, Johanna) concerning D.Wihan" (Brief an Hanna weg D.Wihan). On 31 January 1938 he made the entry "Dora Wihan-Weis deceased".

== Recordings ==
The first recording of the sonata was made by Raya Garbousova with pianist Erich Itor Kahn, issued as part of the Concert Hall Society Limited Edition Records in 1948-9 (reference C14, consisting of three 78 rpm records), which is not at present available. There is a recording from December 1953 at the Beethoven-Saal, Hanover with Ludwig Hoelscher and pianist Hans Richter-Haaser. Another historic recording was made on 28 September 1966, with cellist Gregor Piatigorsky and Leonard Pennario, at the Webster Hall, New York issued on RCA Victor. There are many recordings currently available, which include:

CD title and release date	Performers	Label and reference
Piatigorsky: Mendelssohn, Chopin, Strauss (2008)	Gregor Piatigorsky, Leonard Pennario	Testament SBT1419
Mstislav Rostropovich - The Complete EMI Recordings (2009)	Mstislav Rostropovich, Vasso Devetzi	EMI CLASSICS 17597
Strauss & Britten: Cello Sonatas (2006)	Yo-Yo Ma, Emanuel Ax	Sony 82876888042
*Mischa Maisky - Morgen (2009)	Mischa Maisky, Pavel Gililov	DG 4777465
Cello Sonatas: Strauss, Janáček, Pfitzner (2004)	Esther Nyffenegger, Gerard Wyss	Divox CDX252052
Myung-Wha Chung 40th Anniversary (2010)	Myung-Wha Chung, Dae-Jin Kim	Sony S70435C
*The Romantic Cello (2011)	Emmanuelle Bertrand, Pascal Amoyel	Harmonia Mundi Initiales HMX2908452/53
*Richard Strauss: Works for Cello (2012)	Jan Vogler, Louis Lortie	Sony 88697404182
*Lorin Maazel Conducts R. Strauss (2014)	Steven Isserlis, Stephen Hough	RCA Classical Masters 88843015232
de Saram in Concert Vol.2 Brahms-Strauss (2014)	Rohan de Saram, Druvi de Saram	Claudio CB60052
Strauss & Rachmaninoff Cello Sonatas (2014)	Niklas Schmidt, John Chen	Fontenay Classics FCI008
Deutsche Grammophon: The Mono Era (2016)	Ludwig Hoelscher, Hans Richter-Haaser	DG 4795516
FUGATO (2018)	Estelle Revas, François Killian	Solo Musica SM 307

The Romanze has been recorded many times with orchestra or piano since it was published in 1987/8, and is often released alongside the Cello sonata. The recordings with an asterisk * before the titles above include the Romanze. There are some recordings that only have the Romanze with orchestral accompaniment, including:

CD title and release date	Performers - (Cello, conductor, orchestra)	Label and reference
Strauss - Orchestral Works (2003)	Thomas Grossenbacher, David Zinman, Tonhalle Orchestra	Arte Nova: 74321984952
Strauss, R: Symphony No. 2, Op. 12, etc.(2004)	Raphael Wallfisch, Neeme Järvi, Royal Scottish National Orchestra	Chandos: CHAN10236X
Shostakovich: Cello Concertos (2001)	Arto Noras, Ari Rasilainen, Norwegian Radio Orchestra	Apex: 0927406042
Strauss: Don Quixote and Romanze for Cello (2000)	Alexander Rudin, Gerhard Markson, Ireland National Symphony Orchestra	Naxos: 8554175
