= Hanuš Wihan =

Czech cellist

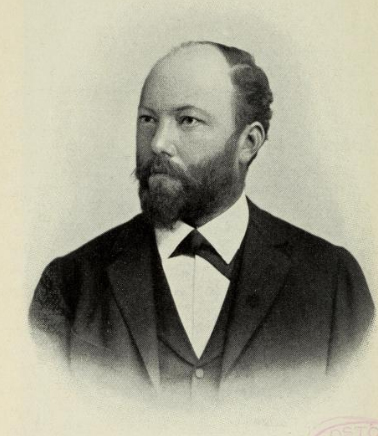

Hanuš Wihan (5 June 1855 – 1 May 1920) was a Czech cellist. Some considered him the greatest of his time. He was strongly associated with the works of Antonín Dvořák, whose Cello Concerto in B minor, Rondo in G minor, and the short piece Silent Woods were all dedicated to him. He was the founder and later cellist of the Czech String Quartet, which was world-famous throughout its 40-year existence.

== Early life ==
Hanuš Wihan was born in Police nad Metují and studied with František Hegenbarth (1881–1887) at the Prague Conservatory from the age of 13, finishing his studies with Karl Davydov at the St. Petersburg Conservatory. He became a teacher at the Mozarteum in Salzburg at 18. He joined the private orchestra of a Russian patron in Nice and Lugano, then went to Benjamin Bilse’s orchestra in Berlin (the forerunner of the Berlin Philharmonic) for a year, where the leader was his compatriot Karel Halíř; then to Prince Schwarzenburg's orchestra in Sondershausen, where he became a close friend of Franz Liszt, and to the court orchestra in Munich, in which Franz Strauss was the first horn. He remained in Munich for eight years, joining the circles of Hans von Bülow, Richard Wagner (who hired him to play at the Bayreuth Festival) and Franz Strauss's son Richard. Richard Strauss dedicated his String Quartet in A, Op. 2 to Wihan and the other members of the Walter String Quartet (Benno Walter, Michael Steiger and Anton Thoms). who had given it its first performance. Strauss also dedicated to Wihan his Cello Sonata in F, Op. 6 (which Wihan premiered in Nuremberg on 8 December 1883). He also wrote the Romance for Cello and Orchestra for Wihan, but did not dedicate it to him; Wihan premiered it on 15 February 1884 in Baden-Baden.

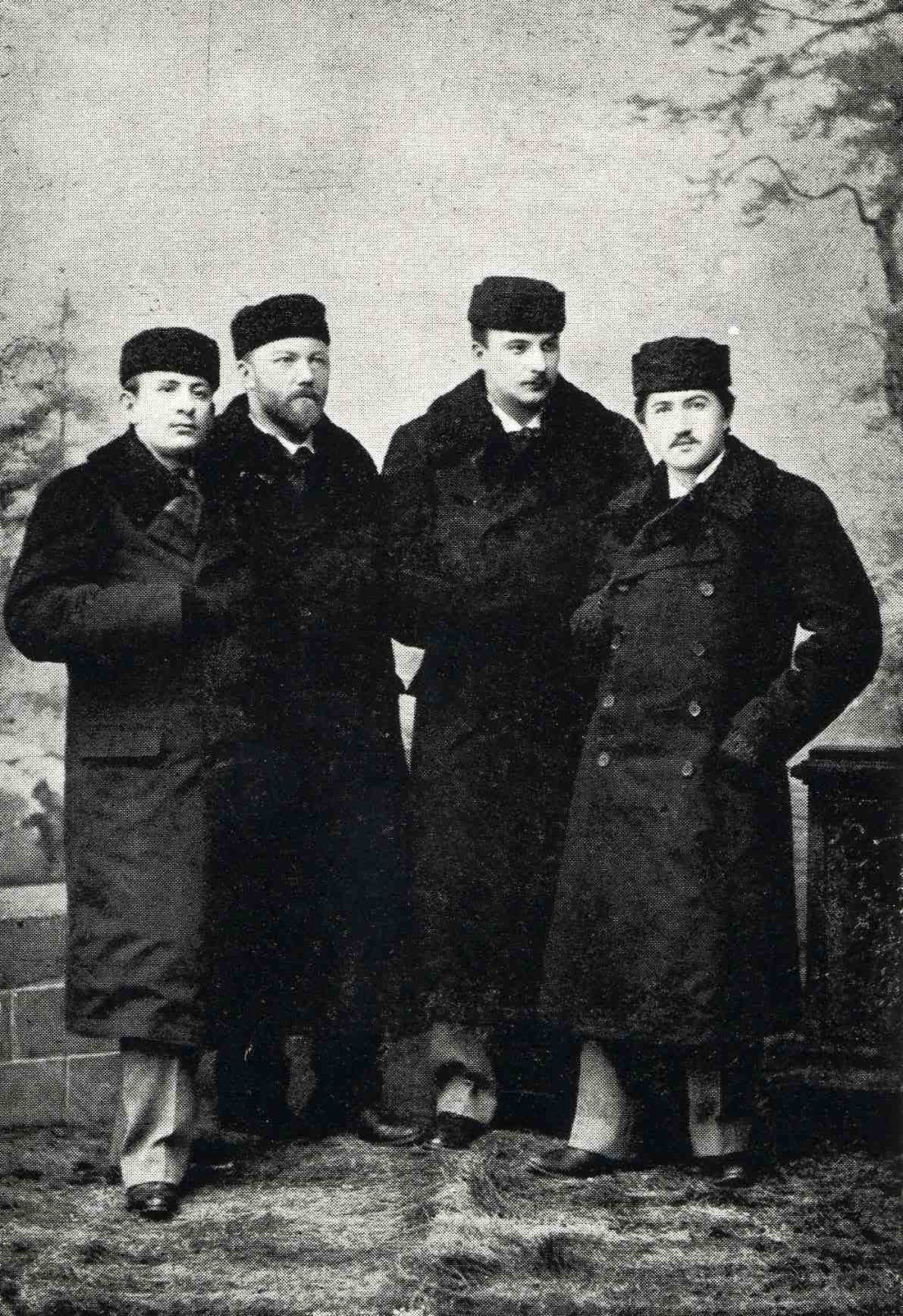
Members of the Czech String Quartet; the members, from left to right, are Karel Hoffmann, Hanuš Wihan, Oskar Nedbal and Josef Suk.

By this time Hanuš Wihan was married to Dora (née Weis), a pianist from Dresden. Dora fell in love with Richard Strauss, who was five years younger than she. There is no evidence that the affair was consummated or was ever going to be, but Wihan was very jealous by nature and it led to Dora's and Hanuš's marriage breaking up. He then returned to his alma mater in Prague.

== Work ==
He had a highly successful career as a virtuoso and teacher, succeeding his teacher Hegenbarth in 1888, and toured widely as a soloist and a chamber musician, particularly in Russia from 1894. Tchaikovsky heard him perform in a concert in Prague in 1888 and offered to help arrange some appearances in Russia. He also frequently sought advice from Karl Davydov, and maintained regular correspondence with both Davydov and Tchaikovsky.

In 1891 Hanuš Wihan formed the Bohemian String Quartet with violinists Karel Hoffmann and Josef Suk, and violist Oskar Nedbal – all pupils of Antonín Bennewitz – and his own cello pupil Otakar Berger. He did not play with them at first, but instilled in them his own ideas and managed their appearances. In 1892 the name Czech String Quartet was adopted. Wihan filled the void when Otakar Berger fell ill in 1893 and joined the ensemble permanently after Berger's death in 1897. The Quartet toured in many European countries, became strongly associated with Bedřich Smetana's String Quartet No. 1 in E minor From My Life, and Sergei Taneyev in Russia was particularly impressed, played with them on various occasions, and dedicated his 4th String Quartet to them.

In 1892 Wihan went on a five-month tour of Czech towns with Antonín Dvořák and Ferdinand Lachner, during which Dvořák wrote the Rondo in G minor, which Wihan premiered in Chrudim. The trio also premiered Dvořák's Dumky Trio (1891).

Wihan had asked Dvořák to write a cello concerto for him, but the composer had always maintained a concerto was not the best way of displaying a cello's strengths, as it would be swamped by the orchestra. However, in 1894-95, Dvořák wrote the Cello Concerto in B minor in New York City, with Hanuš Wihan's playing in mind. Wihan made various suggestions for improvement, some of which Dvořák accepted. But he would not accept Wihan's suggested cadenza for the final movement as it clashed with his idea of the movement as a tribute to his seriously ill sister-in-law. It was intended that Wihan would perform the premiere of the work in London on 19 March 1896, but his contractual obligations with the Czech String Quartet clashed with the only possible date for the premiere. The soloist was the little-known Leo Stern. There was no truth to a rumour that the two men had any sort of falling out over the matter. Wihan did perform the concerto in The Hague (under Willem Mengelberg, or Dvořák), Amsterdam and Budapest (the last under the composer's baton), and he took part in the premiere of Dvořák's G major Quartet, Op. 106, that year. Dvořák's original score, before it was altered with Wihan's suggested changes, has been described as "much more musical", and this version has been performed from time to time.

Wihan had been playing with the Czech String Quartet for some years, and in the latter stages of his career he reduced his appearances as soloist and chamber musician and appeared with the Quartet exclusively. In 1906 Lionel Tertis worked with the Quartet, and noticed Wihan's habit of spitting on the floor during rehearsals. He retired in 1914, but arranged to be paid 20 per cent of the Quartet's earnings until his death. He was replaced in the Quartet by Ladislav Zelenka. In 1919, on the reorganization of the Prague Conservatory, he was appointed professor of chamber music and professor of the cello, and retained these posts until his death the following year. His pupils included Artur Krása, Otakar Berger, Jan Burian, Julius Junek, Rudolf Pavlata, Maxmilian Škvor and Bedřich Vaska.

He died aged 64 on 1 May 1920, the exact anniversary of Dvořák's death in 1904.

In 1985 the Wihan Quartet was established in memory of Hanuš Wihan by members of the Prague Academy.

== Sources ==
- Grove's Dictionary of Music and Musicians, 5th ed., 1954
