= Ševčík-Lhotský Quartet =

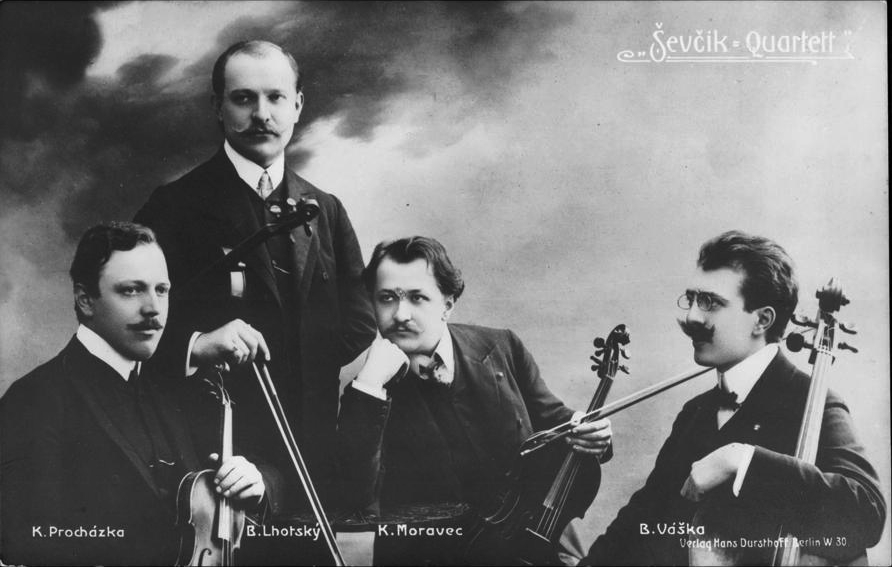
Ševcik Quartet

The Ševčík-Lhotský String Quartet (Czech: Ševčíkovo–Lhotského kvarteto) was a well-known Czech musical ensemble that was founded as the Ševčík Quartet (Czech: Ševčíkovo kvarteto) at Warsaw in 1903 that continued to the 1930s.

== Personnel ==
The founding members of the quartet were:

1st violin: Bohuslav Lhotský
2nd violin: Karel Procházka
viola: Karel Moravec
violoncello: Bedrich Váska (until 1911), succeeded by Ladislav Zelenka (until 1914), and by Antonio Fingerland.

== Origins ==
Bohuslav Lhotský, Karel Procházka and Karel Moravec were all pupils of the Czech violin teacher Otakar Ševčík (b. 1852), who had control of the violin department at the Prague Conservatory between 1892 and 1901. The master's method was based on the semitone system, the fingers remaining at equal distances on all the strings during the technical studies, leading to great safety, precision and fluency in performance. Following the success of his pupil Jan Kubelík, his students gathered in great numbers at his residence at Písek. This quartet was the later counterpart of the Bohemian or Czech Quartet, which was formed by four pupils of the Prague cello professor Hanuš Wihan a decade previously.

They gave the premiere of Bohuslav Martinů's first string quartet in 1927.

== Recordings ==
(as 'Sevcikovo-Lhotskeho Quartet')

- Dvořák: Quartet in F major op 96 (His Master's Voice 78 rpm European issue, AN 332-334).
- Smetana: Quartet no 1 in E minor (HMV 78 rpm European issue, AN 326-329).
- Glazunov: Quartet no 4 in A minor op 64, Scherzo (HMV 78 rpm, European, AN 339).
- Borodin: Quartet no 2, Nocturne (HMV 78 rpm, European, AN 339).

== Sources ==
- A. Eaglefield-Hull, A Dictionary of Modern Music and Musicians (Dent, London 1924).
- R.D. Darrell, The Gramophone Shop Encyclopedia of Recorded Music (New York 1936).
