= Violin Concerto (Strauss) =

1881/1882 work by Richard Strauss

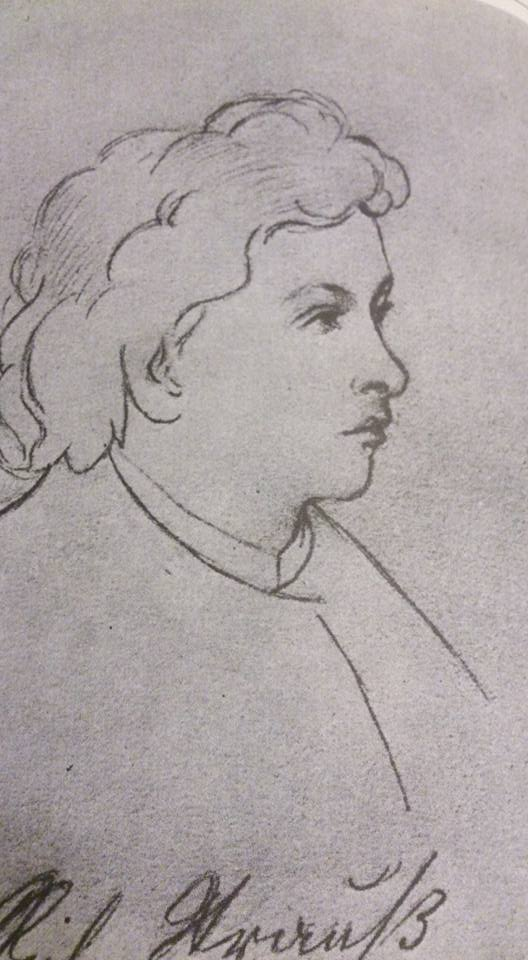
A portrait of Richard Strauss in 1880.

The Violin Concerto in D minor, Op. 8, is a concertante work written from 1881 to 1882 by the German composer Richard Strauss.

This violin concerto was written during the composer's teenage years while he was still attending his last two years of school, and is less distinctive than many of his later orchestral works. Despite this it contains some bold and inventive solo writing as well as occasional passages that hint at the composer's mature harmonic style. Though written in the romantic tradition of its time, it hints at the young composer's reverence of masters of the preceding classical period, especially Mozart and Beethoven. In 1880 he had first begun to turn to large scale compositions during a tempestuous compositional interval after having decided to devote his life to composition, including a symphony in D minor (TrV 94), which was well received. The following year he began to sketch the Violin Concerto in D minor, among several other compositions. Although it is today rarely performed, it received encouraging reviews, including the following by Karl Klindworth from May 1882, before its premiere:

So far as the form of the pieces is concerned there is little to find fault with, but I could wish for content of greater significance before the young composer embarks on a public career. Even so, I like the violin concerto best, and I should be delighted if it turned out to be effective and viable enough to banish Bruch's G minor from our concert halls.

The work was dedicated to Benno Walter, the concertmaster of the Munich Court Orchestra, and also Strauss's violin teacher and relative. (Benno Walter was the son of (Johann) Georg Walter, and the first cousin of Richard Strauss's father Franz Strauss, and hence Richard's cousin once removed; Richard called him "cousin", but he is sometimes referred to as his "uncle".)

== Premieres and performance history ==
The Violin Concerto was first performed publicly on 5 December 1882, in the Bösendorfersaal of the Herrengasse in Vienna. The soloist was the dedicatee Benno Walter. Strauss himself played his own piano reduction of the orchestral parts. Walter and Strauss played this violin-piano version again in Munich on 8 February 1883.

The concerto's debut with violin and orchestra had to wait another seven years. On 4 March 1890, in Cologne, Benno Walter played with an orchestra conducted by Franz Wüllner.

The first time Strauss himself conducted the concerto was on 17 February 1896, in the Liszt-Verein in Leipzig. The soloist was the 23-year-old (Gustav) Alfred Krasselt (3 June 1872 - 27 September 1908), concert master of Munich's Kaim Orchestra (later the Munich Philharmonic).

Strauss went on to perform the concerto either as piano accompanist (Dresden 27 November 1902, Birmingham (UK) 10 December 1903 (Max Mossel on violin), Munich 24 June 1910 (Alfred Rose on violin)), or conducting with orchestra (Munich 13 January 1897 (Alfred Krasselt), Birmingham UK 2 December 1904 (Max Mossel), Bonn 7 November 1907).

The concerto has been performed only once at the London Proms: on 18 September 1912 at the Queens Hall, with Sir Henry Wood conducting The New Queen's Hall Orchestra with violinist Arthur Catterall.

== Structure ==
The composition consists of three movements:

1. Allegro
2. Lento, ma non troppo
3. Rondo. Presto

== Recordings ==
The first recording was the 1976 HMV release by Rudolf Kempe and the Staatskapelle Dresden with Ulf Hoelscher on violin, which was remastered and reissued in the Warner Classics 2013 CD.

CD title (release date)	Violinist	Conductor and Orchestra.	Reference
R. Strauss: Complete Orchestral Works (2013)	Ulf Hoelscher	Rudolf Kempe, Staatskapelle Dresden	Warner Classics 4317802
Bruch, Busoni & Strauss: Violin Concertos (1999)	Ingolf Turban	Lior Shambadal, Bamberg Symphony Orchestra	Claves - 509318
Korngold & Strauss - Violin Concertos (2009)	Pavel Šporcl	Jirí Kout, Prague Symphony Orchestra	Supraphon SU39622
R. Strauss: Violin Concerto & Violin Sonata (2013)	Thomas Albertus Irnberger	Martin Sieghart, Israel Chamber Orchestra.	Gramola - GRAM98992
Strauss & Headington: Violin Concertos (1991)	Xue-Wei	Jane Glover, London Philharmonic Orchestra	ASV: CDDCA780
Strauss - The Concertos (1999).	Boris Belkin	Vladimir Ashkenazy, Berlin Radio Symphony Orchestra	Decca - Double Decca - E4602962
Strauss & Bartok: Violin Concertos (2014)	Valentin Zhuk	Alexander Lazarev, Moscow State Symphony Orchestra	Audiophile - APL101519
R. Strauss: Complete Chamber Music (2014)	Ernö Sebestyen	Wolfgang Sawallisch (piano)	Brilliant Classics - 9231
R. Strauss: Violin Concerto, Sonata in E Flat (2006)	Sarah Chang	Wolfgang Sawallisch, Bavarian Radio Symphony Orchestra	EMI Classics - BOOOO3W81N
Richard Strauss: Violin Concerto / Don Quixote (2019)	James Ehnes	Sir Andrew Davis, Melbourne Symphony Orchestra	ABC Classics: ABC4817471
Richard Strauss: Concertante Works (2019)	Tasmin Little	Michael Collins, BBC Symphony Orchestra	Chandos CHAN20034
