= Karel Hoffmann =

Czech violinist

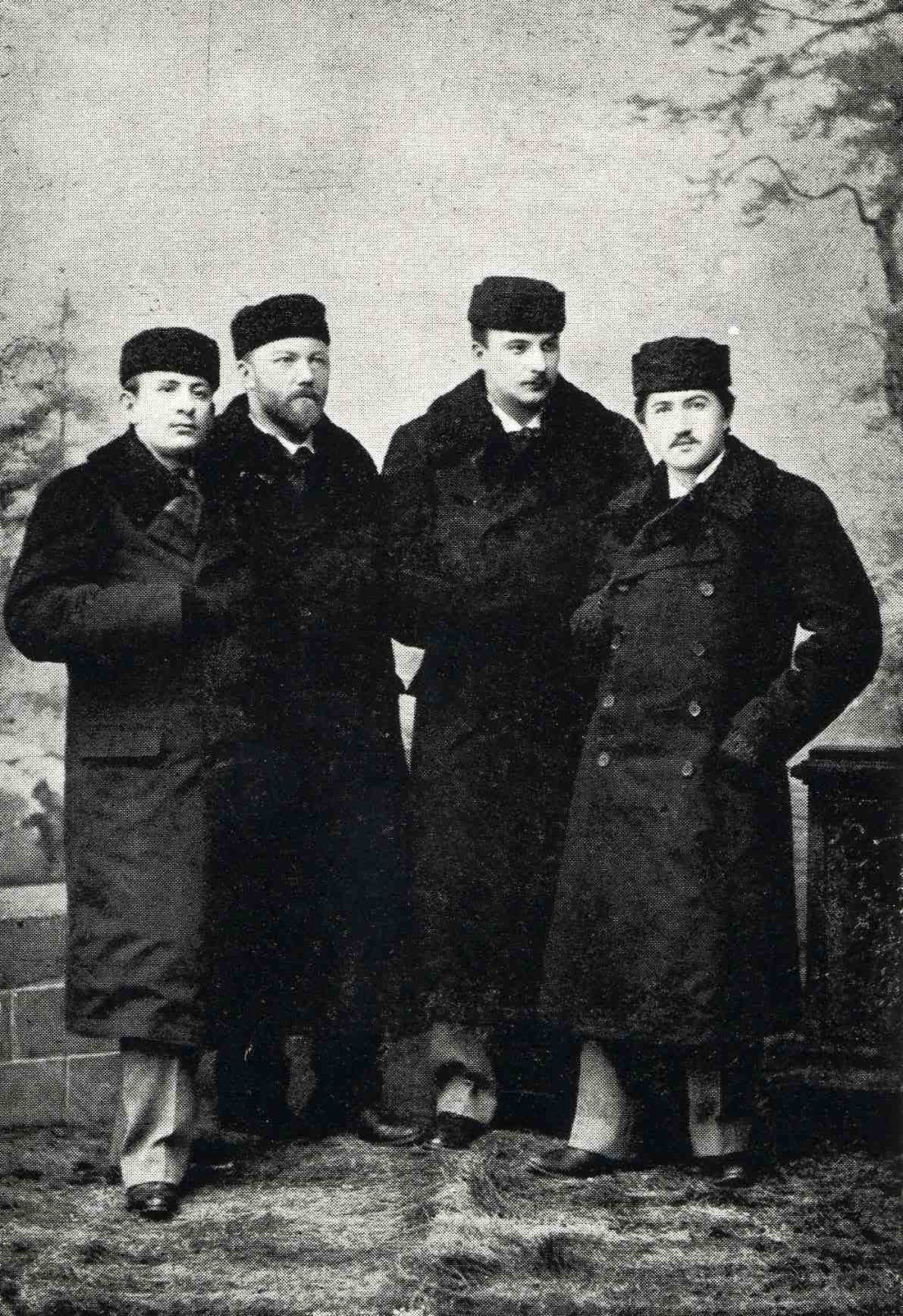
Bohemian Quartet in 1895 – Karel Hoffmann, Hanuš Wihan, Oskar Nedbal, Josef Suk

Karel Hoffmann (12 December 1872 – 30 March 1936) was a Czech violinist and music pedagogue, a founding member and first violinist of the Bohemian Quartet. In 1926–1927, he was appointed the rector of the Prague Conservatory.

== Biography ==
Hoffmann was born in Smíchov (today a part od Prague), as the ninth child of weaver Karel Hoffmann. He was a weak child, and one of his older brothers chose for him to learn the violin as a "lighter work". In 1885, he began his studies at the Prague Conservatory, as a pupil in the class of Antonín Bennewitz. The first important event of his career was his entry to the chamber music class of Hanuš Wihan. There he met Josef Suk, Oskar Nedbal, and Otto Berger – his future colleagues and collaborators from the Bohemian Quartet. They founded the quartet officially in 1892, and the activity of the ensemble lasted 42 years. Hoffmann was the only permanent member of the ensemble throughout its 1892–1934 existence. In 1934, after the death of violist Jiří Herold, Hoffmann founded the Bohemian Trio with Ladislav Zelenka and Jan Heřman.

Hoffmann began to assert himself also as a soloist at the end of the 19th century, in addition to his chamber music activities. He played the solo violin part in the first Prague performance of the Double Concerto in A minor by Johannes Brahms. He also performed the Violin Sonata No. 3 in C minor, Op.45 in Vienna together with composer Edvard Grieg, and the Czech composer Josef Suk dedicated some of his works to him. In 1901, he performed together with Czech Philharmonic the Violin Concerto in A minor, Op. 53 by Antonín Dvořák in Vienna.

In the "Spolek pro moderní hudbu" (Society for Modern Music) Hoffmann collaborated with renowned Czech and foreign artists – Ilona Štěpánová-Kurzová, Rudolf Karel, Jaroslav Křička, Josef Bohuslav Förster, Ladislav Vycpálek, Jan Kunc, Arthur Honegger, Maurice Ravel, Ottorino Respighi and Paul Hindemith among others.

In 1932, he developed cancer and was forced to undergo surgery. He recovered for a short time and resumed his activities. However, a second surgery in 1934 was unsuccessful and Karel Hoffmann died in Prague on 30 March 1936.
