= Jiří Herold =

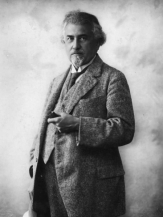
- Born: 16 April 1875; Rakovník, Austria-Hungary
- Died: 13 November 1934 (aged 59); Prague, Czechoslovakia
- Occupations: Violist; Violinist; Teacher
- Works: Etudes for viola

Jiří Karel Herold (16 April 1875 – 13 November 1934) was a Czech violist, music teacher and violinist. He was concertmaster of the Czech Philharmonic, violist of the Czech Quartet and the Herold Quartet.

== Family and studies ==
Jiří Karel Herold was born on 16 April 1875 in Rakovník. He was the son of the accountant of the Rakovník brewery, pianist and organist Adolf Herold and Marie Knoblochová. The Herold family lived in house No. 81 on the corner of Palackého and Vysoké streets. He studied violin at the Conservatory in Prague with professor Franz Lachner, later with professor and director of the conservatory Antonín Bennewitz. He graduated in 1895. He married Markéta Friedlová, with whom he had sons Jan, Aurel and Jiří, who worked as an opera singer and teacher in Ostrava. Jiří Herold died on 13 November 1934 and was buried at the Olšany Cemetery, just like his father Adolf.

== Career ==
He began his concert career while still studying at the conservatory, playing a concerto for two violins at the Rudolfinum in his fourth year and performing with his classmates, under the name Smetana Quartet, in his hometown of Rakovník, during his sixth year. He also gave concerts as a soloist in the army orchestra during his mandatory military service in Jihlava and Vienna. After a short teaching experience, he joined an orchestra in Lviv as the concertmaster. In 1901, he became concertmaster of the newly established Czech Philharmonic under the direction of Rafael Kubelík. Together with fellow players from the Philharmonic, Jiří Herold founded Herold's Prague String Quartet, with which he performed concerts throughout Europe. He then became a member of the Czech Quartet, where he took a seat in 1906 at the viola desk after Oskar Nedbal.

Jiří Herold gained his first teaching experience after his military service as a violin tutor to Princess Fürstenberg, whose family lived at the Leontýn Castle near Křivoklát, in Vienna and in Opatija. In 1922, he became a professor at the Prague Conservatory, teaching chamber music.

== Violin making activity ==
He became interested in violin making already during his student years. He was influenced in this direction by the Prague violinists Ferdinand Lantner and Karl Boromejský Dvořák. During his stay in Vienna he communicated with the violinist of the Opera Johann Stübiger, and after returning to Prague with František Lantner, František Špidlen and Josef Kříž. He started his own practice only in 1914, when he acquired the material and began to set up the workshop. He worked in his residence in Prague, and built over 50 instruments: 43 violins, 10 violas and two cellos. He used Guarneri and Stradivari models. Although he was not a professional in this field, his tools are of a good standard. One cello is in the collection of the Prague Conservatory.

== Works ==
- Jiří Herold: Etudes for viola (Edition No.:H04638, ISMN:9790006571895, Publisher: Bärenreiter)

== Discography ==
In 2025 the Italian violist Marco Misciagna recorded the world premiere of Jiří Herold's Etudes for viola.

- Bohuslav Martinů: Songs, Vol. 2 - The Months (Hrochová, Koukl);
- Dvořák: Quartet "no 6" (now no.12, 'American') in F major op 96 (Polydor 78 rpm, 95084-95086). (as 'Bohemian (Suk) Quartet');
- Dvořák: Quartet "no 3" (now no.10) in E flat major op 51, Dumka only (Polydor 78 rpm, 95087).
