= Benno Walter =

German violinist and teacher

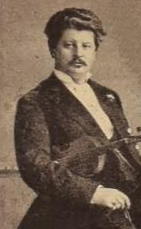
Benno Walter

Benno Walter (17 June 1847 – 23 October 1901) was a German violinist and teacher, who had associations with Richard Strauss and his family, to whom he was closely related, and also with Richard Wagner.

== Career ==
Benno Walter was born in Munich on 17 June 1847, the son of (Johann) Georg Walter, a municipal musician. He trained at the Royal School of Music (Königliche bayerische Musikschule, now the Hochschule für Musik und Theater München) in Munich. He was a child prodigy on the violin, and his father took him on concert tours. In 1862 he became a trainee musician at the Munich Court Theatre. In 1864 he achieved full status as a court musician, and in 1870 he became the orchestra leader, and also began to teach at his alma mater, the Royal School of Music.

He owned the Cremona 1720 "ex Bavarian" violin made by Antonio Stradivari. The Royal House of Bavaria had acquired the violin during the early 19th Century. King Ludwig II of Bavaria, the patron of Richard Wagner, presented the violin to Walter in 1870. Its later owners included Henri Verbrugghen.

At the Royal School of Music, in 1872 he became the violin teacher of the 8-year-old Richard Strauss, his cousin's son. Georg Walter's sister Maria Anna Kunigunde Walter was the mother of Richard's father Franz Strauss, making Franz and Benno first cousins. Richard Strauss and Benno Walter were therefore cousins once removed, but Strauss called him "cousin" (and Walter is sometimes referred to as his "uncle").

Benno Walter took over as first violinist of the Walter String Quartet when his elder brother and founder of the quartet Joseph Walter died in 1875. He toured with the quartet in Europe and America. Richard Strauss's String Quartet in A, Op. 2, was dedicated to the members of the quartet: Benno Walter, Michael Steiger, Anton Thoms, and Hanuš Wihan, who had given it its first performance.

Strauss's Violin Concerto in D minor was also dedicated to Walter, who gave the first performance, on 5 December 1882 in Vienna, with Strauss playing a piano reduction of the orchestral part. Walter also gave the first performance with orchestra, on 4 March 1890, in Cologne, with an orchestra conducted by Franz Wüllner.

Benno Walter had a close relationship with Richard Wagner. He played the solo violin part at the first performance of Parsifal at Bayreuth in 1882, and was a frequent guest at Wahnfried.

Adolf Sandberger's Violin Sonata, Op, 10 (1892) was dedicated to Walter.

He died in Konstanz on 23 October 1901, aged 54.
