= Přívrat =

- Municipality
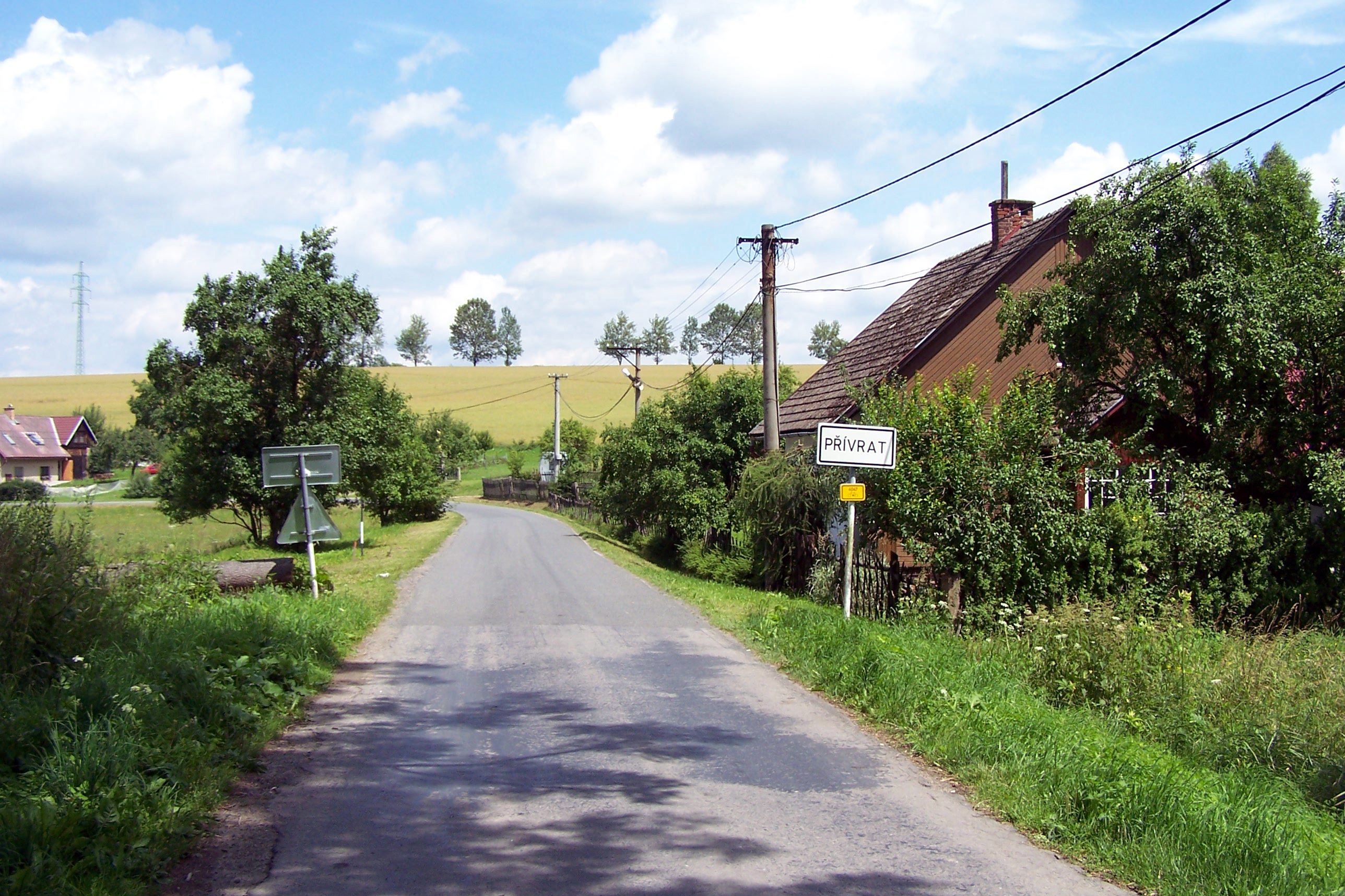
- Entrance to Přívrat

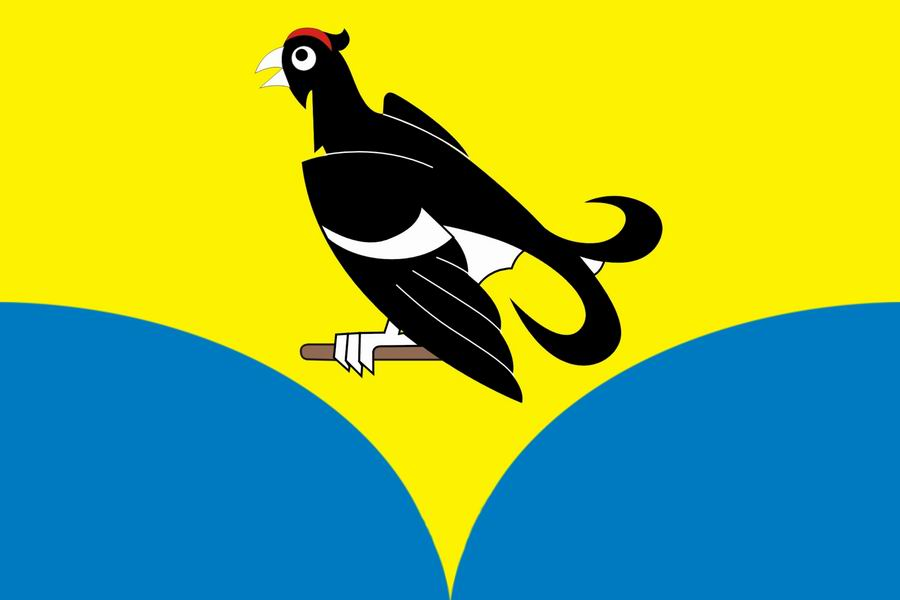
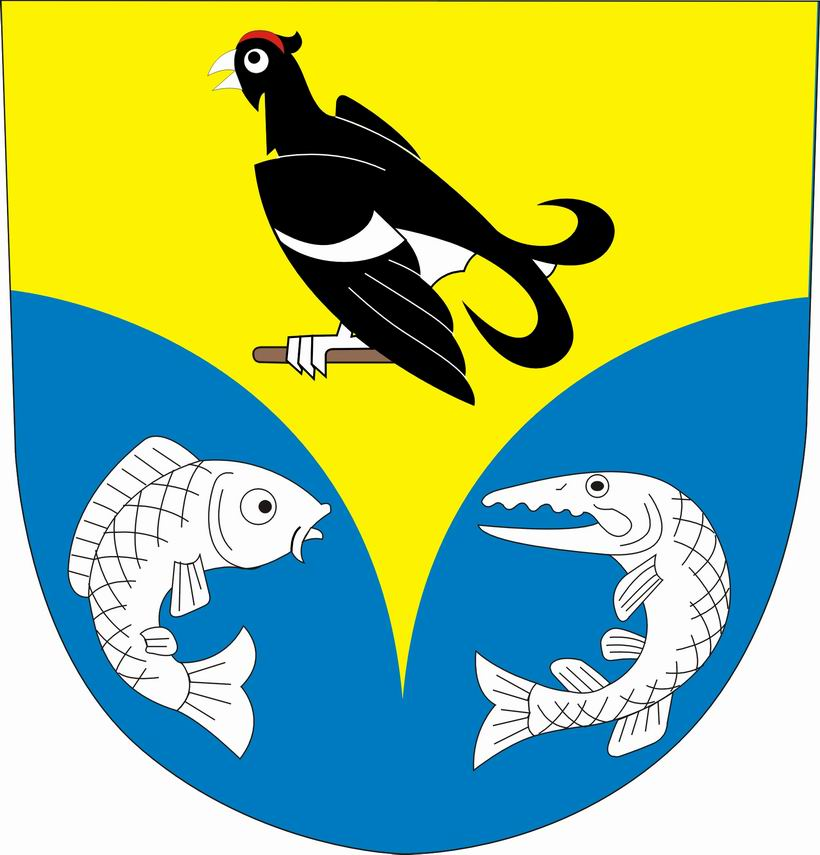
- Flag Coat of arms

- Location in the Czech Republic
- Coordinates: 49°55′29″N 16°23′49″E
- Country: Czech Republic
- Region: Pardubice
- District: Ústí nad Orlicí
- First mentioned: 1455

Area
  - Total: 7.30 km^{2} (2.82 sq mi)
- Elevation: 450 m (1,480 ft)

Population (2026-01-01)
  - Total: 371
  - Density: 50.8/km^{2} (132/sq mi)
- Time zone: UTC+1 (CET)
  - Summer (DST): UTC+2 (CEST)
- Postal code: 560 02
- Website: www.privrat.cz

Přívrat is a municipality and village in Ústí nad Orlicí District in the Pardubice Region of the Czech Republic. It has about 400 inhabitants.

Přívrat lies approximately 7 kilometres (4 mi) south of Ústí nad Orlicí, 47 km (29 mi) east of Pardubice, and 143 km (89 mi) east of Prague.

== Demographics ==
Historical population
Year	Pop.	±%
1869	638	—
1880	678	+6.3%
1890	635	−6.3%
1900	682	+7.4%
1910	672	−1.5%
1921	647	−3.7%
1930	677	+4.6%
1950	434	−35.9%
1961	405	−6.7%
1970	358	−11.6%
1980	350	−2.2%
1991	290	−17.1%
2001	300	+3.4%
2011	319	+6.3%
2021	351	+10.0%
Source: Censuses

== Notable people ==
- Antonín Bennewitz (1833–1926), violinist and conductor
