= General Kyd Stradivarius =

The "General Kyd" is a nickname applied to several Stradivarius instruments crafted by Italian luthier Antonio Stradivari of Cremona and owned for a time by British General Alexander Kyd (d. 1826). They include a violin made in 1714, a violin made in 1720, and the General Kyd; ex-Stern Stradivarius cello made in 1684. These instruments have been owned and played by some of the world's leading musicians. The 1714 violin was owned from about 1980 to 1990 by Itzhak Perlman, who made most of his early recordings using this instrument. The 1720 violin's owners included composer Rebecca Clarke.

The General Kyd cello was used by the English cellist Leo Stern in the premiere of Antonín Dvořák's Cello Concerto in B minor in London in 1896.

Noted owners of the General Kyd-Stern are its namesakes, General Kyd and Leo Stern, as well as Lord Amherst of Hackney, W.E. Hill & Sons and Jean-Baptiste Vuillaume.

At the time of Stern's death in 1904, the General Kyd was valued at US$6,000; its current value is US$9.5 million.

This cello, currently owned by the Los Angeles Philharmonic and played by Robert deMaine, was previously played by Peter Stumpf, and was stolen from Stumpf's porch in 2004. The General Kyd was later recovered after narrowly escaping being turned into a fancy CD rack. Robert Cauer, who had been taking care of the cello for 20 years, restored it and gave it back its voice
