= Peter Stumpf (cellist) =

American cellist

- Education: Curtis Institute of Music; New England Conservatory
- Occupation: Cellist
- Known for: Principal cellist, Los Angeles Philharmonic (2002–2012)
- Musical career
- Genres: Classical
- Instrument: Cello

Peter Stumpf is the former principal cellist of the Los Angeles Philharmonic. He was educated first at the Curtis Institute of Music as a student of Orlando Cole and then the New England Conservatory. He started his professional career at age sixteen as a cellist in the Hartford Symphony, then spent twelve years as associate principal of the Philadelphia Orchestra, before assuming his position at the start of the Los Angeles Philharmonic's 2002/2003 season. He took a year's sabbatical from the LA Phil in 2011 to teach full-time at Indiana University's Jacob School of Music. He left the orchestra permanently in 2012.

Stumpf is also the cellist of the Johannes String Quartet. Musicians he has collaborated with include Emanuel Ax, Wolfgang Sawallisch, Mitsuko Uchida, and the Emerson String Quartet.

Stumpf has also taught the cello at the New England Conservatory and USC Thornton School of Music,

== Stolen cello ==
On April 27, 2004, the General Kyd, a $3.5 million Stradivarius on loan to Stumpf from the Los Angeles Philharmonic, was stolen after he left it on his porch. It was discovered in a dumpster by Melanie Stevens, a thirty-year-old nurse, after a home surveillance video from across the street showed the cello being lifted by a clumsy thief on a bicycle at around 6:30 am. Stevens initially asked her boyfriend to turn it into a CD cabinet, though a week and a half later, she caught a news report about the missing cello and the $50,000 reward for its return. She identified it on the police website and sought to return it, with the aid of a lawyer.
