= Leo Stern (musician) =

English cellist

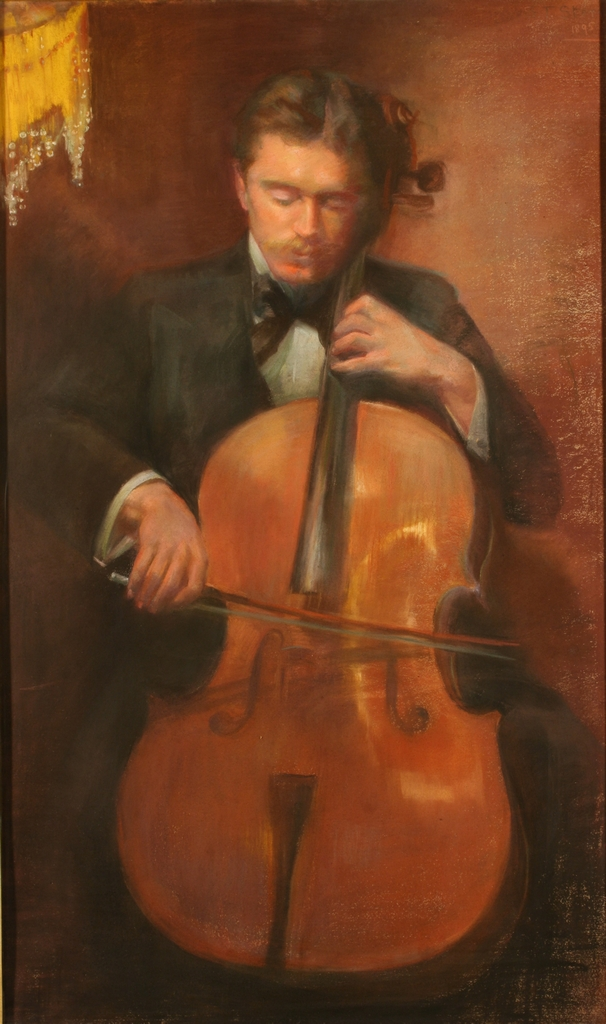
Drawing by Sophie Stern, 1895

Leo Stern (5 April 1862 – 10 September 1904) was an English cellist, best remembered for being the soloist in the premiere performance of Antonín Dvořák's Cello Concerto in B minor in London in 1896.

== Biography ==
Leopold Lawrence Stern was born in Brighton in 1862. His father was a German violinist and conductor of the Brighton Symphony Society, and his mother an English pianist. He initially studied chemistry at the South Kensington School of Chemistry, while studying the cello privately with Hugo Daubert. He worked in a business in Thornliebank near Glasgow from 1880 to 1883, but abandoned chemistry and entered the Royal Academy of Music, where he studied cello under Alessandro Pezze and then Carlo Alfredo Piatti. He later had lessons in Leipzig from Julius Klengel and Karl Davydov.

He appeared with Adelina Patti (in her 1888 tour), Émile Sauret and Ignaz Paderewski, and in Paris played with Jules Massenet, Benjamin Godard and Francis Thomé. He was a favourite of Queen Victoria and often played at Windsor Castle, Balmoral Castle and Osborne House.

In 1895 he visited Prague, where his playing became well known to Antonín Dvořák. Although Dvořák's recently completed Cello Concerto in B minor was dedicated to Hanuš Wihan and Dvořák wanted nobody but Wihan to play it in public for the first time, it was Leo Stern who was given the honour (there are conflicting versions of how this came about). The premiere occurred on 19 March 1896 at the Queen's Hall, London, under the composer's baton. Stern played the concerto in Prague (three weeks later, again conducted by Dvořák,) at the Leipzig Gewandhaus (he was the first Englishman ever invited to play there) and with the Berlin Philharmonic. He was later summoned to play for Kaiser Wilhelm II at Potsdam. In 1897-98 he toured the United States (where he played with Theodore Thomas's orchestra in Chicago, the Boston Symphony Orchestra and the New York Philharmonic Society) and Canada. He played the New York premiere of Dvořák's Cello Concerto on 5 March 1897.

Leo Stern died in London on 10 September 1904, aged 42.

Stern used three cellos in his career:

- a cello by Johannes Florenus Guidantus
- the General Kyd Stradivarius, described as "the largest cello in existence", which was presented to him by a group of admirers headed by Lord Amherst of Hackney
- the "Baudiot" Stradivarius (later owned by Gregor Piatigorsky).

The Leo Stern Prize was established in 1907 in Stern's memory, and was awarded annually to assist a student of the cello at the Royal College of Music. The award is now in abeyance, the last award having been made in 1997. Previous winners have included Martin Lovett (1944) and Amaryllis Fleming (1945).

== Marriages ==
Leo Stern was married twice, both times to American-born women. In 1894 he married Nettie Carpenter (c. 1869-?), a former child prodigy violinist who had gained first prize at the Paris Conservatory and studied under Pablo de Sarasate, who was the godfather to her child (presumably from her first marriage). Sarasate had also given her a gold-embossed violin bow. Stern was Nettie Carpenter's second husband. They divorced, and in 1898 he married Suzanne Adams, a well-known coloratura soprano.

He wrote some light songs, one of which ('Coquette') was recorded by Suzanne Adams.

== Sources ==
- Grove's Dictionary of Music and Musicians, 5th ed, 1954
