= String Quartet No. 1 (Martinů) =

String Quartet No.1, (H. 117) (the French Quartet), is a chamber composition by the Czech composer Bohuslav Martinů.

Martinů was strongly drawn to the string quartet form from his childhood. He composed his first quartet, based on the poem Tři jezdci by Czech poet Jaroslav Vrchlický, at the age of eight. However, Martinů's juvenile works remain forgotten, are now archive material, and it is difficult to reconstruct them. Martinů made his first step into the world of quartet writing with his "French Quartet". The work was composed in Polička in 1918. In 1925 Martinů intended to have the composition performed in Paris, with the Ševčík Quartet. However, the quartet was not premièred until 1927 in Brno.

== Structure ==
The composition consists of four movements:

1. Moderato. Allegro ma non troppo
2. Andante moderato
3. Allegro non troppo
4. Allegro

The French Quartet, named for the work's Impressionist mood, is influenced by the works of Debussy and Ravel. It is the longest of all Martinů quartets. His typical individual style is not yet apparent, but the quartet contains the unquestionable quality and counts among the interesting examples of the composer's early chamber works.

The approximate duration of the work is 36 minutes.
