= Symphony No. 1 (Strauss) =

- by Richard Strauss
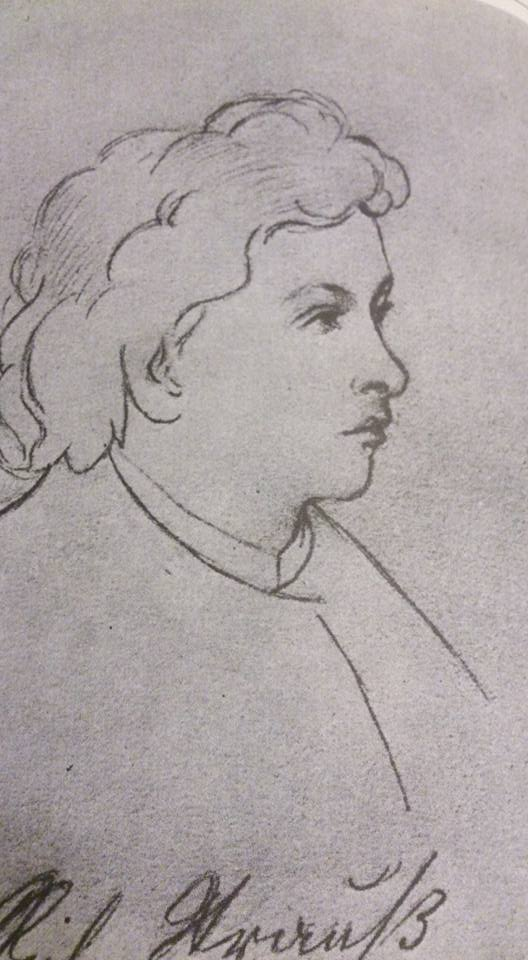
- Sketch of the composer by Else Demelius-Schenkl, in 1880
- Key: D minor
- Catalogue: TrV 94.
- Composed: 12 June 1880
- Performed: 30 March 1881

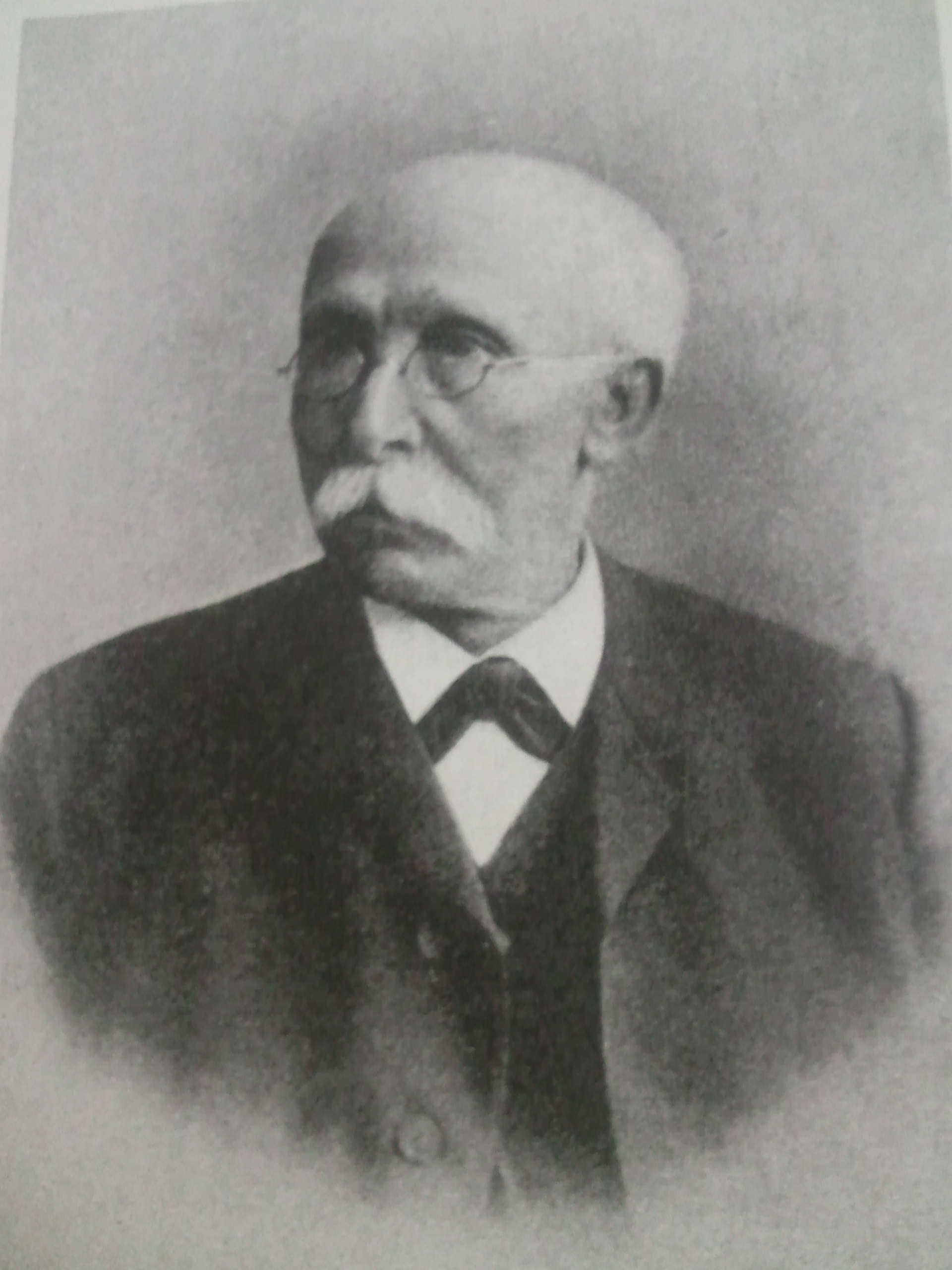
Franz Strauss, Munich Court Opera principal horn player and father to Richard Strauss

Richard Strauss composed his Symphony No. 1 in D minor (TrV 94) in 1880 when he was just 16 years old. It consists of four movements and lasts about 34 minutes. Although Strauss did not give a number to the symphony, it is often referred to as his First Symphony. It was premiered on 30 March 1881 at the Munich Academy of Music under the baton of Hermann Levi.

== Composition history ==
Strauss completed his musical studies with his composition teacher, Friedrich Wilhelm Meyer, in February 1880 (he was a conductor and had been hired as a private teacher by Richard's father Franz Strauss since 1875). By the age of 18, Strauss had composed nearly 150 works. Strauss wrote the symphony whilst attending school, from 12 March to 12 June 1880. He wrote to his mother "I'm getting on all right at school, the symphony is making jolly good progress, all four movements are finished now. I've scored the Scherzo and almost all of the first movement".

The four movements are:

1. Andante Maestoso – Allegro Vivace
2. Andante
3. Scherzo: Molto allegro, leggiero – Trio
4. Finale: Allegro Maestoso

Scott Warfield wrote that "the symphony in D minor follows the same formal plans that Strauss had been studying for nearly five years. The outer movements are real sonata-allegro movements, now complete with true development sections. The slow movement draws on the same model and the Scherzo follows the standard binary form."

The first movement opens with a fifty bar slow introduction, laying out thematic material used later. As Werbeck notes, within this introduction, Strauss goes through a series of modulations in which one two-bar theme is repeated in a sequence from D min, B♭7, E♭, B7, Emin, C, Fmin, D♭, ending in F. This wandering tonality is in contrast to the otherwise conservative musical conception of the symphony, and perhaps prefigures the future Strauss. The exposition starts with a shift to 3/4, and the transition uses thematic material both from the first theme and the introduction. "This opening movement also contains the first genuine development section in any symphonic work by Strauss. His technique for development in this lengthy subsection (188 bars) consists primarily repeating the material...as it sequences through various harmonic levels. This section marks the first time that Strauss went beyond the safety of a codified formal plan". By the age of sixteen, Strauss was writing a symphony which "need not be excused as a "student" work". As David Hurwitz notes, Strauss had a rare mastery of orchestration and in particular writing for woodwind: "Colorful scoring that captivates the ear and never fatigues or bores the listener makes a work sound shorter than it really is, even one that has a rather stiff little fugue in the middle of its finale, as does the First Symphony."

These more recent views contrast with Norman Del Mar, who stated in his 1962 study that "...the symphony is essentially a student work. It is nevertheless well made and has several interesting ideas."

== Performance history ==
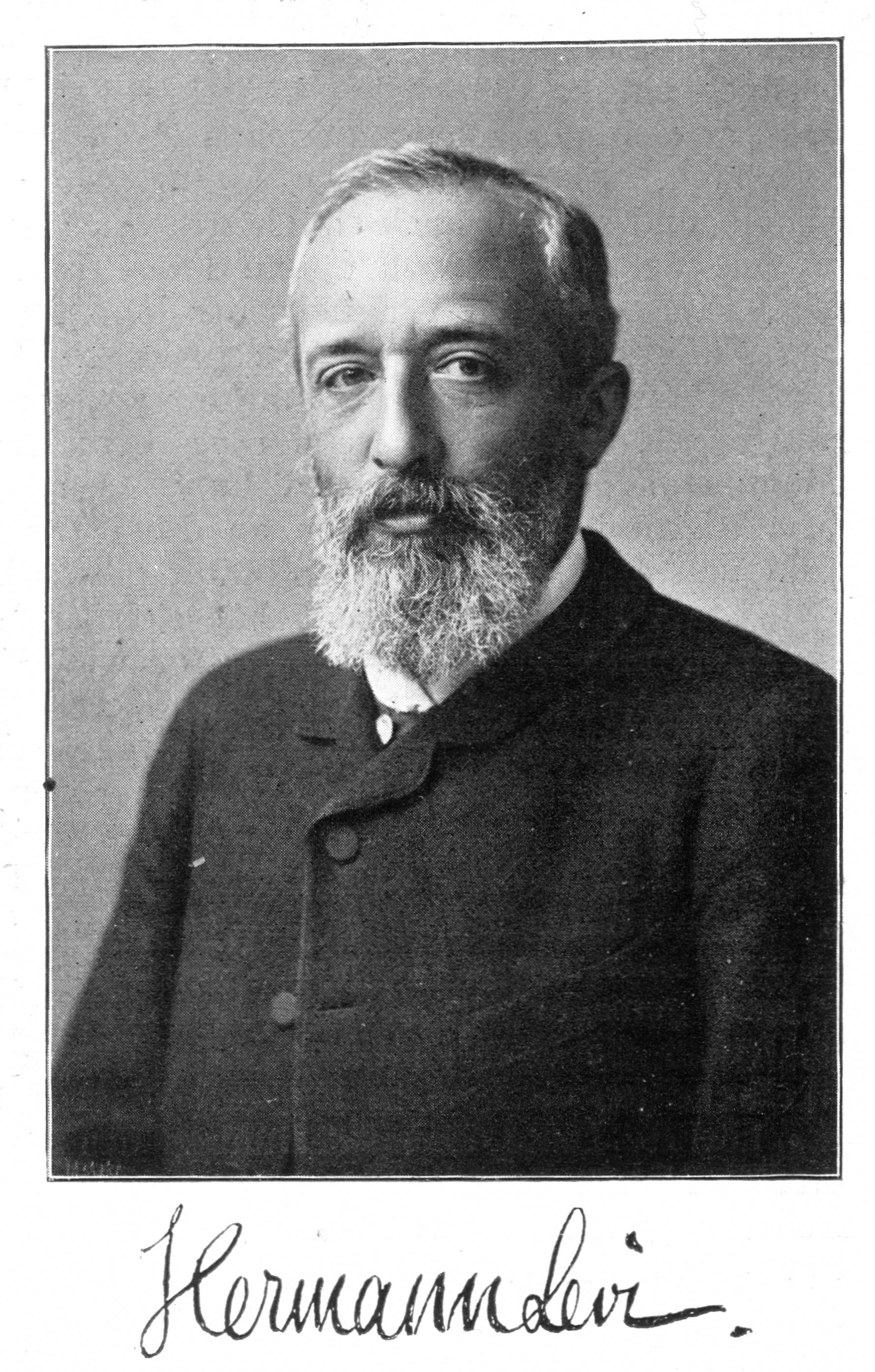
Hermann Levi who conducted the premier

The premiere was given at the Odeon concert hall in Munich as part of the subscription concert series of the Academy of music on 30 March 1881. The conductor was Hermann Levi, who was the musical director of the Munich Court opera from 1872–1896, and who was to premiere Richard Wagner's Parsifal in 1882.

Strauss' father Franz was much involved in the premiere, copying out all of the orchestral parts by hand and playing in the orchestra. Franz was so grateful to Levi for conducting the premiere, he asked how he could thank him. Levi "promptly seized the chance to ask the great horn-player to take part in the first performances of Parsifal at the Bayreuth festival in 1882". Despite his hostility to the works of Richard Wagner, Franz consented, taking his son Richard with him to the see Parsifal at Bayreuth.

The reviews of the premier were very positive, with the Muechner Neueste Nachritten of 3 April 1880 reporting that:

The third of the Musical Academies subscription concerts included one new work, a symphony in D minor by Richard Strauss. The recent performance of his String quartet had already drawn our attention to the significant talent possessed by this young composer. The symphony, too, shows considerable competence in the treatment of the form as well as remarkable skill in orchestration. It must be said that the work cannot lay claim to any true originality, but it demonstrates throughout a fertile musical imagination, to which composition comes easily.

The piece was later performed on 5 August 1893 by the amateur Wilden Gung'l orchestra conducted by his father Franz Strauss and with whom Richard had briefly played in the violins. Although father Franz wanted to have more performances of the symphony, to build on its initial success, son Richard Strauss had moved on and rejected it "as unsuitable for further performance" He gave the Wilden Gung'l orchestra the autograph score of the symphony along with the exclusive rights to perform the piece. As a result, the symphony has rarely been performed.

There exist very few recordings of the piece.

- Hong Kong Philharmonic Orchestra conducted by Kenneth Schermerhorn, recorded and issued in 1985
- Bavarian Radio Symphony Orchestra conducted by Karl Anton Rickenbacher, recorded in 1986 and issued in 1998
- Nuremberg Symphony Orchestra conducted by Klauspeter Seibel, recorded in 1988 and issued in 1989

== Instrumentation ==
Although described as being for "large orchestra", the orchestral forces are modest for the time.

- Two flutes, two oboes, two clarinets, two bassoons
- Four french horns, two trumpets, three trombones.
- Timpani
- Strings

== Sources ==
- Norman Del Mar, Richard Strauss: A critical commentary on his life and works, Volume 1. Faber and Faber, London, second edition 1985, ISBN 978-0-571-25096-7.
- Schuh, Willi (1982). Richard Strauss: A Chronicle of the Early Years 1864–1898, (translated by Mary Wittal), Cambridge University Press. ISBN 0-521-24104-9.
- Trenner, Franz. Richard Strauss Chronik, Verlag Dr Richard Strauss Gmbh, Wien, 2003. ISBN 3-901974-01-6.
- Werbeck, Walter (1999). Introduction to Richard Strauss Edition, Orchestral works, Volume 19, Symphonies. Verlag Dr.Richard Strauss GmbH, Wien. Published by C.F.Peters, Wien, 1999.
- Warfield, Scott (2003), "From "Too Many Works" to "Wrist Exercises": The Abstract Instrumental Compositions of Richard Strauss", Chapter 6 in Mark-Daniel Schmid (editor) The Richard Strauss Companion, Praeger, Westport Connecticut, London. ISBN 0-313-27901-2.
- Wilhelm, Kurt (1989). Richard Strauss: An Intimate Portrait. London: Thames & Hudson. ISBN 0-500-01459-0.
- Kaunitz, G. (2012). An Examination of Stylistic Elements in Richard Strauss's Wind Chamber Music Works and Selected Tone Poems. Retrieved from http://purl.flvc.org/fsu/fd/FSU_migr_etd-4941
