= Otakar Ševčík =

Czech violinist and teacher (1852–1934)

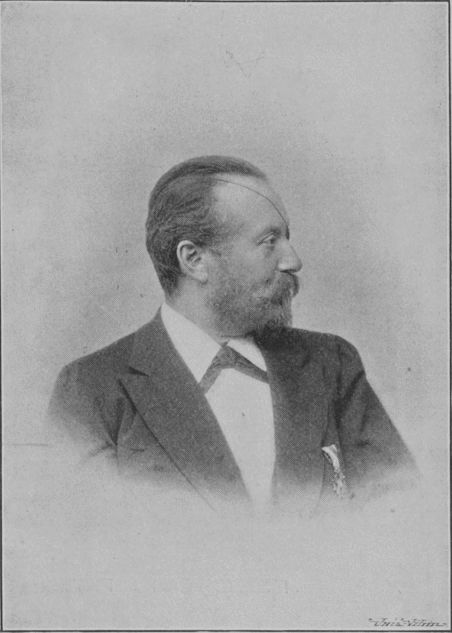
Otakar Ševčík in 1901

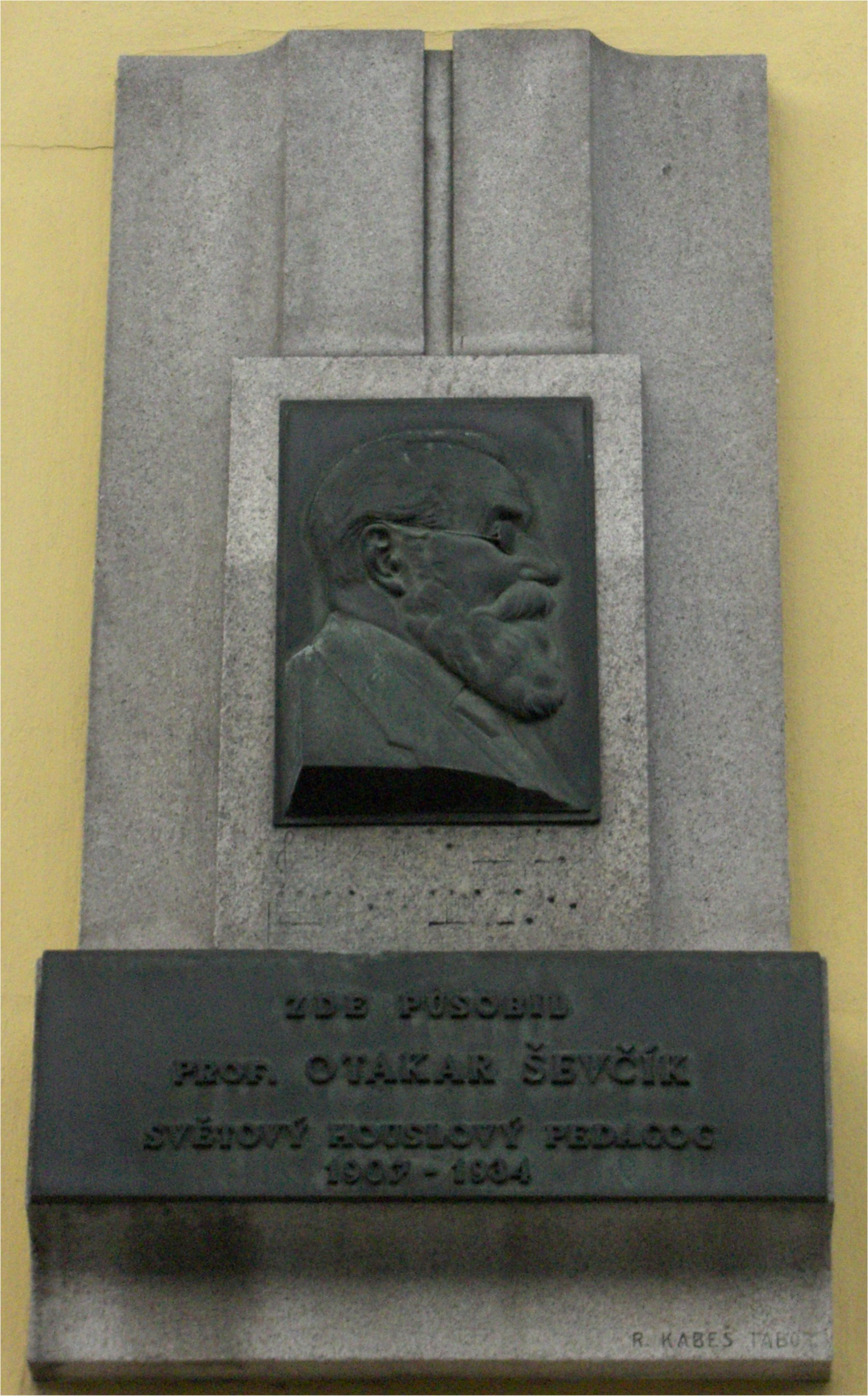
Otakar Ševčík sculpture in Písek

Otakar Ševčík (22 March 1852 – 18 January 1934) was a Czech violinist and influential teacher. He was known as a soloist and an ensemble player, including his occasional performances with Eugène Ysaÿe.

== Biography ==
Ševčík was born in Horažďovice, Bohemia, Austrian Empire. His father was the local village schoolmaster. Although he received his first music lessons from his father, he studied under Antonín Bennewitz at the Prague Conservatory (1866–1870) during which period a disease caused him to have his left eye enucleated. He was also taught by Hans Sitt. He began his career in 1870 as concertmaster of the Mozarteum concerts in Salzburg, where he also taught.

After 1873, he was concertmaster at the Prague Interim (Provisional) Theatre and the Komische Opera at the Ring Theatre in Vienna. From 1875-92 he was professor of violin at the music school of the Russian Music Society in Kiev, at the same time appearing frequently as soloist.

In 1892 he became head of the violin department at the Prague Conservatory, where he remained until 1906. He then taught privately in Písek. In 1909, he became director of the Violin Department at the Vienna Music Academy, until 1918, when at the end of World War I his nationality forced him to leave his position. He returned to the Prague Conservatory, where he stayed until 1921. After that he travelled in the United States and Great Britain as a well known teacher. He died in Písek, in the modern-day Czech Republic.

Ševčík taught violin at the Imperial Royal Academy of Music in Vienna, from 1909. He visited the United States four times between 1922 and 1932 to teach.

Ševčík was famous as a violin teacher in Salzburg, Vienna, Prague, Kharkiv, Kiev, London, Boston, Chicago, and New York City.

His violin studies and violin methods were published in several books and are still important as major teaching tools. These studies include The Little Ševčík, an elementary violin tutor, which teaches the semitone system in 149 exercises, the School of Violin Technics (Schule der Violintechnik, four parts, 1880), First Position, vol. II, 2nd to 7th Positions, and Vol. III, Shifting, and Preparatory Exercises in Double-Stopping, Opus 9, and the Schule der Bogentechnik (six parts, 1893).

== Sources ==
- Ševčík, Otakar. The Little Ševčík, An Elementary Violin Tutor (1901). Miami, Florida: Kalmus/Warner Music. ISBN 0-7692-9729-3.
- "Ševčík, Otakar". Österreichisches Musiklexikon (in German). Verlag der Österreichischen Akademie der Wissenschaften.
- Burczyk, Michał (2016). Otakar Ševčík – houslový pedagog (PDF) (Thesis).
