= Cello Concerto (Dvořák) =

Concerto by Antonín Dvořák

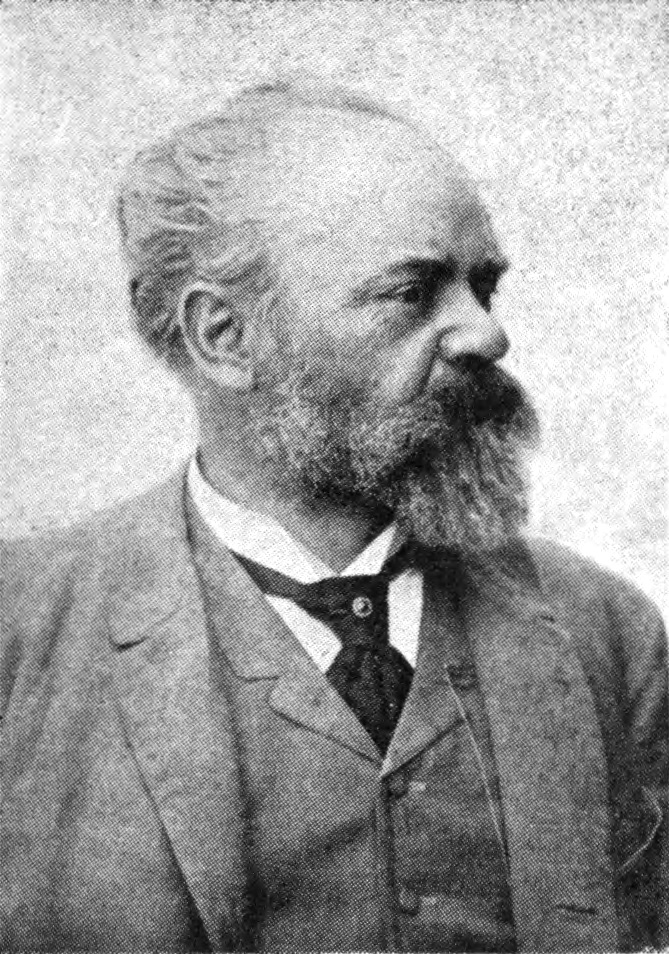
Antonín Dvořák in 1901

Antonín Dvořák's Cello Concerto in B minor, Op. 104, B. 191, is his last solo concerto. It was written in 1894 for his friend, the cellist Hanuš Wihan, but was premiered in London on 19 March 1896, by the English cellist Leo Stern.

== Structure ==
The piece is scored for a full romantic orchestra (with the exception of a fourth horn), containing two flutes (second doubling piccolo), two oboes, two clarinets, two bassoons, three horns, two trumpets, three trombones, tuba, timpani, triangle (last movement only), and strings, and is in the standard three-movement concerto format:

1. Allegro (B minor then B major; about 15 minutes)
2. Adagio, ma non troppo (G major; about 12 minutes)
3. Finale: Allegro moderato – Andante – Allegro vivo (B minor then B major; about 13 minutes)

Total duration: approximately 40 minutes.

== History ==
In 1865, early in his career, Dvořák started a Cello Concerto in A major (B. 10). The piece was written for Ludevít Peer, whom he knew well from the Provisional Theatre Orchestra in which they both played. He handed the cello score (with piano accompaniment) over to Peer for review but neither bothered to finish the piece. It was recovered from his estate in 1925.

Hanuš Wihan, among others, had asked for a cello concerto for quite some time, but Dvořák always refused, stating that the cello was a fine orchestral instrument but totally insufficient for a solo concerto. According to Josef Michl, Dvořák was fond of the middle register, but complained about the nasal high register and the mumbling bass. In a letter to a friend, Dvořák wrote that he himself was probably most surprised by his decision to write a cello concerto despite these long-held reservations.

Dvořák wrote the concerto while in New York City for his third term as the Director of the National Conservatory. In 1894 one of the teachers at the Conservatory, Victor Herbert, also a composer, finished his Cello Concerto No. 2 in E minor, Op. 30, and premiered it in a series of concerts, commencing on 9 March. Dvořák heard at least two performances of the piece and was inspired to fulfill Wihan's request in composing a cello concerto of his own. Herbert had been principal cellist in the orchestra that premiered Dvořák's "New World" Symphony on 16 December 1893. Herbert's middle movement was in B minor, which may have inspired Dvořák to write his concerto in the same key. It was started on 8 November 1894, and completed on 9 February 1895.

After seeing the score, Hanuš Wihan made various suggestions for improvement, including two cadenzas, one at the end of the third movement. But Dvořák accepted only a few minor changes and neither of the cadenzas. The third movement was a tribute to his sister-in-law, Josefina Kaunitzova, née Čermakova, who had written him a letter in November 1894 saying she was seriously ill. Specifically, the slow, wistful section, before the triumphant ending, quotes his song "Leave Me Alone (Kéž duch můj sám)", Op. 82, B.157, No. 1, a favorite of hers. She died in May 1895, after which the concerto was further revised.

Dvořák wrote to his publishers:

I give you my work only if you will promise me that no one – not even my friend Wihan – shall make any alteration in it without my knowledge and permission, also that there be no cadenza such as Wihan has made in the last movement; and that its form shall be as I have felt it and thought it out.

The finale, he wrote, should close gradually with a diminuendo "like a breath ... then there is a crescendo, and the last measures are taken up by the orchestra, ending stormily. That was my idea, and from it I cannot recede".

Hanuš Wihan first privately performed the concerto with the composer in Lužany in September 1895. Although he had rejected most of Wihan's suggested changes, Dvořák still very much wanted Wihan to premiere the work publicly and had promised him that role. An account of the sequence of events whereby it did not happen is given by Clapham. Francesco Berger, Secretary of the London Philharmonic Society, wrote to Dvořák in November 1895 to invite him to conduct a concert of some of his works in London. Dvořák agreed and proposed to conduct the premiere of his Cello Concerto with Wihan as soloist. Berger proposed the date 19 March 1896, but that date was not convenient for Wihan (it may have clashed with concert dates for the Bohemian Quartet, to which Wihan was already contracted). The Philharmonic Society insisted on the date and hired the English cellist Leo Stern without consulting Dvořák. The composer then at first refused to come for the concert. "Berger was horrified and greatly embarrassed," as the concert had already been advertised. Clapham conjectures that Wihan released Dvořák from his promise. Stern traveled to Prague to prepare his performance under Dvořák's supervision. By early March, all was agreed, and the premiere took place on 19 March in Queen's Hall, London, with Dvořák conducting. The cello played by Stern was the 1684 "General Kyd", one of only about 60 cellos made by Stradivarius.

After the London performance, Stern again played the solo part in what may have been the second public performance, in Prague on 11 April 1896, and later again in London. In December 1896 and during 1897–1898 the concerto was performed by a few cellists and conductors in England and the United States, including Stern in Chicago in January 1897. Wihan went on to perform the concerto with great success, first in January 1899 at The Hague, and later for the first time under Dvořák's baton in Budapest on 20 December 1899. Despite there having been so many public performances before Wihan's first, he and Dvořák remained firm friends.

The concerto was published in 1896 by N. Simrock, Berlin.

== The work ==
The first movement starts softly, with the clarinets introducing the theme. The full orchestra later plays the theme in a grandioso manner, leading to a horn solo which introduces the secondary, lyrical theme. The solo cello begins with a quasi improvisando section stating the theme in B major followed by triple-stopped chords. The cello then goes through various virtuosic treatments of the theme, before arriving at a gentle theme in D major, followed by an exciting return to a tutti section. In the development, the orchestra gradually modulates to A-flat minor, with the cello steering the orchestra to a triumphant tutti section in B major, followed by a recapitulation and a technically grueling coda, featuring seemingly endless octaves, double stops, and virtuosic runs. The movement ends tutti with the restatement of the first theme marked grandioso and fortissimo.

Following this opening essay is the lengthy Adagio, a lyrical and somewhat rhapsodic movement which features the most cadenza-like section in the piece, where the solo cello plays double stops accompanied by left-hand pizzicato on open strings. The movement ends with the cello playing harmonics very quietly.

The final movement is formally a rondo. It opens with the horn introducing the main theme. A long crescendo leads into a fortissimo tutti section. The solo cello then enters with the main theme. After a brief tutti section, the cello enters with a somber melody that dissolves into joyous quintuplets in D major. The somber melody returns after a brief tutti section, but this time, the cello takes the orchestra into G major, with an energy reminiscent of the second movement, before hesitantly transitioning to B major, where it first has a duet with the concertmaster, followed by restatements of the theme in B major. The movement slowly dies away (featuring a reference to the first theme of the first movement in the woodwinds) until the orchestra, spurred by the solo cello, provides an exciting and vigorous conclusion.

Dvořák's friend and mentor Johannes Brahms had written a double concerto for violin and cello in 1887, eight years before Dvořák's cello concerto. He corrected the proofs of Dvořák's concerto for the composer and hence he knew the work intimately from the score. In 1896, Robert Hausmann had played it at his home with Brahms' piano accompaniment, and Brahms is reported as saying: "If I had known that it was possible to compose such a concerto for the cello, I would have tried it myself!" On 7 March 1897, Brahms heard Hugo Becker's performance of the piece in a concert of the Vienna Philharmonic, and he said to his friend Gänsbacher before the concert: "Today you will hear a real piece, a male piece!"

Dvořák's original score, before he accepted a few of the numerous changes suggested by Hanuš Wihan, has been described as "much more musical", and this version has been performed from time to time. Some of Dvořák's music written in America, such as the American String Quartet, written in Spillville, Iowa, and the New World Symphony, was notably influenced by the American environment, specifically pentatonic scales used in African-American and Native American music. For the Cello Concerto such influence is less clear. One author suggests that there was little American influence on the concerto. Another author tells a story that one day when Dvořák was in New York but not at the Conservatory, said to be ill, a visitor to his home found him there composing. "His only illness was a fever of composition ... The remains of many past meals were strewn around the room, where he had been barricaded, probably for several days." Although the time is not specified, it might be understandable that in the later part of his sojourn at the Conservatory, when his salary had been cut and still not paid regularly, Dvořák could have felt less obligation to his duties.

== Performance history ==
Performances during Dvořák's life, excluding the premiere.

- Prague, Austria-Hungary: 11 April 1896, conducted by Dvořák himself, played by Leo Stern
- Leipzig, German Empire: 3 December 1896, conducted by Arthur Nikisch, played by Stern
- London, Great Britain: 12 December 1896, conducted by August Manns, played by Stern
- Chicago, United States: 29 January 1897, conducted by Manns, played by Stern
- Chicago, United States: 30 January 1897, conducted by Manns, played by Stern
- New York, United States: 5 March 1897, conducted by Manns, played by Stern
- New York, United States: 6 March 1897, conducted by Manns, played by Stern
- The Hague, Netherlands: 25 January 1899, conducted by Dvořák himself, played by Stern
- Budapest, Austria-Hungary: 20 December 1899, conducted by Dvořák himself, played by Stern

== Evaluation and recordings ==
Among all cello concertos, Dvořák's has been called "supreme," "the greatest", and the "king."

The concerto has been recorded by nearly every well-known cellist. Notable recordings include performances by Pablo Casals, Emanuel Feuermann, Pierre Fournier, Heinrich Schiff, Gregor Piatigorsky, Jacqueline du Pré, Bernard Greenhouse, Leonard Rose, Johannes Moser, Gauthier Capuçon, Truls Mork, Mischa Maisky, Julian Lloyd Webber and Steven Isserlis. Yo-Yo Ma recorded Dvořák's cello concerto three times, in 1986, 1995, and 2017. Mstislav Rostropovich made four commercial recordings on western labels (with Adrian Boult and the London Philharmonic Orchestra for EMI; with Herbert von Karajan and the Berlin Philharmonic for Deutsche Grammophon; with Carlo Maria Giulini and the London Philharmonic for EMI; and with Seiji Ozawa and the Boston Symphony Orchestra for Erato). János Starker also recorded the work three times: with the Philharmonia Orchestra and Walter Susskind for Angel/EMI, with Antal Doráti and the London Symphony Orchestra for Mercury, and with Leonard Slatkin and the St. Louis Symphony Orchestra for RCA Victor Red Seal.

== Media ==
I. Allegro

II. Adagio, ma non troppo

III. Finale: Allegro moderato – Andante – Allegro vivo
Performed by John Michel

I. Allegro
Performed by Hans Goldstein with the Milwaukee Youth Orchestra

- European Archive Copyright free LP recording of the Dvořák Cello Concerto, performed by Zara Nelsova (cello), Josef Krips (conductor), and the London Symphony Orchestra (for non-American viewers only) at the European Archive.
  - Mischel Cherniavsky, cello; 18 October 1943; Music Hall Theatre, Seattle
