= Bohemian Quartet =

Czech string quartet (Active 1891 - 1933)

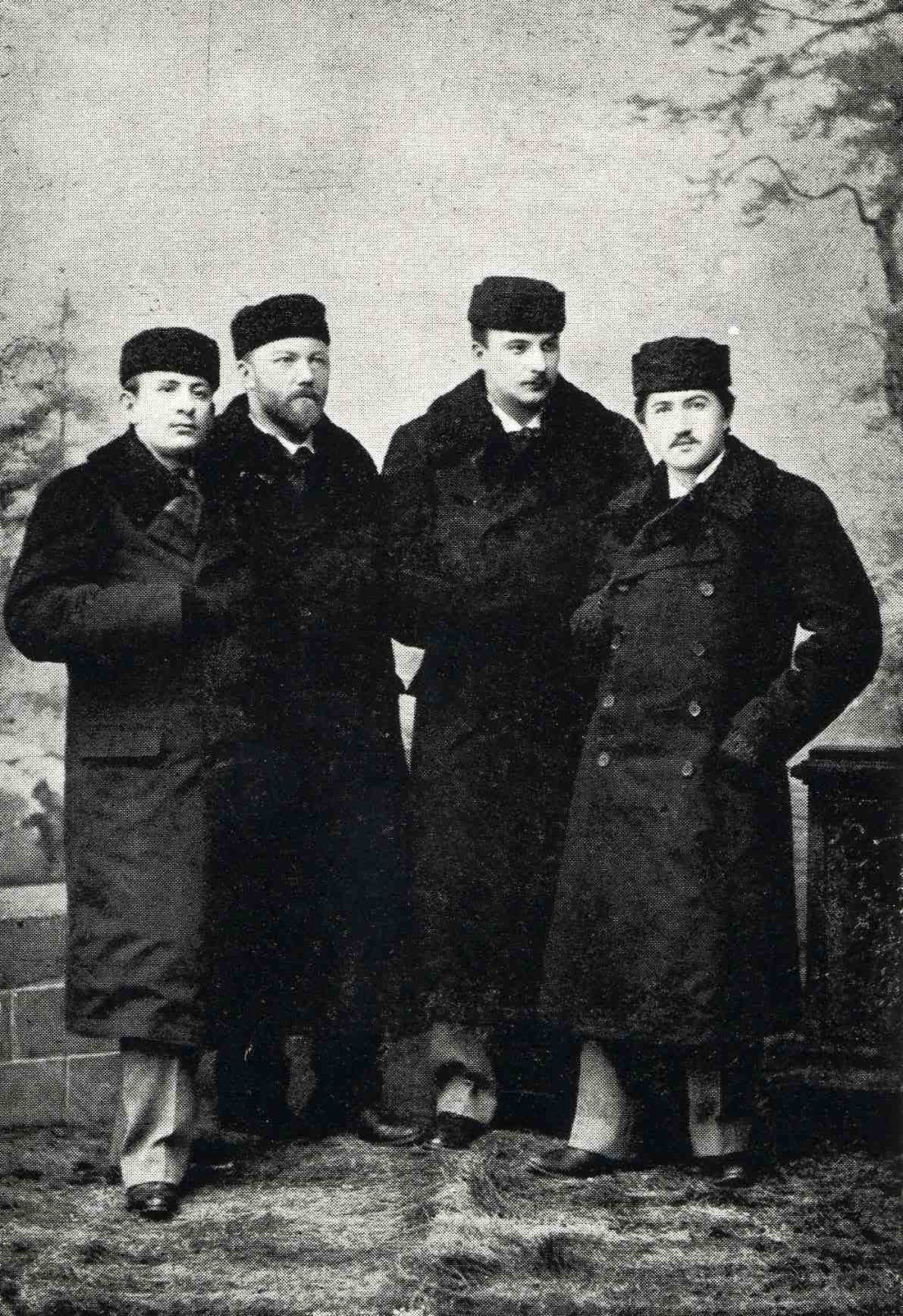
The Bohemian Quartet in 1895 - (L-R) Karel Hoffmann (1st violinist), Hanuš Wihan (violoncellist), Oskar Nedbal (violist), and Josef Suk (2nd violinist).

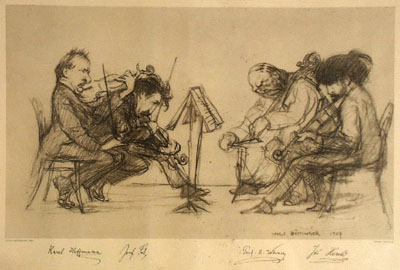
The Bohemian Quartet in 1907 by Hugo Boettinger

The Bohemian Quartet (Czech: České kvarteto; known as the Czech Quartet after 1918) was a Czech string quartet of international repute that was founded in 1891 and disbanded in 1933.

== Origins ==
The Quartet was founded in Prague by three pupils of Antonín Bennewitz (Karel Hoffmann, Josef Suk and Oskar Nedbal) and a pupil of Hanuš Wihan (Otto Berger); Bennewitz and Wihan were both teachers at the Prague Conservatory. Wihan had himself studied at Prague, and was cellist of the chamber quartet of Ludwig II in Munich, becoming Professor at Prague in 1888. He replaced his student Otto Berger as cellist in the quartet when Berger died prematurely. Wihan then directed the Quartet until 1913 when the strain of touring obliged him to retire from it and resume his teaching. His place was then taken by Ladislav Zelenka, who since 1911 had been playing with the Ševčík-Lhotský Quartet. In 1906, the violist Nedbal had run off with Hoffmann's wife; during the tour in England, his place was at short notice taken by Lionel Tertis and afterwards formally by Jiří Herold. The group made repeated tours in Europe, especially with the quartets of Dvořák and Smetana, and were noted for their warm tone and fiery rhythms. In 1922 the four members were appointed professors at the Prague Conservatory. The group disbanded with a concert on 4 December 1933, to honour Suk’s 60th birthday.

Many key contemporary works were written for and/or first performed by the Bohemian Quartet. Most notably, this included works by Antonín Dvořák and Leoš Janáček, such as Janáček's second string quartet, subtitled "Intimate Letters".

== Personnel ==
1st violin

- Karel Hoffmann

2nd violin

- Josef Suk (to 1933)
- Stanislav Novák (1933–34)

Viola

- Oskar Nedbal (to 1906)
- Jiří Herold (1906–1934)

Violoncello

- Otto Berger (to 1894)
- Hanuš Wihan (1894–1914)
- Ladislav Zelenka (1914–1934)

== Recordings ==
- Smetana: Quartet no. 1 in E minor (1876) (Polydor 78 rpm, 95076-95079). (as 'Bohemian Quartet')
- Smetana: Quartet no. 2 in D minor (1882) (Pathé 78 rpm X 86005-86008) (Private recording for Czech Academy).
- Dvořák: Quartet "no 6" (now no.12, 'American') in F major op 96 (Polydor 78 rpm, 95084-95086). (as 'Bohemian (Suk) Quartet')
- Dvořák: Quartet "no 3" (now no.10) in E flat major op 51, Dumka only (Polydor 78 rpm, 95087).(ditto)
- Suk: Quartet no 1 in B major op 11 (Polydor 78 rpm, 95080-95083).

(All recordings made 1928-29.)
