= Vasso Devetzi =

Greek pianist (1927–1987)

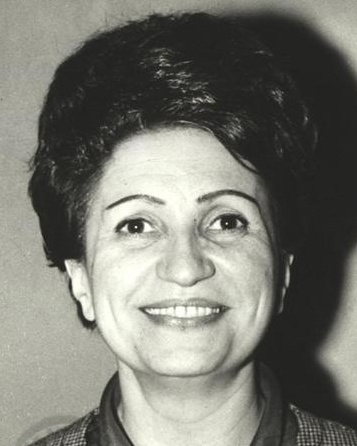
- Born: 9 September 1927; Thessaloniki, Greece
- Died: 1 November 1987 (aged 60); Neuilly-sur-Seine, France
- Occupation: Pianist
- Known for: Relationship with Maria Callas

Vasso Devetzi (Greek: Βάσω Δεβετζή; 9 September 1927 – 1 November 1987) was a Greek pianist. She was renowned for her work, but best known for her relationship with Greek opera singer Maria Callas.

== Biography ==
Vasso Devetzi was a Greek pianist. She was born on 9 September 1927 in Thessaloniki, Greece, and trained in Paris and Vienna under conductors such as David Oistrakh, Mstislav Rostropovich, and Rudolf Barshai. She was renowned for her skills on the piano. She first performed in the United States in 1970. When discussing her work with the Moscow Chamber Orchestra, performing six Piano Concertos by Bach, Marc Pincherle and Maurice Roy for Revue des deux Mondes praised her understanding of his work and the clarity of her technique. Albert Goldberg for Los Angeles Times praised her performance at Royce Hall, calling his review 'rave'. However, her February 1958 performance at Wigmore Hall was criticised in a review by The Musical Times, saying it lacked sensitivity.

Devetzi died of a heart attack on 1 November 1987, in Neuilly-sur-Seine, France.

=== Relationship with Maria Callas ===
Devetzi was close friends with opera singer Maria Callas. In 1975, Callas's former lover Aristotle Onassis was hospitalised in the American Hospital of Paris. Callas, greatly devastated, was comforted by Devetzi and updated on his condition by her, as her mother was being treated for cancer in the same hospital. Callas became severely depressed following his death. To help her, Devetzi took Callas to Halkidiki in 1976 for an eight-day holiday, following which Callas felt revitalised again.

Towards the end of Callas's life, she relied on Devetzi to deliver her sedatives, due to her addiction to such drugs. Callas died of a heart attack on 16 September 1977. While Devetzi was preparing for a concert at the Odeon of Herodes Atticus, she received news that Callas was dead. She revealed the news to the public while on stage.

After Callas's death, Devetzi ordered a quick cremation of her remains and arranged the funeral at St. Stephen's Greek Orthodox Cathedral, Paris. She was the executor of Callas's will and testament.

Devetzi allegedly pressured Callas's mother Evangelina and sister Jackie to give her $1 million to establish the Maria Callas Foundation. She then became president of it. However, Jackie allegedly claimed that the foundation did not exist, and that none of the funds were donated.
