= Jan Heřman =

Czech ice hockey player

- Born: February 16, 1984 (age 42) Plzeň, Czechoslovakia
- Height: 5 ft 9 in (175 cm)
- Weight: 185 lb (84 kg; 13 st 3 lb)
- Position: Forward
- Shoots: Left
- Czech Extraliga team: HC Plzeň
- Playing career: 2006–present

Jan Heřman (born 16 February 1984) is a Czech professional ice hockey player. He played with HC Plzeň in the Czech Extraliga during the 2010–11 season.

Heřman previously played for HC Sareza Ostrava, HC Berounští Medvědi, SK Horácká Slavia Třebíč, and HC Slovan Ústečtí Lvi.
