= Antonín Bennewitz =

Czech violinist (1833–1926)

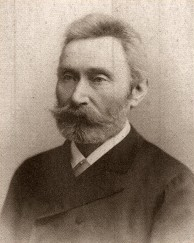
- Bennewitz in 1920

Background information
- Born: Antonín Josef Václav Benevic; 26 March 1833; Přívrat, Bohemia, Austrian Empire
- Died: 29 May 1926 (aged 93) Doksy, Czechoslovakia
- Genres: Classical
- Occupations: Musician; conductor; teacher
- Instrument: Violin

Antonín Bennewitz (also Anton Bennewitz; 26 March 1833 – 29 May 1926) was a Czech violinist, conductor and teacher. He was in a line of violinists that extended back to Giovanni Battista Viotti, and forward to Jan Kubelík and Wolfgang Schneiderhan.

== Life and career ==
He was born in Přívrat, Bohemia, as Antonín Josef Václav Benevic (his name is most often seen in the German rendering—Bennewitz) to a German father and a Czech mother. He studied under Moritz Mildner (Мильднер, Мориц) (Mořic Mildner: 1812–1865) at the Prague Conservatory from 1846 to 1852. He was subsequently engaged as first violinist at the Estates Theatre in Prague (1852–1861), as well as in Salzburg and Stuttgart.

On 3 December 1855, he participated in the first performance of Bedřich Smetana's Piano Trio in G minor, Op. 15, at the Prague Konvict Hall, with Smetana himself as pianist and Julius Goltermann as cellist. In 1859, he performed in Paris and Brussels.

In 1866, he became professor of violin in Prague. In 1876, he succeeded Mildner as leader of the Friedrich Pixis (Bedřich Vilém Pixis) quartet, which became known as the Bennewitz Quartet. He became director of the Prague Conservatory in 1882, serving until 1901, when he was succeeded by Antonín Dvořák. He was among the founders of the Kammermusikverein, whose nationalist ideals stimulated Smetana to write his String Quartet in E minor, From My Life.

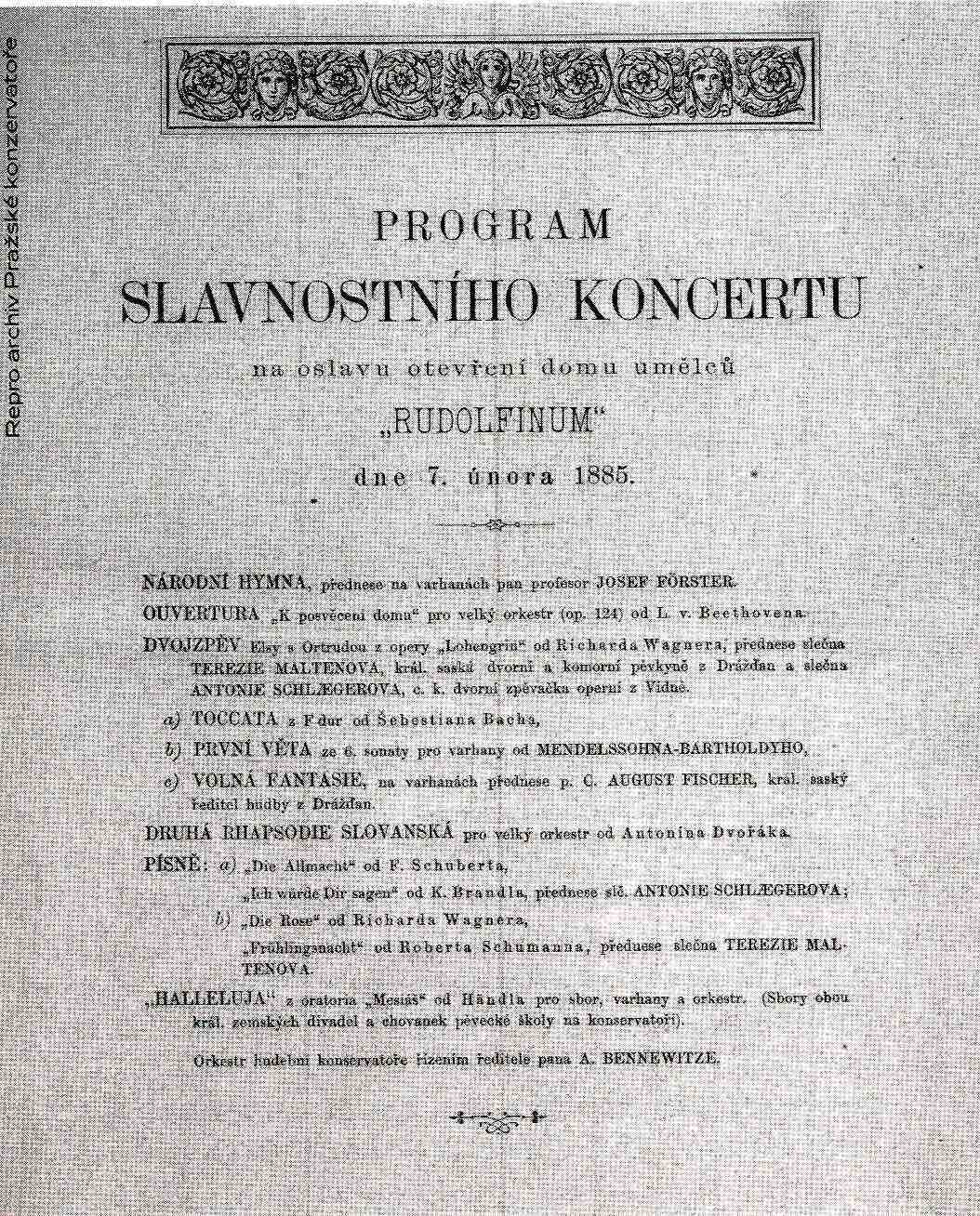
Program of the festive concert to the 1885 opening of the Rudolfinum in Prague, conducted by Bennewitz

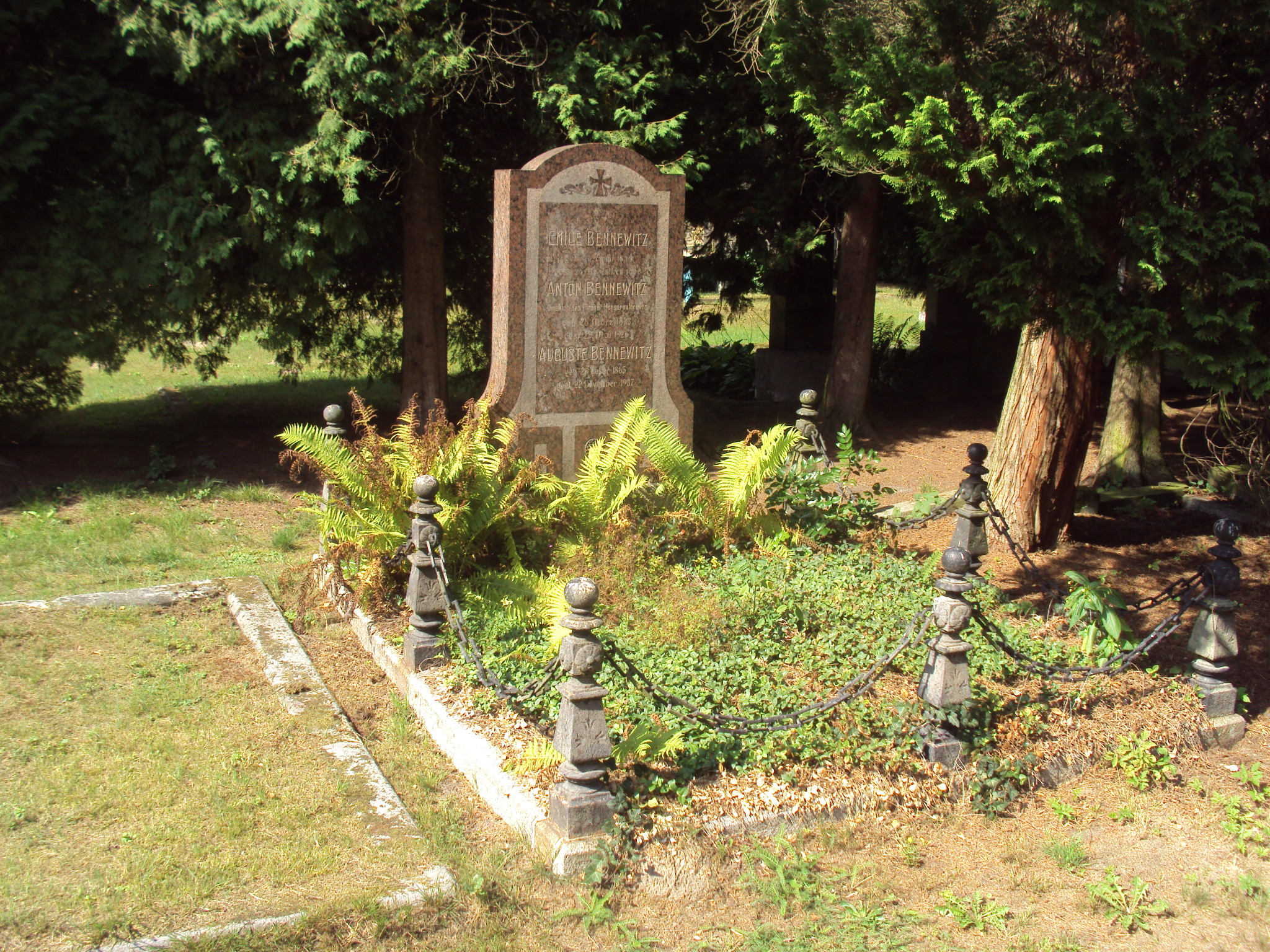
Bennewitz's grave in Doksy

On 25 February 1895, Bennewitz conducted the first complete performance of Josef Suk's Serenade for Strings in E flat, Op. 6, with the Prague Conservatory orchestra (two movements had been heard 14 months earlier, conducted by Suk himself).

On 3 June 1896, at the Prague Conservatory, Bennewitz conducted the first (semi-public) performances of Dvořák's symphonic poems The Noon Witch, The Water Goblin, and The Golden Spinning Wheel.

Bennewitz died on 29 May 1926, at the age of 93, in Doksy, where he is buried.

== Legacy ==
In 1998, a new Bennewitz Quartet, named in the musician's honour, was founded in Prague.

== Students ==
Bennewitz's pupils included František Ondříček (who premiered the Dvořák's violin concerto), Karel Halíř (who premiered the revised version of the Sibelius violin concerto), Otakar Ševčík, Franz Lehár, and three members of the Bohemian Quartet (later known as the Czech Quartet)—Karel Hoffmann and Josef Suk (violinists), and Oskar Nedbal (violist).
