= Oskar Nedbal =

Czech violinist and composer (1874–1930)

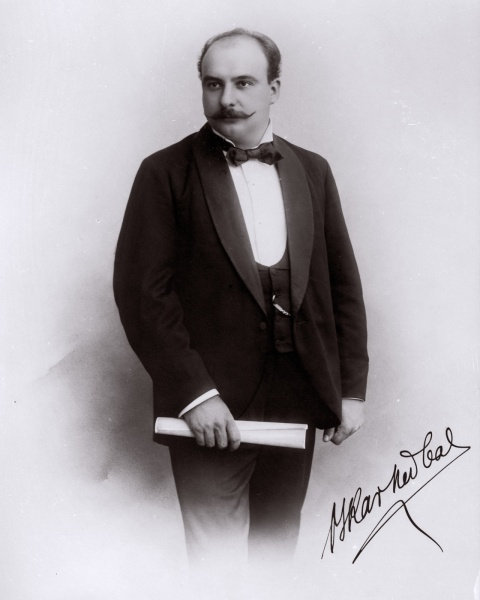

Background information
- Born: 26 March 1874; Tábor, Bohemia, Austria-Hungary
- Died: 24 December 1930 (aged 56) Zagreb, Kingdom of Yugoslavia
- Education: Prague Conservatory
- Genres: classical music
- Occupations: Composer; conductor; musician
- Instruments: viola

Oskar Nedbal (26 March 1874 – 24 December 1930) was a Czech violist, composer and conductor of classical music.

== Early life ==
Nedbal was born in Tábor in Bohemia, Austria-Hungary. He studied the violin at the Prague Conservatory under Antonín Bennewitz, theory under Karel Knittl and Karel Stecker, and composition with Antonín Dvořák.

== Career ==
In 1891 he founded the Bohemian String Quartet, later known as the Czech Quartet, which disbanded in 1933. The original members, alongside Nedbal on viola, were Karel Hoffmann, Josef Suk and Otto Berger.

He was principal conductor with the Czech Philharmonic Orchestra from 1896 to 1906. From 1907 until 1917 he lived in Vienna and conducted the Wiener Tonkünstler-Orchester.

A great admirer of his teacher Antonín Dvořák, Nedbal also paid homage to other composers. For example, in his 1910 composition, Romantic Piece, Op. 18 for cello and piano, Nedbal cleverly inserts a theme usually associated with Mozart, Ah, vous dirai-je, Maman.

His works include one (unsuccessful) opera, Jakob the Peasant (1919–1920), and the operettas Chaste Barbara (1910), Polenblut (1913), The Vineyard Bride (1916), and Beautiful Saskia (1917). Polenblut was adapted by Edgar Smith into the English-language operetta The Peasant Girl which played on Broadway in 1915.

From 1923 he was the general director of the Bratislava National Opera. In 1926 he conducted the premiere of Jan Levoslav Bella's opera, Wieland der Schmied in Bratislava.

== Death and legacy ==
Because of mounting personal debts, Nedbal committed suicide by jumping out of a window of the Zagreb Opera House on 24 December 1930.

In recent years, Nedbal's haunting Valse Triste featured in his ballet Der Faule Hans (The Tale of Simple Johnny) has been a favorite stand-alone encore piece of the Czech Philharmonic Orchestra. The waltz is also played on the piano at a key moment by one of the characters in Heimito von Doderer's novel of the inter-war years in Vienna, The Demons (Die Dämonen) (1956).

Since 2019, the Oskar Nedbal International Viola Competition has commemorated Nedbal's name.

== Selected works ==
Opera

- Sedlák Jakub (Jakub the Peasant; Le paysan Jakob) (1919–1920, revised 1928); libretto by L. Novák after Lope de Vega; premiere performance 13 October 1922 in Brno

Operettas

- Cudná Barbora (Chaste Barbara; Barbara the Chaste; Die keusche Barbara), Operetta in 3 acts (1910); libretto by Rudolf Bernauer, Leopold Jacobson and V. Stech; premiere performance 14 September 1910, Vinohrady Theatre, Prague
- Polská krev (Polish Blood; the original title was in German: Polenblut), Operetta in 3 acts (1913); libretto by Leo Stein; premiere performance 25 October 1913, Carltheater, Vienna
- Vinobraní (The Vineyard Bride; Die Winzerbraut), Operetta in 3 acts (1916); libretto by Leo Stein and Julius Wilhelm; premiere performance 11 February 1916, Theater an der Wien, Vienna
- Krásná Saskia (Beautiful Saskia; Die schöne Saskia), Operetta in 3 acts (1917); libretto by A. M. Willner and Heinz Reichert; premiere performance 16 November 1917, Carltheater, Vienna
- Eriwan, Operetta in 3 acts (1918); libretto by Felix Dörmann; premiere performance 29 November 1918, Komödienhaus (Colosseum), Vienna
- Mamselle Napoleon, Operetta in 1 act (1918, revised 1928); libretto by Emil Gölz and Arnold Gölz; premiere performance 21 January 1919, Die Hölle, Vienna
- Donna Gloria, Operetta in 3 acts (1925); libretto by Viktor Léon and Heinz Reichert; premiere performance 30 December 1925, Carltheater, Vienna
- Das Dorf ohne Männer, Operetta in 1 act (manuscript)
- Die Erntebraut; revision of Polská krev with a German libretto by Hermann Hermecke; premiere performance 1942, Admiralspalast, Berlin
- Podzimní píseň (Autumn Song; Le Chant d'automne); revision of Vinobraní with Czech libretto by Václav Špilar and Václav Mírovský; premiere performance 24 October 1930, Velká opereta, Prague

Ballets

- Pohádka o Honzovi (The Tale of Honza; Tale of Simple Johnny; Jean le paresseux; Der faule Hans), Ballet-Pantomime in 5 scenes (1901–1902); libretto by František Karel Hejda; premiere performance 24 January 1902, National Theatre, Prague
- Z pohádky do pohádky (From Fairy Tale to Fairy Tale; De conte en conte; Großmütterchens Märchenschätze) (1907); libretto by Ladislav Novák; premiere performance 25 January 1908, National Theatre, Prague
- Princezna Hyacinta (Princess Hyacinth) (1910); libretto by Ladislav Novák; premiere performance 1 September 1911, National Theatre, Prague
- Čertova babička (The Devil's Grandmother; Des Teufels Großmutter), Ballet-Pantomime in 3 scenes (1912); libretto by Karl van Zeska and Gertrude Stöhr; premiere performance 20 April 1912, Wiener Hofoper, Vienna
- Andersen, Fairy Tale Ballet in 7 scenes, a prologue and an epilogue (1912); libretto by Ladislav Novák and Jaroslav Kvapil; premiere performance 1 March 1914, Ronacher, Vienna
- Pevec lásky (Le Minnesänger) (1921); libretto by Ladislav Novák; premiere performance 9 April 1921 in Vienna (manuscript)
- Cikánské kouzlo (La magicien tzigane); libretto by V. Stech (manuscript, incomplete)
- Tajna; libretto by C. Sylva (manuscript, incomplete)

Incidental music

- Die Hermannsschlacht, Music for the play by Heinrich von Kleist (1914); premiere performance 10 December 1914, Burgtheater, Vienna

Orchestral

- Slavnostní pochod (Festival March; Festmarsch), Op. 3 (premiere 1894)
- Scherzo caprice (Scherzo capriccioso) in G major, Op. 5 (1892)
- Suite mignonne; orchestration (1920–1923) of the piano work Aus dem Kinderleben, Op. 15
- Unie (Union), Festival March (1928)
- Česká polka (Czech Polka) for string orchestra

Concertante

- Romance et sérénade for violin and piano (or orchestra), Op. 6 (1893)
- Romance for cello and orchestra

Chamber music

- Romance et sérénade for violin and piano (or orchestra), Op. 6 (1893)
- Sonata in B minor for violin and piano, Op. 9 (published 1896)
- Dvě skladby (2 Pieces) for cello and piano (or orchestra), Op. 12 (1899)

1. Romance in F major
2. Capriccio in F major

- Valse triste in G minor for string quartet (1907); from the ballet Pohádka o Honzovi
- Romantický kus (Pièce romantique) in D♭ major for cello and piano, Op. 18 (1910)
- Sonata in D major for violin and piano (manuscript)
- Fugue in D major for string quartet
- Prosba for 3 violins
- Romance for clarinet (manuscript)

Piano

- Variace na thema Antonína Dvořáka (Variations of a Theme of Dvořák), Op. 1
- Lettres intimes, 3 Pieces, Op. 7 (1894)
- Čtyři kusy (4 Pièces), Op. 8 (1894)

1. Barcarola
2. Valse petite
3. Impromptu
4. Valse caprice

- Silhouette, Op. 10 (1895)
- Humoreska in G major (1896)
- Aus vergangenen Zeiten, Op. 13 (1897); An orchestral version also exists in manuscript form.
- Z dětského života (Aus dem Kinderleben), Suite, Op. 15; orchestrated as Suite mignonne (1920–1923)
- Pohádka o smuku a štěstí (Fairy Tale of Grief and Joy; In Leid und Lust), Op. 16 (1905)
- Valses silhouettes, Op. 17 (1907)
- Sonata in D major (manuscript)
- Humoreske en do majeur sur un thème de Dvořák (manuscript)
- Reisebildchen (manuscript)
- Weihnachtsstimmung (published 1908)
- Preludium

Vocal

- 4 písně (4 Songs) for voice and piano, Op. 2 (published 1896)

1. Za svitu luny
2. Anděl strážce
3. Dívčí popěvek
4. Píseň v národním tónu

- 4 písně (4 Songs) for voice and piano, Op. 4 (1892)
- 4 písně (4 Songs) for voice and piano, Op. 11 (1896); words by Josef Václav Sládek

1. Sen
2. Oči
3. Dudák
4. Co na nebi je hvězdiček

- Píseň pro nová srdce (Chant pour les nouveaux cœurs) (manuscript)
- Militär und Volkslieder; words by Karel Dostál-Lutinov and Hornoff (manuscript)

Film scores

- Saint Wenceslas (Svatý Václav; 1929); directed by Jan Stanislav Kolár
