= Franz Strauss =

German composer and musician (1822–1905)

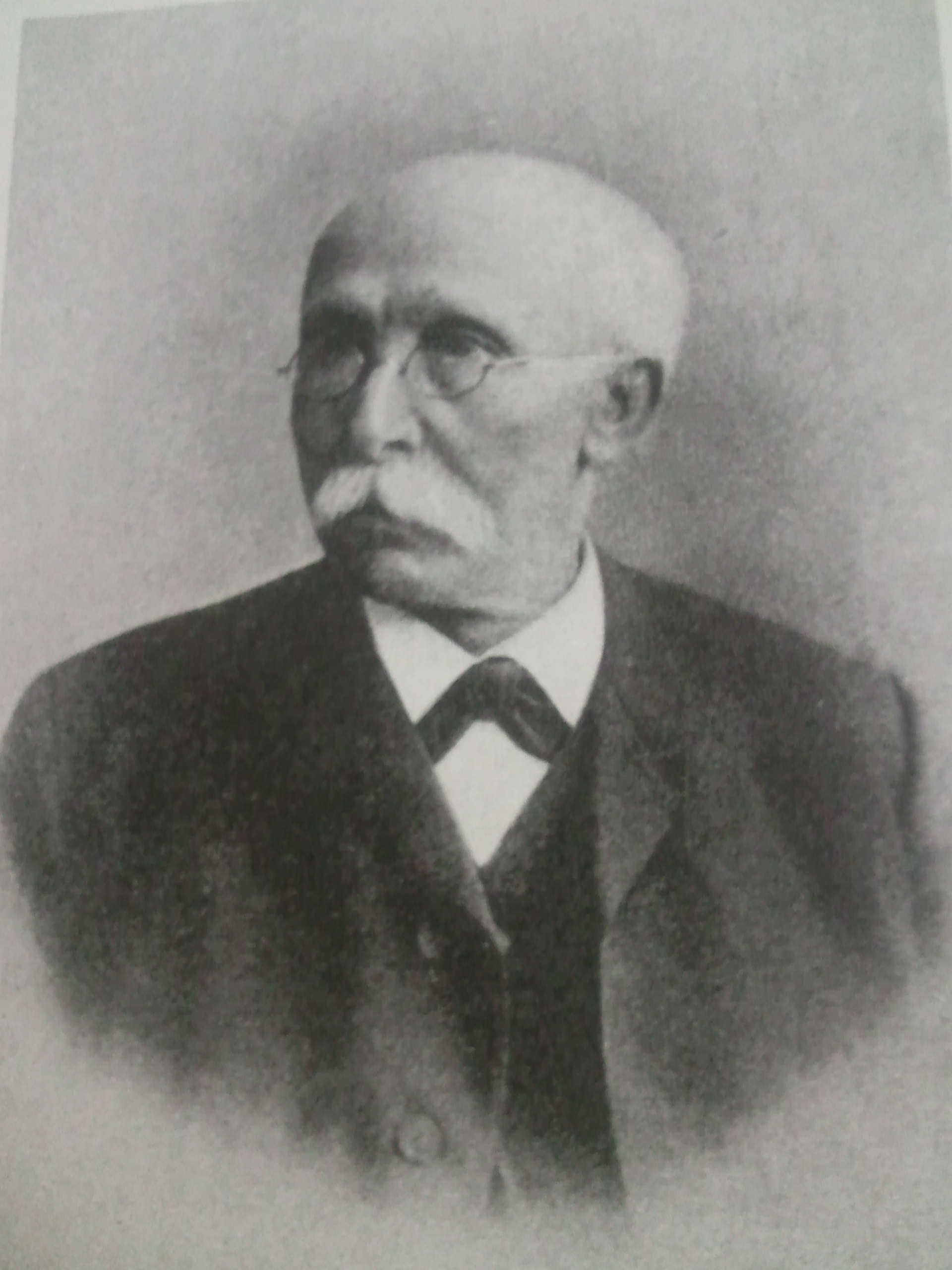
- Born: 26 February 1822; Parkstein, Kingdom of Bavaria, German Confederation
- Died: 31 May 1905 (aged 83); Munich, German Empire
- Occupations: Horn player and composer
- Spouse(s): Elise Seiff (1851–1854); Joséphine Pschorr (1863–death)
- Children: 4, including Richard Strauss

Franz Josef Strauss (26 February 1822 – 31 May 1905) was a German musician and composer. He was principal horn player of the Bavarian Court Opera for more than 40 years, a teacher at the Royal School of Music, Munich, a conductor, and accomplished performer on the guitar, clarinet and viola.

Strauss was the father of the composer Richard Strauss, on whose early musical development he was a great influence, steering his son to the classical and away from modern styles. As a composer, Strauss senior is remembered for his works for the horn. They include a concerto and numerous smaller works.

== Life and career ==
Strauss was born in Parkstein, Bavaria. His father, Johann Urban Strauss, was of unsteady character; his children were illegitimate and he left their upbringing to their mother, Maria Anna Kunigunde Walter. She was a member of a large and musical family, and her brother (Johann) Georg Walter undertook the boy's musical education. Georg taught Strauss to play the clarinet, guitar and a range of brass instruments. At the age of nine, Strauss was taken on as a pupil and player by another uncle, Franz Michael Walter, a military bandmaster. Georg's son Benno Walter was later to become the first violin teacher of Franz's son Richard and dedicatee of some of his works.

At the age of 15, through the influence of George Walter, Strauss was appointed to the private orchestra of Duke Max in Munich, where he remained for ten years. He gradually found that of all the instruments he could play, the horn suited him best. He started to compose for that instrument. Among his earliest compositions were a Romance, Les Adieux, and a Fantasy on Schubert's Sehnsuchtswalzer, both for horn and orchestra with alternative versions for horn and piano.

In 1847, Strauss became a member of the orchestra of the Bavarian Court Opera. In May 1851, he married Elise Maria Seiff, with whom he had a son and a daughter. The son died aged 10 months in 1852, and in 1854, Strauss's wife and daughter died of cholera. He lived a single life until 1863, when he married Josephine Pschorr (1837–1910), the daughter of a wealthy Munich brewer. They had two children: Richard Georg, born 1864, and Berta Johanna, born 1867.

Strauss's first horn concerto was premiered, with the composer playing the horn part, in 1865 and he remained greatly in demand as a soloist. The conductor Hans von Bülow called him "the Joachim of the horn". In 1871, he was appointed professor at the Royal School of Music; he was given the rank of Kammermusiker of the Bavarian court in 1873.

Franz Strauss, right, with his son Richard in 1901

Strauss's musical preferences were strongly classical; he loved the music of Mozart above all other, and also particularly admired Haydn, Beethoven, Schubert and Weber. He was not in sympathy with the new music of Wagner which his sovereign and employer, Ludwig II of Bavaria, assiduously promoted with productions at the Court Opera. Strauss's antipathy to modern music influenced the early development of his son, Richard, who began as a composer in a traditional vein, not finding himself drawn to modernism until he had left paternal influence behind him during his time at the Ludwig-Maximilians-Universität München.

Despite his personal distaste for Wagner, both as a man and a musician, Strauss's strict professionalism drove him to devote all his technical mastery to the important horn solos in Wagner's operas. He led the horn section in the premieres of Tristan und Isolde, Das Rheingold, and Die Walküre. Wagner said, "Strauss is a detestable fellow but when he blows his horn one cannot sulk with him."

In 1882, at the conductor Hermann Levi's invitation, Strauss played in the premiere of Parsifal at Bayreuth. After a bad attack of influenza, Strauss was unable to play the horn for 18 months, but continued to play in the Court Opera orchestra as a violist, in which capacity he took part in the first performance in Munich of Wagner's Tannhäuser.

In 1875, Strauss was elected conductor of the amateur orchestra, the "Wilde Gung'l", a post he held for 21 years. Among the players was his son, who learned the practicalities of orchestration there, and wrote some of his first compositions for the orchestra.

Strauss retired from the opera orchestra in 1889, though he continued his conducting and taught for some years thereafter. He died in Munich at the age of 83.
