= Leonard Bernstein =

American conductor and composer (1918–1990)

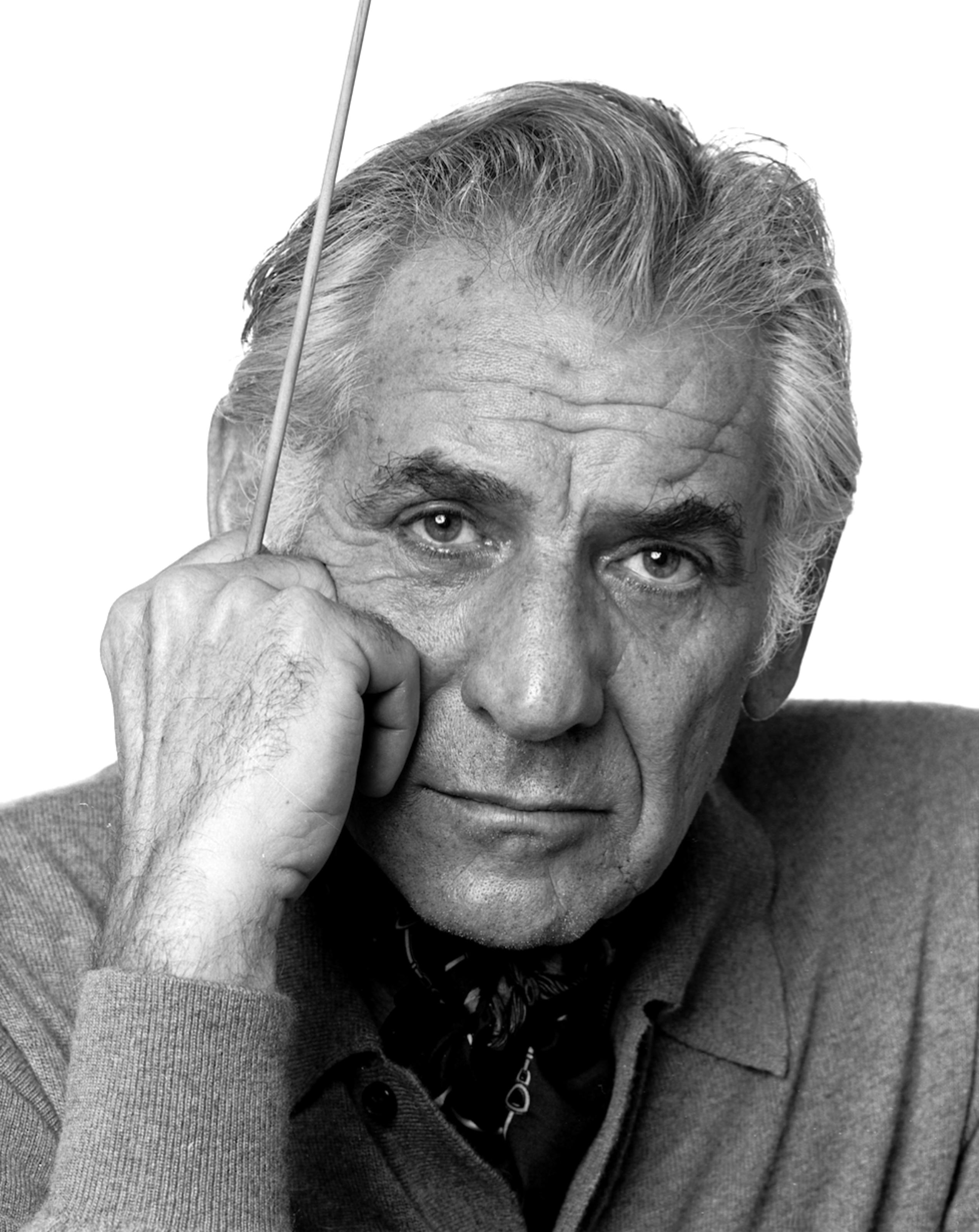
- Bernstein in 1977
- Born: Louis Bernstein; August 25, 1918; Lawrence, Massachusetts, U.S.
- Died: October 14, 1990 (aged 72); New York City, U.S.
- Burial place: Green-Wood Cemetery
- Education: Harvard University (BA); Curtis Institute of Music (Dip)
- Occupations: Conductor; composer; pianist; lecturer; author
- Years active: 1942–1990
- Works: List of compositions
- Spouse: Felicia Montealegre (m. 1951; died 1978)
- Children: 3
- Awards: Full list
- Website: www.leonardbernstein.com

Leonard Bernstein (/ˈbɜːrnstaɪn/ BURN-styne; born Louis Bernstein; August 25, 1918 – October 14, 1990) was an American conductor, composer, pianist, music educator, author, and humanitarian. Considered to be one of the most important conductors of his time, he was the first American-born conductor to receive international acclaim. Bernstein was "one of the most prodigiously talented and successful musicians in American history" according to music critic Donal Henahan. Bernstein's honors and accolades include seven Emmy Awards, two Tony Awards, and 16 Grammy Awards (including the Lifetime Achievement Award), as well as an Academy Award nomination. He received the Kennedy Center Honor in 1981.

As a composer, Bernstein wrote in many genres, including symphonic and orchestral music, ballet, film and theatre music, choral works, opera, chamber music, and pieces for the piano. Bernstein's works include the Broadway musical West Side Story, 1957, which continues to be regularly performed worldwide, and has been adapted into two (1961 and 2021) feature films, as well as three symphonies, Serenade (after Plato's Symposium) (1954) and Chichester Psalms (1965), the original score for Elia Kazan's On the Waterfront (1954), and theater works including On the Town (1944), Wonderful Town (1953), Candide (1956), and his Mass (1971).

Bernstein was the first American-born conductor to lead a major American symphony orchestra. He was music director of the New York Philharmonic and conducted the world's major orchestras, generating a legacy of audio and video recordings. Bernstein was also a critical figure in the modern revival of the music of Gustav Mahler, in whose music he was most interested. A skilled pianist, Bernstein often conducted piano concertos from the keyboard. He shared and explored classical music on television with a mass audience in national and international broadcasts, including Young People's Concerts with the New York Philharmonic.

Bernstein worked in support of civil rights; protested against the Vietnam War; advocated nuclear disarmament; raised money for HIV/AIDS research and awareness; championed Janis Ian at age 15 and her song about interracial love, "Society's Child", on his CBS television show; and engaged in multiple international initiatives for human rights and world peace. He conducted Mahler's Resurrection Symphony to mark the death of president John F. Kennedy, and in Israel at a concert, Hatikvah on Mt. Scopus, after the Six-Day War. The sequence of events was recorded for a documentary entitled Journey to Jerusalem. On Christmas Day, 1989, Bernstein conducted a performance of Beethoven's Symphony No. 9 in Berlin to celebrate the fall of the Berlin Wall. Less than a year later, in October 1990, he died of a heart attack in New York, aged 72.

== Early life and education ==
=== 1918–1935: Early life and family ===
Leonard Bernstein was born on August 25, 1918, in Lawrence, Massachusetts. He was of Jewish descent. His mother, Jennie (née Resnick), and his father, Samuel Joseph Bernstein, were both immigrants to the United States.

His father came from Rovensky Uyezd in the Russian Empire (present-day Ukraine). Samuel was born in 1892 in an ultra-Orthodox Jewish shtetl and wanted to become a rabbi, but after he was called up for military service, he left Russia for the United States in 1908 and initially worked at the Fulton Fish Market in New York City. Jennie was born in Russia in 1898 and arrived in the United States in 1905; she later worked at the woolen mills in Lawrence.

His grandmother insisted that his first name officially be Louis, but his parents always called him Leonard. He legally changed his name to Leonard when he was 16. To his friends and many others, he was simply known as "Lenny".

His mother had moved in with her parents, in Lawrence, toward the end of her pregnancy with Leonard, her first child. Since he was sickly as an infant, he stayed there until he was strong enough for him and his mother to join his father in Boston. There, the boy attended the William Lloyd Garrison School and then the Boston Latin School, where he and classmate Lawrence F. Ebb wrote the class song. When Leonard was 15, the family moved to nearby Newton, Massachusetts.

Samuel became a wealthy man as the owner of the Samuel J. Bernstein Hair Company, which, in the 1920s and 1930s, held the exclusive distribution rights for the Frederick's Permanent Wave Machine.

In Leonard's early years, his main exposure to music was on Friday nights at Congregation Mishkan Tefila in the Roxbury neighborhood of Boston. Its innovative rabbi, Herman H. Rubenovitz, introduced organ music and a mixed choir to New England's Jewish congregations. He also recruited a distinguished European cantor, Izso Glickstein, whom Leonard described as his favorite cantor. Glickstein was Burton Bernstein's godfather. Burton described Glickstein as a cantor who could have been an opera singer.

When Bernstein was 10 years old, his Aunt Clara, Samuel's sister, deposited her upright piano at their house. Young Bernstein asked for lessons and subsequently studied with a variety of piano teachers, including Helen Coates, who would later become his secretary. In the summers, the Bernstein family would retreat to their vacation home in Sharon, Massachusetts, where Leonard conscripted all the neighborhood children to put on shows, ranging from Bizet's Carmen to Gilbert and Sullivan's H.M.S. Pinafore. He and his two younger siblings, Shirley and Burton, remained close their entire lives.

Samuel initially opposed Leonard's interest in music and attempted to discourage it by refusing to pay for his son's piano lessons. So, Leonard took to giving lessons to young people in his neighborhood. One of his students, Sid Ramin, would become a beloved lifelong friend and Bernstein's orchestrator (along with Irwin Kostal) for West Side Story.

Eventually, Samuel came around, taking his son to orchestral concerts in his teenage years and ultimately supporting his music studies, as well. In May 1932, Leonard attended his first orchestral concert with the Boston Pops, conducted by Arthur Fiedler. There, Bernstein first heard Ravel's Boléro, which impressed him greatly.

On March 30, 1932, Bernstein played Brahms's Rhapsody in G minor at his first public piano performance in Susan Williams's studio recital at the New England Conservatory of Music. Two years later, he made his debut as a soloist with an orchestra, playing Grieg's Piano Concerto in A minor with the Boston Public School Orchestra.

Among his strong musical influences was George Gershwin. When news came of Gershwin's death, in July 1937, Bernstein, then a music counselor at a summer camp, interrupted lunch in the mess hall and played Gershwin's second Prelude as a memorial.

=== 1935–1941: College years ===
Harvard University

In 1935, Bernstein enrolled at Harvard College, where he studied music with, among others, composers Edward Burlingame Hill and Walter Piston. Bernstein's first extant composition, Psalm 148, for voice and piano, is dated 1935. He majored in music with a senior thesis titled "The Absorption of Race Elements into American Music" (1939; reproduced in his book Findings). One of Bernstein's intellectual influences at Harvard was aesthetics professor David Prall, and one of his friends at the school was future philosopher Donald Davidson. Bernstein wrote and conducted the musical score for Davidson's production of the Aristophanes play The Birds, performed in the original Greek. Bernstein recycled some of this music in future works. While a student, Bernstein composed for the Harvard Glee Club and was briefly its president while also serving as the unpaid pianist for Harvard Film Society's silent film presentations.

Bernstein mounted a student production of The Cradle Will Rock, directing its action from the piano as the composer Marc Blitzstein had done at the premiere. Blitzstein, who attended the performance, subsequently became a close friend and mentor to Bernstein. As a sophomore at Harvard, Bernstein met the conductor Dimitri Mitropoulos, who was an influence on Bernstein's eventual decision to become a conductor. Mitropoulos invited Bernstein to come to Minneapolis for the 1940–41 season to be his assistant, but the plan fell through because of union issues. In 1937, Bernstein sat next to Aaron Copland at a dance recital at Town Hall in New York City. Copland invited Bernstein to his birthday party afterwards, where Bernstein impressed the guests by playing Copland's challenging Piano Variations. Although he was never a formal student of Copland's, Bernstein regularly sought his advice, often citing him as "the closest thing to a composition teacher [Bernstein] ever had." Bernstein graduated from Harvard in 1939 with a Bachelor of Arts, cum laude.

Curtis Institute of Music

After graduating from Harvard, Bernstein enrolled at the Curtis Institute of Music in Philadelphia. At Curtis, Bernstein studied conducting with Fritz Reiner; piano with Isabelle Vengerova; orchestration with Randall Thompson; counterpoint with Richard Stöhr; and score reading with Renée Longy-Miquelle. In 1940, Bernstein attended the inaugural year of the Berkshire Music Center, the Boston Symphony Orchestra's summer home. Bernstein studied conducting with the BSO's music director, Serge Koussevitzky, who became a profound lifelong inspiration to Bernstein. He became Koussevitzky's conducting assistant at Tanglewood and later dedicated his Symphony No. 2: The Age of Anxiety to Koussevitzky. One of Bernstein's classmates, both at Curtis and at Tanglewood, was Lukas Foss, who remained a lifelong friend and colleague. Bernstein returned to Tanglewood nearly every summer for the rest of his life to teach and conduct the young music students. Bernstein received a diploma in conducting from Curtis in 1941.

== Career ==
=== 1940s: Rise to prominence ===
Soon after he left Curtis, Bernstein moved to New York City where he lived in various apartments in Manhattan. Bernstein supported himself by coaching singers, teaching piano, and playing the piano for dance classes in Carnegie Hall. He found work with Harms-Witmark, transcribing jazz and pop music and publishing his work under the pseudonym "Lenny Amber". (Bernstein means "amber" in German.)

Bernstein briefly shared an apartment in Greenwich Village with his friend Adolph Green. Green was then part of a satirical music troupe called The Revuers, featuring Betty Comden and Judy Holliday. With Bernstein sometimes providing piano accompaniment, The Revuers often performed at the legendary jazz club the Village Vanguard. On April 21, 1942, Bernstein performed the premiere of his first published work, Sonata for Clarinet and Piano, with clarinetist David Glazer at the Institute of Modern Art in Boston.

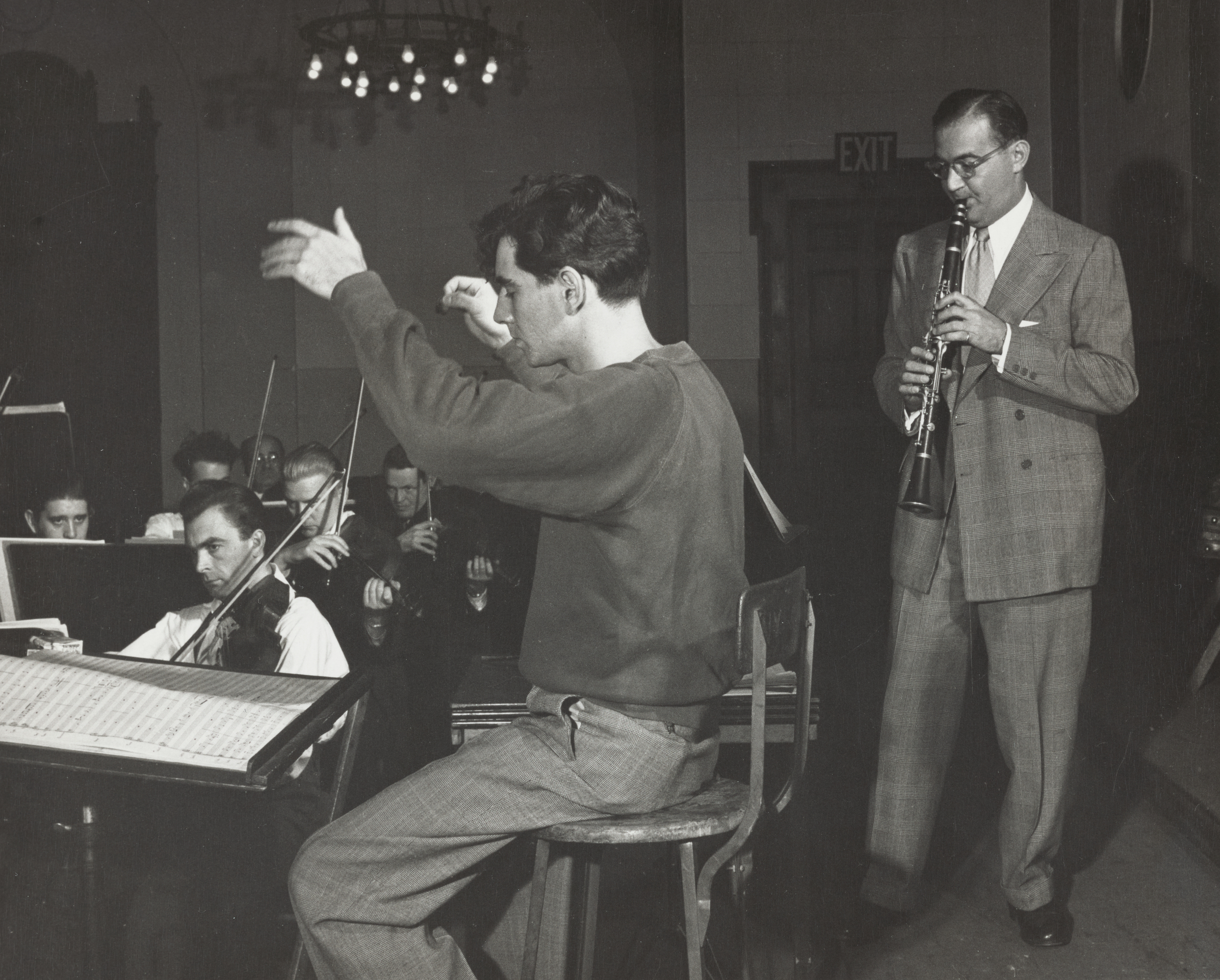
Leonard Bernstein and Benny Goodman in rehearsal, ca. 1940–1949

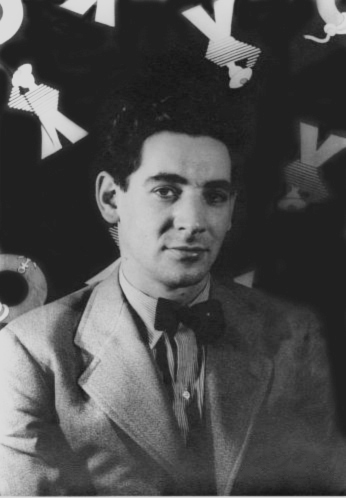
Photo of Bernstein by Carl Van Vechten (1944)

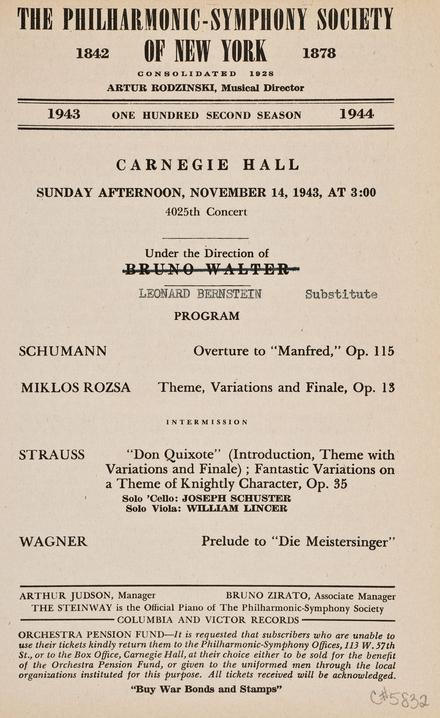
Carnegie Hall playbill, November 14, 1943 Radio announcement:

==== New York Philharmonic conducting debut ====
Bernstein would later make his New York Philharmonic conducting debut. On November 14, 1943, having recently been appointed assistant conductor to Artur Rodziński of the New York Philharmonic, Bernstein made his major conducting debut at short notice—and without any rehearsal—after guest conductor Bruno Walter came down with the flu. The challenging program included works by Robert Schumann, Miklós Rózsa, Richard Wagner, and Richard Strauss.

The next day, The New York Times carried the story on its front page and remarked in an editorial, "It's a good American success story. The warm, friendly triumph of it filled Carnegie Hall and spread far over the air waves." Many newspapers throughout the country carried the story, which, in combination with the concert's live national CBS Radio Network broadcast, propelled Bernstein to instant fame. Over the next two years, Bernstein made conducting debuts with ten different orchestras in the United States and Canada, greatly broadening his repertoire and initiating a lifelong frequent practice of conducting concertos from the piano.

On January 28, 1944, Bernstein conducted the premiere of his Symphony No. 1: Jeremiah with the Pittsburgh Symphony Orchestra and soloist Jennie Tourel. In the fall of 1943, Bernstein and Jerome Robbins began work on their first collaboration, Fancy Free, a ballet about three young sailors on leave in wartime New York City. Fancy Free premiered on April 18, 1944, with the Ballet Theatre (now the American Ballet Theatre) after completing the score only 8 days earlier at the old Metropolitan Opera House, with scenery by Oliver Smith and costumes by Kermit Love.

Bernstein and Robbins decided to expand the ballet into a musical and invited Comden and Green to write the book and lyrics. On the Town opened on Broadway's Adelphi Theatre on December 28, 1944. The show resonated with audiences during World War II, and it broke race barriers on Broadway: Japanese-American dancer Sono Osato in a leading role; a multiracial cast dancing as mixed race couples; and a Black concertmaster, Everett Lee, who eventually took over as music director of the show. On the Town became an MGM motion picture in 1949, starring Gene Kelly, Frank Sinatra, and Jules Munshin as the three sailors. Only part of Bernstein's score was used in the film and additional songs were provided by Roger Edens.

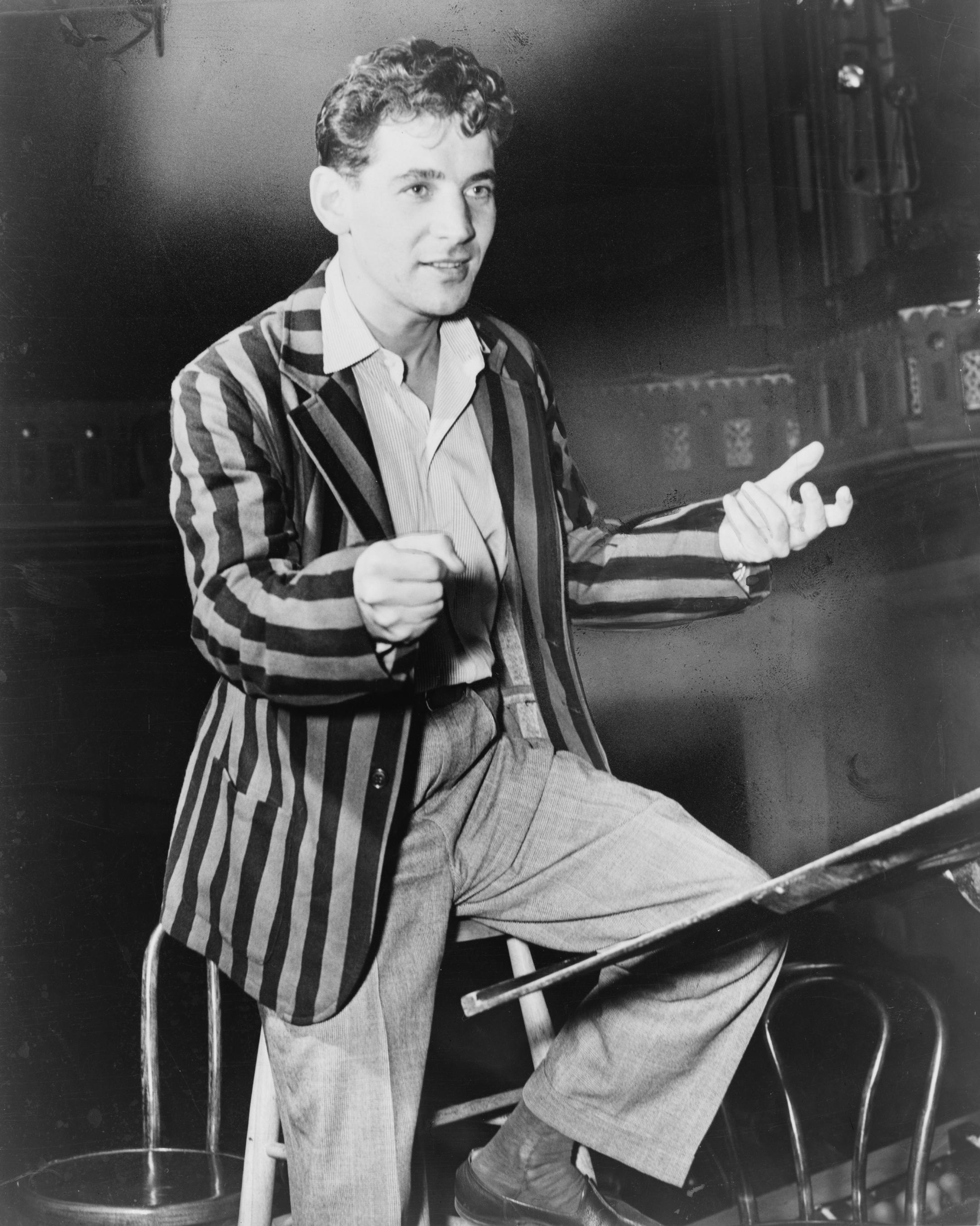
Bernstein conducting the New York City Symphony (1945)

From 1945 to 1947, Bernstein was the music director of the New York City Symphony, which had been founded the previous year by the conductor Leopold Stokowski. The orchestra (with support from Mayor Fiorello La Guardia) had modern programs and affordable tickets. In 1946, Bernstein made his overseas debut with the Czech Philharmonic at the inaugural Prague Spring International Music Festival. He also recorded Ravel's Piano Concerto in G major as soloist and conductor with the Philharmonia Orchestra. On July 4, 1946, Bernstein conducted the European premiere of Fancy Free with the Ballet Theatre at the Royal Opera House in London. On August 6 he conducted opera professionally for the first time, with the American premiere of Benjamin Britten's Peter Grimes at Tanglewood, commissioned by Koussevitzky. That same year, Arturo Toscanini invited Bernstein to guest conduct two concerts with the NBC Symphony Orchestra, one of which featured Bernstein as soloist in Ravel's Piano Concerto in G major.

==== Israel Philharmonic Orchestra, television debut and Tanglewood ====
Leonard Bernstein (photo with dedication from 1953)

In 1947, Bernstein conducted in Tel Aviv for the first time, beginning a lifelong association with the Israel Philharmonic Orchestra, then known as the Palestine Symphony Orchestra. The next year, he conducted an open-air concert for Israeli troops at Beersheba in the middle of the desert during the Arab-Israeli war. In 1957, he conducted the inaugural concert of the Mann Auditorium in Tel Aviv. In 1967, he conducted a concert on Mount Scopus to commemorate the Reunification of Jerusalem, featuring Mahler's Symphony No. 2 and Mendelssohn's Violin Concerto with soloist Isaac Stern. The city of Tel Aviv added his name to the Habima Square (Orchestra Plaza) in the center of the city. On December 10, 1949, Bernstein made his first television appearance as conductor with the Boston Symphony Orchestra at Carnegie Hall. The concert, which included an address by Eleanor Roosevelt, celebrated the first anniversary of the United Nations General Assembly's ratification of the Universal Declaration of Human Rights, and included the premiere of Aaron Copland's Preamble for a Solemn Occasion with Laurence Olivier narrating text from the UN Charter. The concert was televised by NBC Television Network. In April 1949, Bernstein performed as piano soloist in the world premiere of his Symphony No. 2: The Age of Anxiety with Koussevitzy conducting the Boston Symphony Orchestra. On December 2, 1949, Bernstein conducted the world premiere of the Messiaen's Turangalîla-Symphonie, with the Boston Symphony Orchestra and the New York premiere in Carnegie Hall on the afternoon of December 10. Part of the rehearsal for the concert was recorded and released by the orchestra. When Koussevitzky died in 1951, Bernstein became head of the orchestra and conducting departments at Tanglewood.

=== 1950s: Career expansion and West Side Story ===
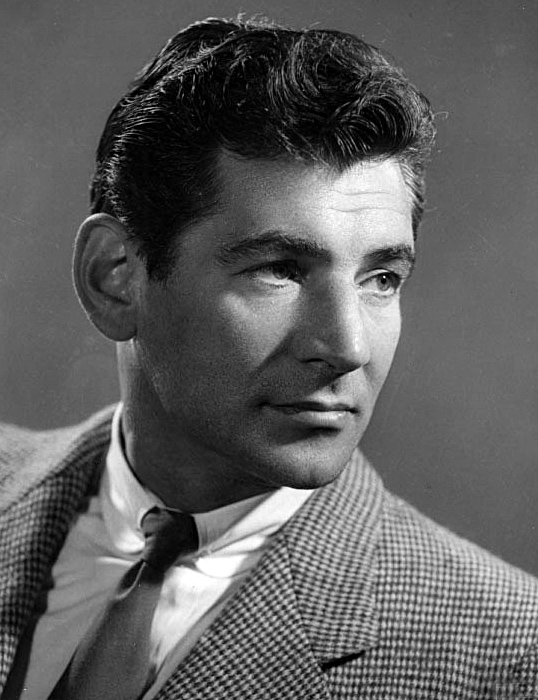
Bernstein, c. 1950s

The 1950s comprised the most active years of Bernstein's career. He created five new works for the Broadway stage, composed several symphonic works and an iconic film score, and was appointed music director of the New York Philharmonic with whom he toured the world, including concerts behind the Iron Curtain. Bernstein also harnessed the power of television to expand his educational reach, and he married and started a family. In 1950, Bernstein composed incidental music for a Broadway production of J. M. Barrie's play Peter Pan. The production, which opened on Broadway on April 24, 1950, starred Jean Arthur as Peter Pan and Boris Karloff in the dual roles of George Darling and Captain Hook. The show ran for 321 performances.

In 1951, Bernstein composed Trouble in Tahiti, a one-act opera in seven scenes with an English libretto by the composer. The opera portrays the troubled marriage of a couple whose idyllic suburban post-war environment belies their inner turmoil. Ironically, Bernstein wrote most of the opera while on his honeymoon in Mexico with his wife, Felicia Montealegre-Cohn. Bernstein was a visiting music professor at Brandeis University from 1951 to 1956. In 1952, he created the Brandeis Festival of the Creative Arts, where he conducted the premiere of Trouble in Tahiti on June 12 of that year. The NBC Opera Theatre subsequently presented the opera on television in November 1952. It opened on Broadway at the Playhouse Theatre on April 19, 1955, and ran for six weeks. Three decades later, Bernstein wrote a second opera, A Quiet Place (1983), which picked up the story and characters of Trouble in Tahiti in a later period.

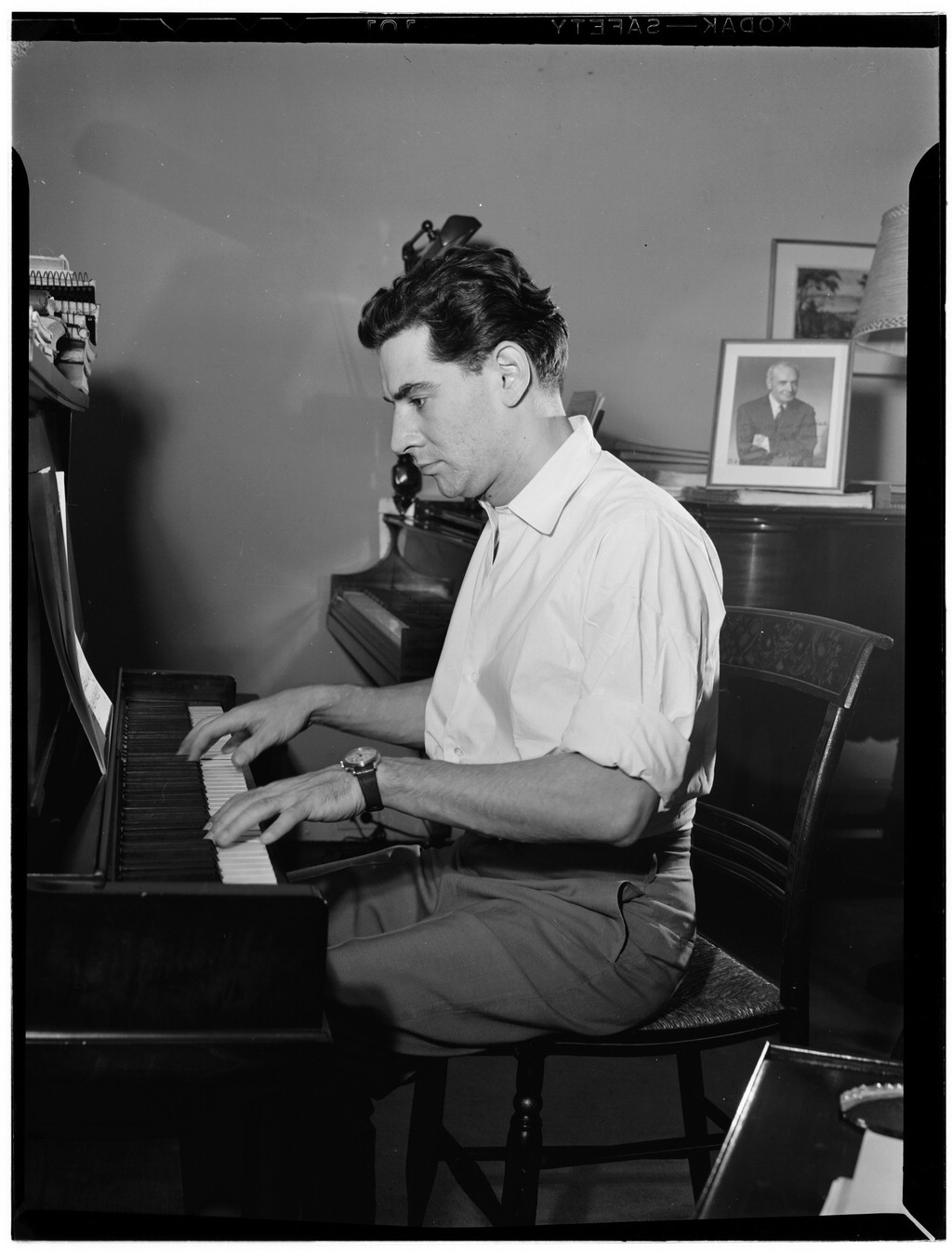
Bernstein collaborated with Comden and Green on Wonderful Town

Wonderful Town (1953)

In 1953, Bernstein wrote the score for the musical Wonderful Town on very short notice, with a book by Joseph A. Fields and Jerome Chodorov and lyrics by Betty Comden and Adolph Green. Like the 1940 play, directed on Broadway by George S. Kaufman, it is based on the autobiographical short stories, collectively titled My Sister Eileen, that were written by Ruth McKenney and published in the early 1930s by The New Yorker. They tell the story of two sisters from Ohio who move to New York City and seek success from their squalid basement apartment in Greenwich Village. Wonderful Town opened on Broadway on February 25, 1953, at the Winter Garden Theatre, starring Rosalind Russell in the role of Ruth Sherwood, Edie Adams as Eileen Sherwood, and George Gaynes as Robert Baker. It won five Tony Awards, including Best Musical and Best Actress.

Candide (1956)

In the three years leading up to Bernstein's appointment as music director of the New York Philharmonic, Bernstein was simultaneously working on the scores for two Broadway shows. The first of the two was the operetta-style musical Candide. Lillian Hellman originally brought Bernstein her idea of adapting Voltaire's novella. The original collaborators on the show were book writer John Latouche and lyricist Richard Wilbur. Candide opened on Broadway on December 1, 1956, at the Martin Beck Theatre, in a production directed by Tyrone Guthrie. Anxious about the parallels Hellman had deliberately drawn between Voltaire's story and the ongoing hearings conducted by the House Un-American Activities Committee, Guthrie persuaded the collaborators to cut their most incendiary sections prior to opening night. While the production was a box office disaster, running for only two months for a total of 73 performances, the cast album became a cult classic, which kept Bernstein's score alive. There have been several revivals, with modifications to improve the book. The elements of the music that have remained best known and performed over the decades are the Overture, which quickly became one of the most frequently performed orchestral compositions by a 20th century American composer; the coloratura aria "Glitter and Be Gay", which Barbara Cook sang in the original production; and the grand finale "Make Our Garden Grow".

West Side Story (1957)

The other musical Bernstein was writing simultaneously with Candide was West Side Story. Bernstein collaborated with director and choreographer Jerome Robbins, book writer Arthur Laurents, and lyricist Stephen Sondheim. The story is an updated retelling of Shakespeare's Romeo and Juliet, set in the mid-1950s in the slums of New York City's Upper West Side. The Romeo character, Tony, is affiliated with the Jets gang, who are of white Northern European descent. The Juliet character is Maria, who is connected to the Sharks gang, recently arrived from Puerto Rico. The original Broadway production opened at the Winter Garden Theatre on September 26, 1957, and ran 732 performances. Robbins won the Tony Award for Best Choreographer, and Oliver Smith won the Tony for Best Scenic Designer.

Bernstein's score for West Side Story blends "jazz, Latin rhythms, symphonic sweep and musical-comedy conventions in groundbreaking ways for Broadway". It was orchestrated by Sid Ramin and Irwin Kostal following detailed instructions from Bernstein. The dark theme, sophisticated music, extended dance scenes, and focus on social problems marked a turning point in musical theatre. In 1960, Bernstein prepared a suite of orchestral music from the show, titled Symphonic Dances from West Side Story, which continues to be popular with orchestras worldwide. A 1961 United Artists film adaptation, directed by Robert Wise and Robbins, starred Natalie Wood as Maria and Richard Beymer as Tony. The film won ten Academy Awards, including Best Picture and a ground-breaking Best Supporting Actress award for Puerto Rican-born Rita Moreno playing the role of Anita. A film adaptation directed by Steven Spielberg opened in 2021.

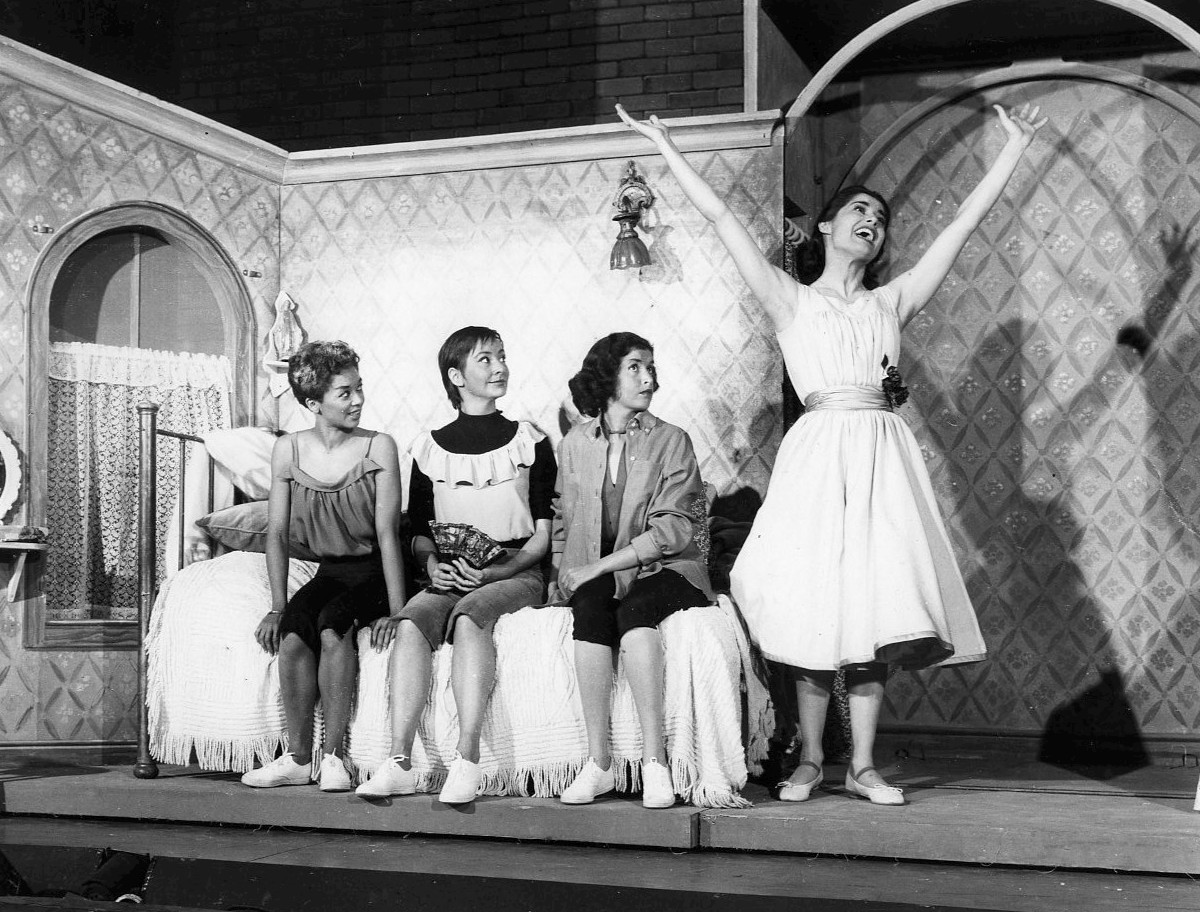
L–R: Elizabeth Taylor, Carmen Gutierrez, Marilyn Cooper, and Carol Lawrence from the original Broadway cast sing "I Feel Pretty" (1957)

In addition to Bernstein's compositional activity for the stage, he wrote a symphonic work, Serenade after Plato's "Symposium" (1954); the score On the Waterfront (1954); and Prelude, Fugue and Riffs, composed in 1949, but only premiered in 1955, for jazz big band and solo clarinet. In 1953, Bernstein became the first American conductor to appear at La Scala in Milan, conducting Cherubini's Medea, with Maria Callas in the title role. Callas and Bernstein reunited at La Scala to perform Bellini's La sonnambula in 1955. On November 14, 1954, Bernstein presented the first of his television lectures for the CBS Television Network arts program Omnibus. The live lecture, entitled "Beethoven's Fifth Symphony", involved Bernstein explaining the symphony's first movement with the aid of musicians from the "Symphony of the Air" (formerly NBC Symphony Orchestra). The program featured manuscripts from Beethoven's own hand, as well as a giant painting of the first page of the score covering the studio floor. Six more Omnibus lectures followed from 1955 to 1961 (later on ABC and then NBC) covering a broad range of topics: jazz, conducting, American musical comedy, modern music, J. S. Bach, and grand opera.

Music director of the New York Philharmonic

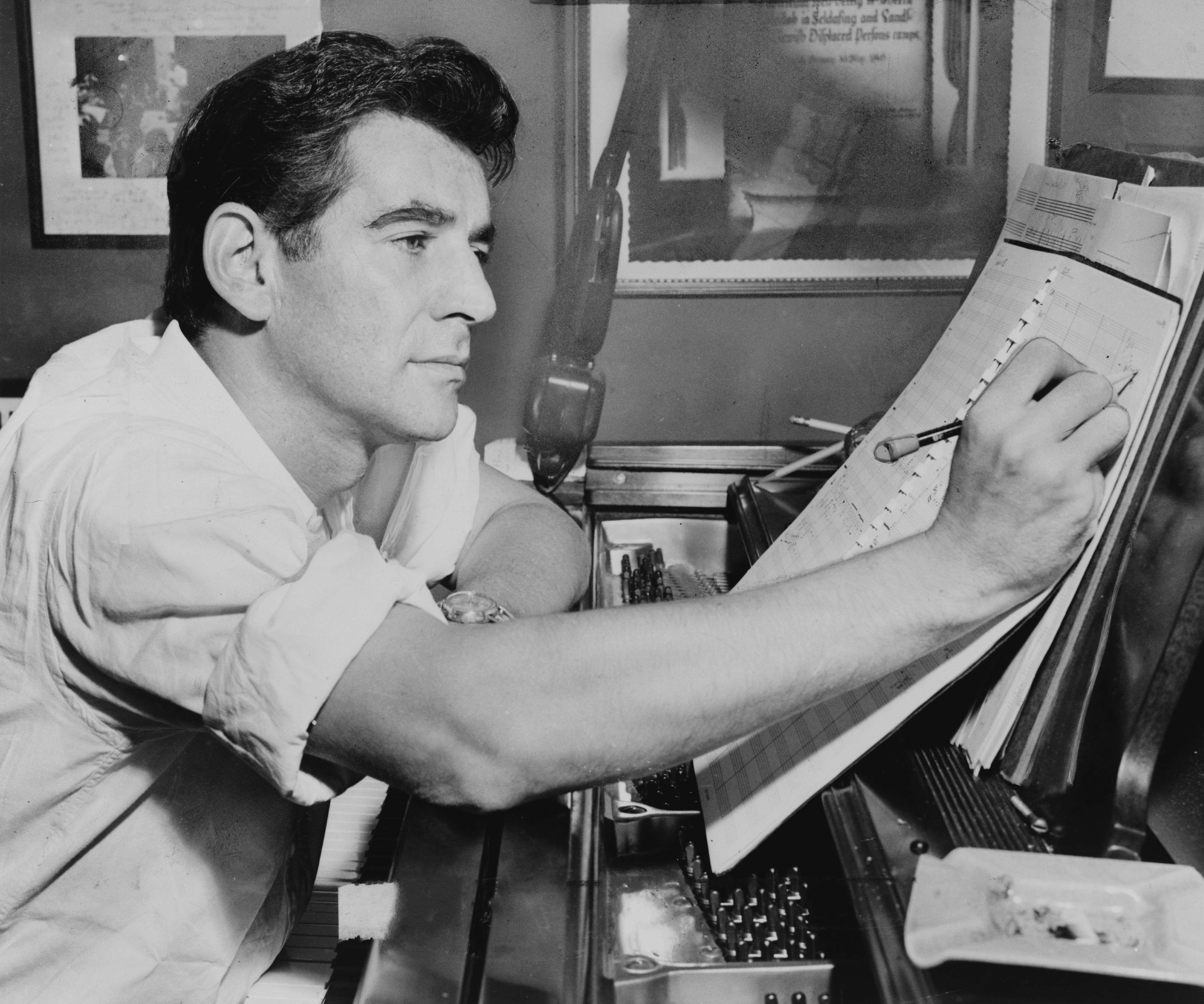
Bernstein at the piano, annotating a musical score, 1955

Bernstein was appointed the music director of the New York Philharmonic in 1957, sharing the post jointly with Dimitri Mitropoulos until he took sole charge in 1958. Bernstein held the music directorship until 1969 when he was appointed "Laureate Conductor". He continued to conduct and make recordings with the orchestra for the rest of his life. Bernstein's television teaching took a quantum leap when, as the new music director of the New York Philharmonic, he put the orchestra's traditional Saturday afternoon Young People's Concerts on the CBS Television Network. Millions of viewers of all ages and around the world enthusiastically embraced Bernstein and his engaging presentations about classical music. Bernstein often presented talented young performers on the broadcasts. Many of them became celebrated in their own right, including conductors Claudio Abbado and Seiji Ozawa; flutist Paula Robison; and pianist André Watts. From 1958 until 1972, the 53 Young People's Concerts comprised the most influential series of music education programs ever produced on television. They were highly acclaimed by critics and won numerous Emmy Awards.

Some of Bernstein's scripts, all of which he wrote himself, were released in book form and on records. A recording of Humor in Music was awarded a Grammy award for Best Documentary or Spoken Word Recording (other than comedy) in 1961. The programs were shown in many countries around the world, often with Bernstein dubbed into other languages, and the concerts were later released on home video by Kultur Video.

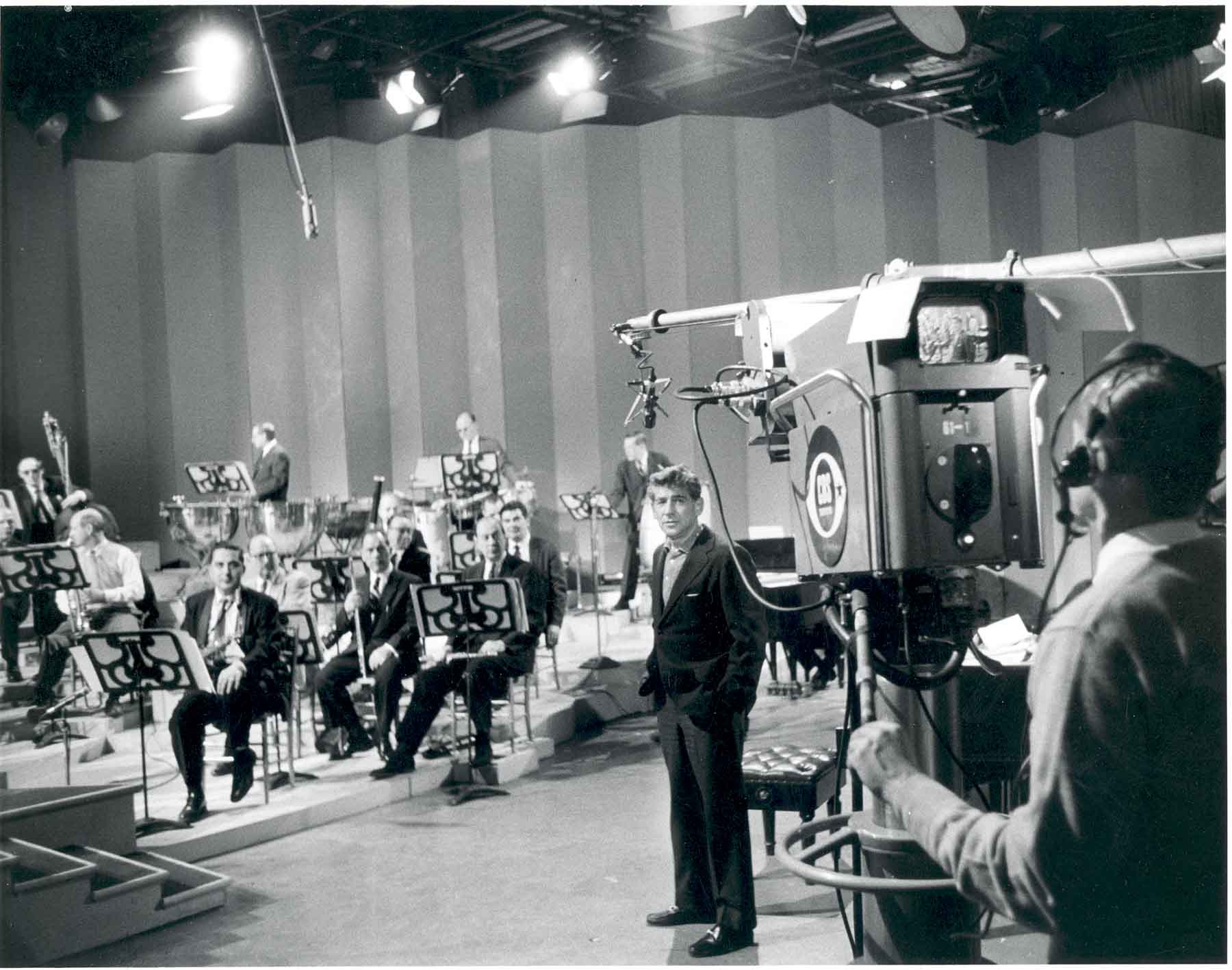
Bernstein with members of the New York Philharmonic rehearsing for a television broadcast, c. 1958

In 1958, Bernstein and Mitropoulos led the New York Philharmonic on its first tour south of the border, through 12 countries in Central and South America. The United States Department of State sponsored the tour to improve the nation's relations with its southern neighbors. In 1959, the Department of State also sponsored Bernstein and the philharmonic on a 50-concert tour through Europe and the Soviet Union, portions of which were filmed by the CBS Television Network. A highlight of the tour was Bernstein's performance of Shostakovich's Fifth Symphony, in the presence of the composer, who came on stage at the end to congratulate Bernstein and the musicians.

=== 1960s: Innovations and Lincoln Center ===
New York Philharmonic Innovations

Bernstein's innovative approach to themed programming included introducing audiences to composers less-performed at the time such as Gustav Mahler, Carl Nielsen, Jean Sibelius, and Charles Ives (including the world premiere of his Symphony No. 2). Bernstein actively advocated for the commission and performance of works by contemporary composers, conducting over 40 world premieres by a diverse roster of composers ranging from John Cage to Alberto Ginastera to Luciano Berio. He also conducted US premieres of 19 major works from around the globe, including works by Dmitri Shostakovich, Pierre Boulez, and György Ligeti.

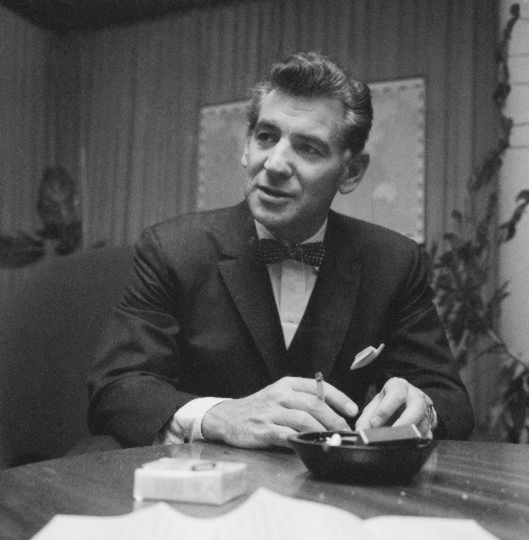
Bernstein during a visit to Finland, 1959

Bernstein championed American composers, especially those with whom he had a close friendship, such as Aaron Copland, William Schuman, and David Diamond. This decade saw a significant expansion of Bernstein and the philharmonic's collaboration with Columbia Records, together they released over 400 compositions, covering a broad swath of the classical music canon. Bernstein welcomed the philharmonic's additions of its first Black musician, Sanford Allen, and its second woman musician, Orin O'Brien. Bernstein also shared the philharmonic's commitment to connecting with as many New Yorkers as possible. That vision became a reality with the launch of the Concerts in the Parks in 1965, which Bernstein conducted often. Another milestone was the philharmonic's first visit to Japan in 1961, when Bernstein led acclaimed philharmonic concerts and engaged in cultural exchange. Over the years, he led the orchestra on tours to 144 cities in 38 countries.

Bernstein initiated the philharmonic's informal Thursday Evening Preview Concerts, which included Bernstein's talks from the stage, a practice that was unheard of at the time. In one oft-reported incident, on April 6, 1962, Bernstein appeared on stage before a performance of the Brahms Piano Concerto No. 1 in D minor to explain that the soloist, Glenn Gould, had chosen an idiosyncratic approach to the work. Bernstein explained that while he did not totally agree with it, he thought Gould's interpretation was an artistically worthy exploration. Bernstein questioned: "In a concerto, who is the boss: the soloist or the conductor?" The incident created a stir that reverberated in the press for decades; see New York Philharmonic concert of April 6, 1962 § Legacy.

In 1960, Bernstein and the New York Philharmonic marked the centennial of Gustav Mahler's birth with a series of performances. The composer's widow, Alma, attended some of Bernstein's rehearsals. That same year, Bernstein made his first commercial recording of a Mahler symphony (the Fourth). Over the next seven years, he recorded the entire Mahler symphony cycle with the New York Philharmonic (except for the 8th Symphony, which was recorded with the London Symphony Orchestra). The combination of concert performances, television talks, and recordings led to a renewed interest in Mahler, especially in the United States. Bernstein claimed that he identified with the works on a personal level, and once wrote of the composer: "I'm so sympathetic to Mahler: I understand his problem. It's like being two different men locked up in the same body; one man is a conductor and the other a composer ... It's like being a double man."

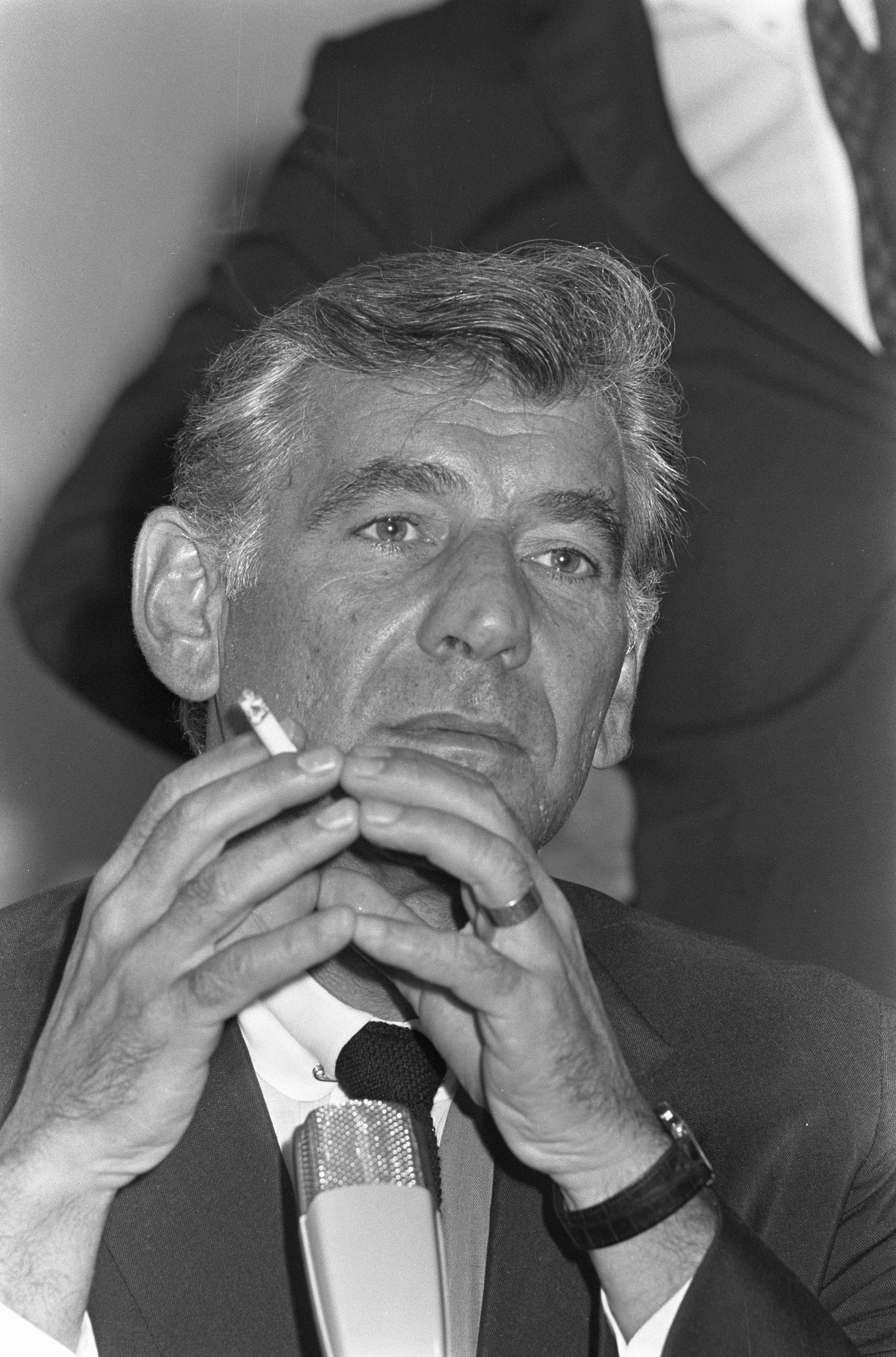
Bernstein in Amsterdam, 1968

Opening Lincoln Center

On May 14, 1959, President Dwight D. Eisenhower broke ground for Lincoln Center for the Performing Arts. On September 23, 1962, the New York Philharmonic moved from Carnegie Hall to its new home, Philharmonic Hall (now David Geffen Hall). Bernstein conducted the gala opening concert featuring works by Mahler, Beethoven, and Vaughan Williams, as well as the premiere of Aaron Copland's Connotations. In 1964, Bernstein conducted at the Metropolitan Opera for the first time in Franco Zeffirelli's production of Verdi's Falstaff. In subsequent years, Bernstein returned to The Met to conduct Cavalleria rusticana (1970) and Carmen (1972), as well as at the Centennial Gala in 1983.

An Artist's Response to Violence

In 1961, Bernstein composed and conducted a fanfare for President John F. Kennedy's pre-inaugural gala.

On November 23, 1963, the day after the assassination of President John F. Kennedy, Bernstein conducted the New York Philharmonic and the Schola Cantorum of New York in a nationally televised memorial featuring the Mahler's Symphony No. 2: "Resurrection". Later that week, in a speech to the United Jewish Appeal, Bernstein said: "This will be our reply to violence: to make music more intensely, more beautifully, more devotedly than ever before." After Senator Robert F. Kennedy was assassinated in 1968, Bernstein conducted the "Adagietto" movement from Mahler's Symphony No. 5 at the funeral mass.

Kaddish and Chichester Psalms

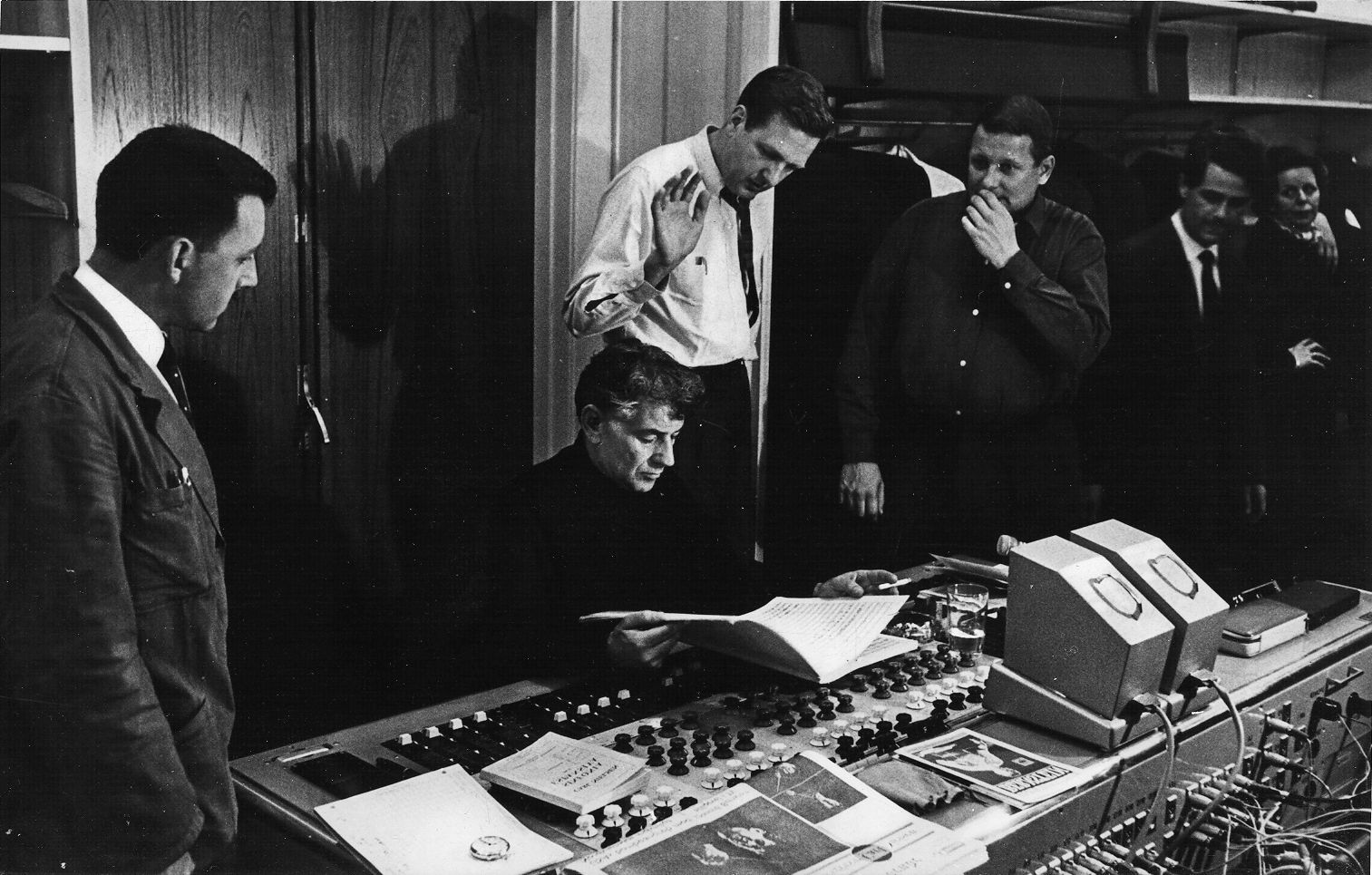
Audio recording for CBS of Symphony No. 3 by Danish composer Carl Nielsen in Copenhagen, 1965

Due to his commitment to the New York Philharmonic and his many other activities, Bernstein had little time for composition during the 1960s, composing just two major works. His Symphony No. 3: Kaddish was written in 1963; Bernstein dedicated the work: "To the Beloved Memory of John F. Kennedy." The work features a large orchestra, a full choir, a boys' choir, a soprano soloist, and a narrator. "Kaddish" refers to the Jewish prayer recited for the dead. Bernstein wrote the text of the narration himself; his wife, Felicia Montealegre-Cohn, narrated the US premiere of the work.

In 1965, Bernstein took a sabbatical year from the New York Philharmonic to concentrate on composition, during which he composed Chichester Psalms. Commissioned by the Dean of Chichester Cathedral, Walter Hussey, the work premiered at Philharmonic Hall in New York City on July 15, 1965, conducted by Bernstein himself, and subsequently at Chichester Cathedral, conducted by the cathedral's Organist and Master of the Choristers, John Birch. For his text, Bernstein chose excerpts from the Book of Psalms in the original Hebrew. In 2018, Bernstein's Centennial year, Chichester Psalms was cited as the 5th-most performed concert work worldwide.

Vienna Philharmonic debut

In 1966, Bernstein began a lifelong rich relationship with the Vienna Philharmonic, conducting concerts as well as making his debut at the Vienna State Opera in Luchino Visconti's production of Falstaff with Dietrich Fischer-Dieskau in the title role. Bernstein was largely responsible for restoring the works of Mahler to the Vienna Philharmonic's core repertoire. Bernstein recorded Mahler's Symphonies numerous times with the orchestra. Bernstein returned to the State Opera in 1968 for a production of Der Rosenkavalier and in 1970 for Otto Schenk's production of Beethoven's Fidelio.

=== 1970s: Mass, Dybbuk and international acclaim ===
During the 1970s, Bernstein's company, Amberson, in partnership with Unitel, produced and coordinated filmed recordings of his symphonic concerts around the world. For the rest of his life, Bernstein preferred to derive his audio recordings from live performances. Nearly 80% of Bernstein's recordings with his new recording partner, Deutsche Grammophon, were recorded live.

Bernstein's major compositions during the 1970s were his Mass: A Theatre Piece for Singers, Players, and Dancers 1971), his score for the ballet Dybbuk (1974); his orchestral vocal work Songfest (1977); and his U.S. bicentennial musical 1600 Pennsylvania Avenue (1976), with lyrics by Alan Jay Lerner, which was his last Broadway show and only theatrical flop.

Mass: A Theatre Piece for Singers, Players, and Dancers (1971)

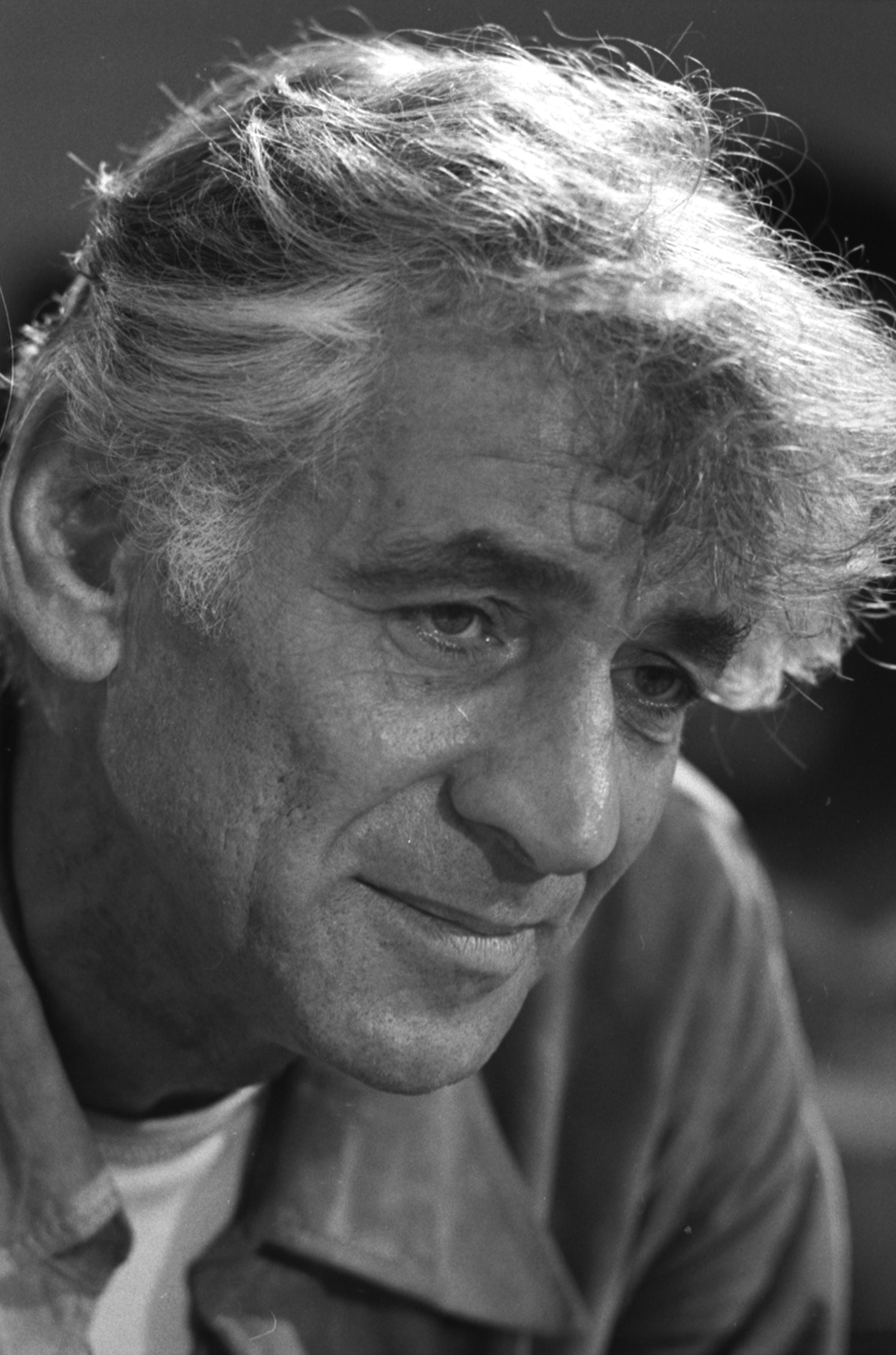
Bernstein in rehearsal of his Mass, 1971

In 1966, Jacqueline Kennedy Onassis commissioned Bernstein to compose a work for the inauguration of the John F. Kennedy Center for the Performing Arts in Washington, D.C., Bernstein began writing Mass in 1969 as a large-scale theatrical work based on the Tridentine Mass of the Catholic Church, and in 1971, Bernstein invited the young composer and lyricist Stephen Schwartz, who had recently opened the musical Godspell off-Broadway, to collaborate as co-lyricist. The world premiere took place on September 8, 1971, conducted by Maurice Peress, directed by Gordon Davidson, and choreographed by Alvin Ailey.

Bernstein's score combines elements of musical theater, jazz, gospel, blues, folk, rock, and symphonic music, and the libretto combines Latin and English liturgy, Hebrew prayer, and additional lyrics written by Bernstein and Schwartz.

Mass received both rapturous and critical reactions, from audiences and music critics alike. While some members of the Catholic Church praised the piece's expression of contemporary crises of faith, others considered it blasphemous. (In 2000, Pope John Paul II requested a performance of Mass at the Vatican itself.) President Richard Nixon declined to attend the premiere due to its anti-Vietnam War message. Viewpoints on Mass continue to evolve over time, and Edward Seckerson wrote in 2021, 50 years after its premiere: "Put simply, no other work of Bernstein's encapsulates exactly who he was as a man or as a musician; no other work displays his genius, his intellect, his musical virtuosity and innate theatricality quite like Mass."

The album Mass peaked at No. 53 on the Billboard Top LPs, during a twenty-week run on the chart.

The Unanswered Question: Six Talks at Harvard

In the 1972–73 academic year, Bernstein was appointed to the Charles Eliot Norton Chair as Professor of Poetry at Harvard, where he delivered six lectures, The Unanswered Question, which explored such elements as tonality, harmony, and form through the lens of Noam Chomsky's linguistic theories. Bernstein provided musical examples from the piano, and pre-recorded musical works with the Boston Symphony Orchestra. Amberson arranged for the lectures to be videotaped at the WGBH studios in Boston. The six lectures were broadcast on PBS in 1976, and subsequently released on home video and published as a book.

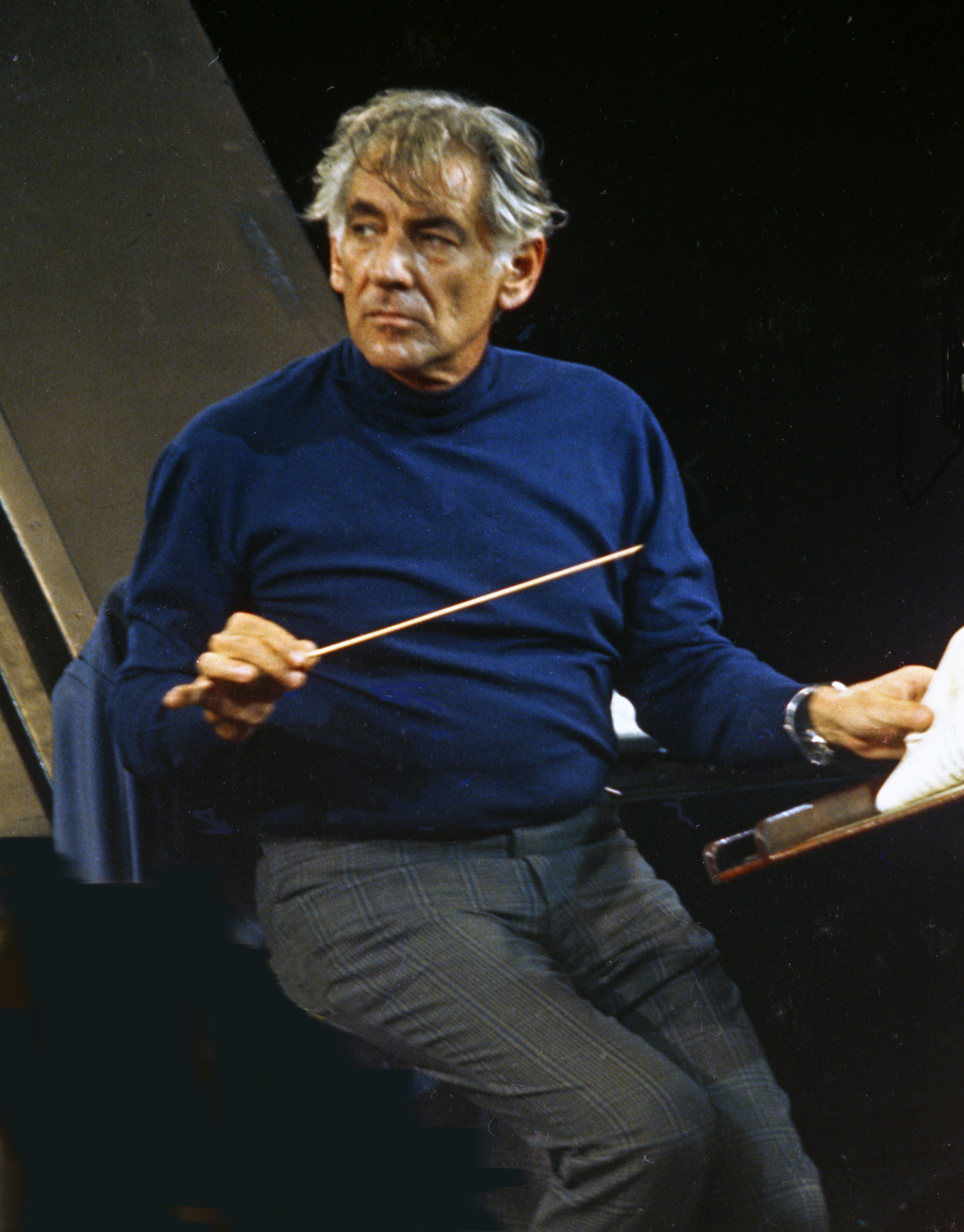
Leonard Bernstein by Allan Warren, 1973

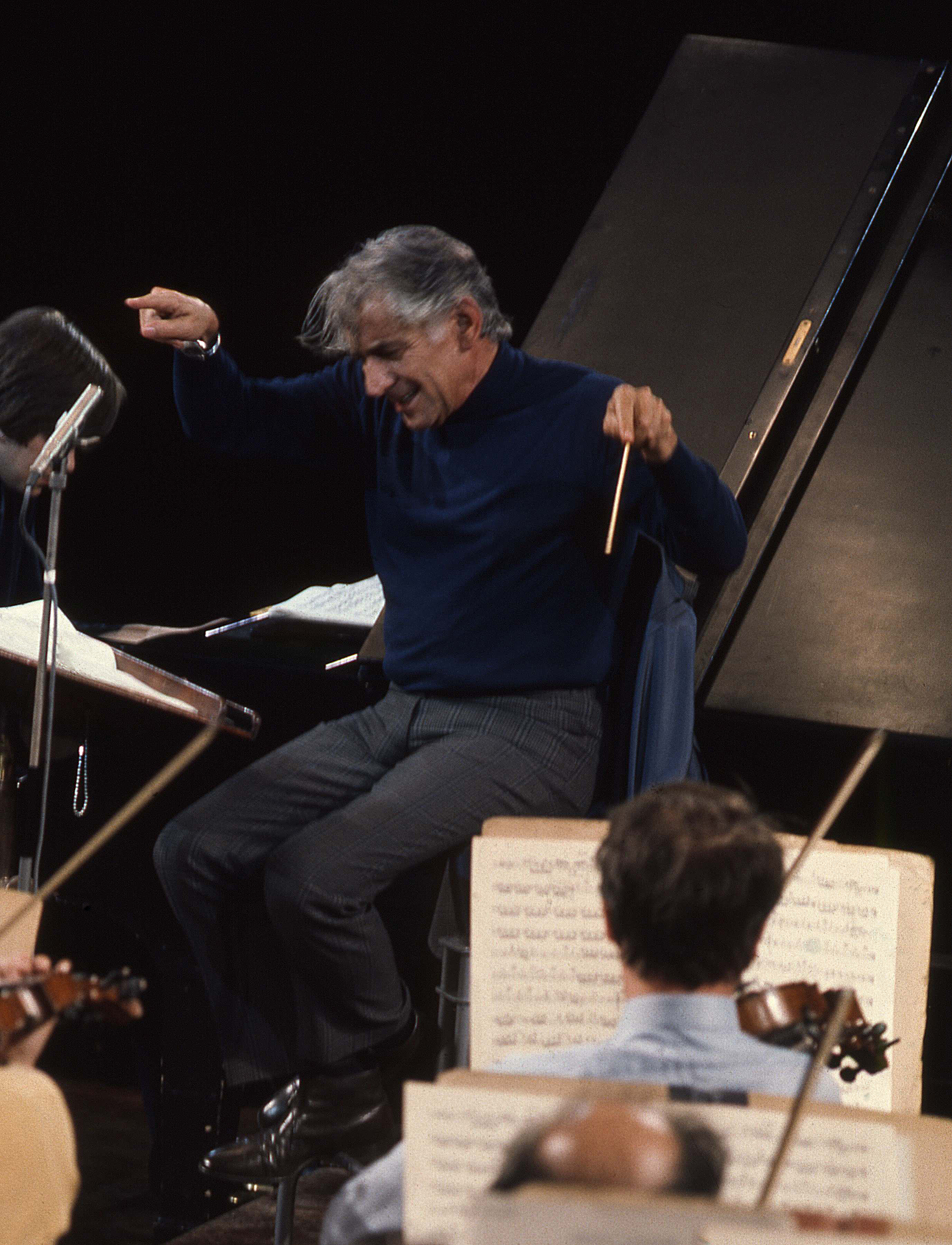
Leonard Bernstein by Allan Warren, 1973

Dybbuk (1974)

Bernstein collaborated with Jerome Robbins to create Dybbuk, a ballet based on S. Ansky's play of the same name. The ballet depicts Ansky's tale of a young woman possessed by a malicious spirit, known in Jewish folklore as a "dybbuk". Dybbuk was premiered by the New York City Ballet at the New York State Theater on May 16, 1974, with Bernstein conducting. A revision of the choreography and the score was made later the same year, titled Dybbuk Variations. It received its premiere in November 1974.

Songfest: A Cycle of American Poems for Six Singers and Orchestra

Bernstein's Songfest: A Cycle of American Poems for Six Singers and Orchestra premiered on October 11, 1977, the Kennedy Center in Washington, D.C., with the composer conducting the National Symphony Orchestra. The work was intended as a tribute to the 1976 American Bicentennial, but was not finished in time. The work sets an array of texts by 13 American poets spanning three centuries. Bernstein deliberately selected the widest possible array of literary voices to express the nation's essential diversity; the poets include June Jordan, Julia de Burgos, Walt Whitman, and Langston Hughes. On July 4, 1985, Bernstein conducted a nationally televised performance of Songfest as part of the National Symphony's annual A Capitol Fourth concert.

International conducting and recordings

After becoming conductor laureate of the New York Philharmonic in 1969, Bernstein took advantage of his freed-up schedule to increase the pace of his world travel, conducting twenty-nine orchestras throughout Europe, Asia, and the Americas, and making live recordings with them for both Unitel and Deutsche Grammophon. Bernstein founded Amberson Productions in 1969. In partnership with Unitel, Amberson created many video productions of concert performances, starting with Verdi's Requiem Mass in St. Paul's Cathedral with the London Symphony Orchestra in 1970, produced and directed by Humphrey Burton. Burton would go on to collaborate with Bernstein on his music video projects for the rest of Bernstein's life.

In 1972, Bernstein recorded Bizet's Carmen, with Marilyn Horne in the title role and James McCracken as Don Jose, after leading several stage performances of the opera at the Metropolitan Opera. The recording was one of the first in stereo to use the original spoken dialogue between the sung portions of the opera. The recording was Bernstein's first for Deutsche Grammophon and won a Grammy. In working with Unitel and Deutsche Grammophon, Bernstein made a host of video and audio recordings with such orchestras as Royal Concertgebouw Orchestra, Orchestre de Paris, Boston Symphony Orchestra, Orchestra Sinfonica di Roma della Rai, Israel Philharmonic Orchestra, and Orchestre National de France. In the late 1970s, Bernstein conducted a complete Beethoven symphony cycle with the Vienna Philharmonic, and cycles of Brahms and Schumann were to follow in the 1980s.

Among the many noteworthy Amberson productions with Unitel were Bernstein conducting Mahler's Symphony No. 2 "Resurrection" with the London Symphony Orchestra at Ely Cathedral in 1973 and Fidelio at the Vienna State Opera in 1978. In 1970, Bernstein wrote and narrated "Bernstein on Beethoven: A Celebration in Vienna," an in-depth exploration of Beethoven on the composer's 200th birthday, filmed on location in and around Vienna. It features excerpts of Bernstein's rehearsals and performance of Fidelio at the Vienna State Opera, directed by Otto Schenk (which was later revived and filmed in 1978); Bernstein playing the Piano Concerto No. 1 and conducting from the piano; and a performance of Symphony No. 9 with the Vienna Philharmonic, featuring the young Plácido Domingo among the soloists. The show, produced and directed by Humphrey Burton, was broadcast around the world and won an Emmy Award.

Also recorded by Unitel, in October 1976, was Bernstein's concert in Munich with the Bavarian Radio Symphony Orchestra and pianist Claudio Arrau to benefit Amnesty International. To honor his late wife and to continue their joint support for human rights, Bernstein subsequently established the Felicia Montealegre Bernstein Fund of Amnesty International USA to provide aid for human rights activists.

In 1979, Bernstein conducted the Berlin Philharmonic for the first and only time, in two charity concerts for Amnesty International featuring performances of Mahler's Ninth Symphony, recorded live on Deutsche Grammophon. The invitation for the concerts had come from the orchestra and not from its principal conductor Herbert von Karajan. There has been speculation about why Karajan never invited Bernstein to conduct his orchestra. The full reasons will probably never be known—they were on friendly terms and respected each other, but sometimes practiced a little mutual one-upmanship such that they were described as fierce rivals. It was often suggested that Bernstein could not conduct in Berlin while Karajan was alive (the Berlin Philharmonic was regarded as Karajan's own), the truth was that Berlin Philharmonic's managing director Wolfgang Stresemann actually invited Bernstein but as part of a subscription concert series, which Bernstein disliked.

One major project failed. After Rudolf Bing's departure from the Met, Bernstein worked intensively with general manager Schuyler Chapin to stage Porgy and Bess at the Met, to be conducted by himself. Reservations prevailed, Chapin stepped down. The opera finally premiered at the Met in 1985, with James Levine conducting.

=== 1980s: A Quiet Place, and Tanglewood ===
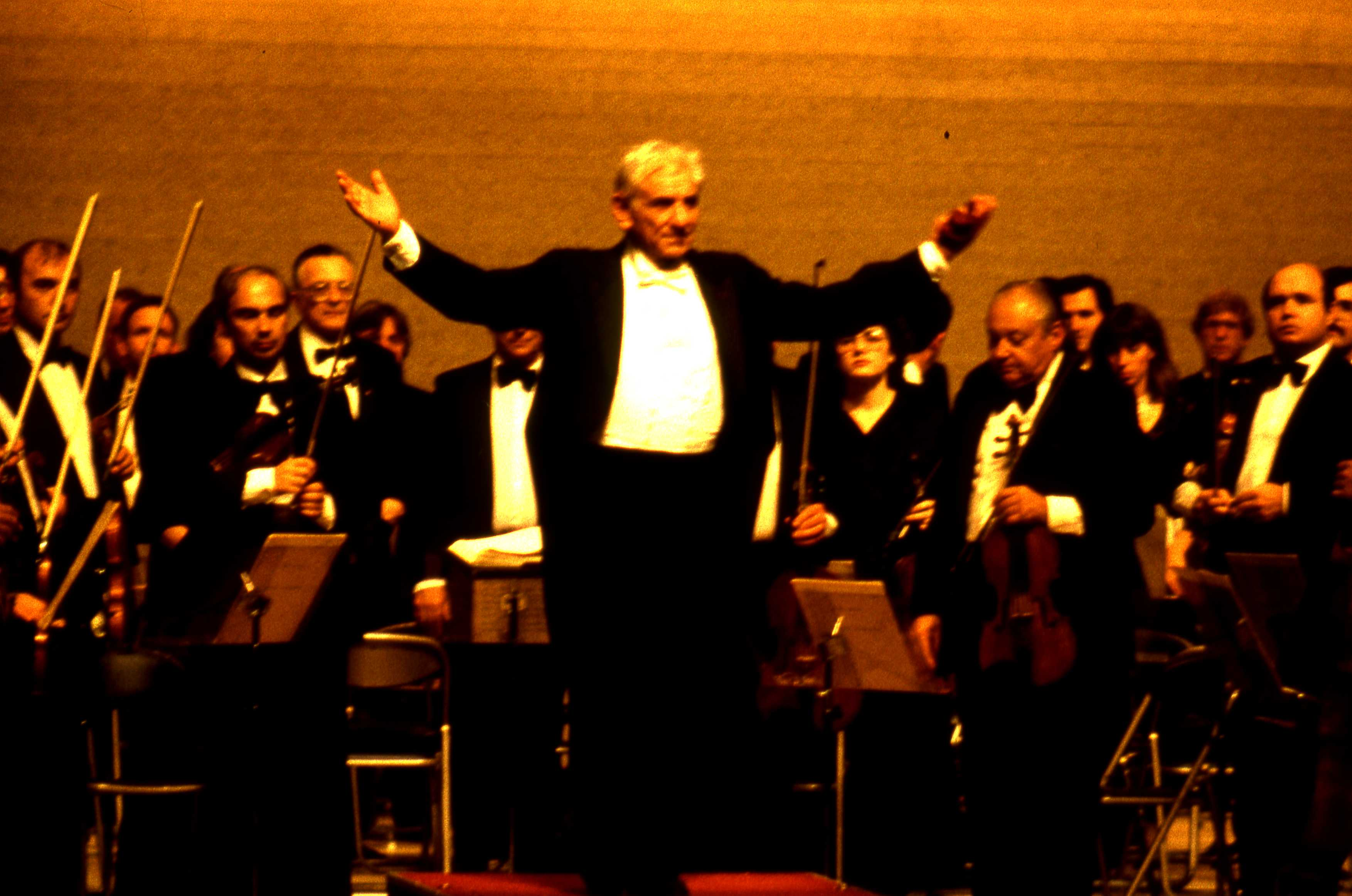
Bernstein visited Japan with the Israel Philharmonic Orchestra in 1985 and conducted Mahler's Symphony No. 9

During the 1980s, Bernstein pursued a packed schedule, continuing to conduct, teach, compose, and produce several television documentaries. Bernstein's most significant compositions of the decade were his opera A Quiet Place; Divertimento for Orchestra; Ḥalil for flute and orchestra; Concerto for Orchestra "Jubilee Games"; and the song cycle Arias and Barcarolles. Bernstein received the Kennedy Center Honors award in 1980, a Grammy Lifetime Achievement Award in 1985, France's Legion of Honour (Commander) in 1985, and Japan's Praemium Imperiale in 1990, among others.

In the 1980s, Bernstein cemented his educational legacy by co-founding three music academies: Los Angeles Philharmonic Institute, Schleswig-Holstein Musik Festival Orchestral Academy, and the Pacific Music Festival. Bernstein continued his longtime relationship with Tanglewood to the end of his life, including a lavish televised gala in 1988 to celebrate his 70th birthday, as well as his final concert performance in August 1990.

A Quiet Place (1983)

In 1983, Bernstein wrote a new opera, A Quiet Place, with a libretto by Stephen Wadsworth. The opera premiered at the Houston Grand Opera on June 17, 1983, conducted by John DeMain. The opera was a sequel to Bernstein's 1951 opera Trouble in Tahiti, which preceded the new opera at the premiere. In 1984, Bernstein and Wadsworth reconfigured A Quiet Place to include Trouble in Tahiti in its middle. This version was performed at La Scala and the Kennedy Center, with John Mauceri conducting. In 1986, after a third revision, Bernstein himself conducted and recorded the work at the Vienna State Opera.

Conducting activities

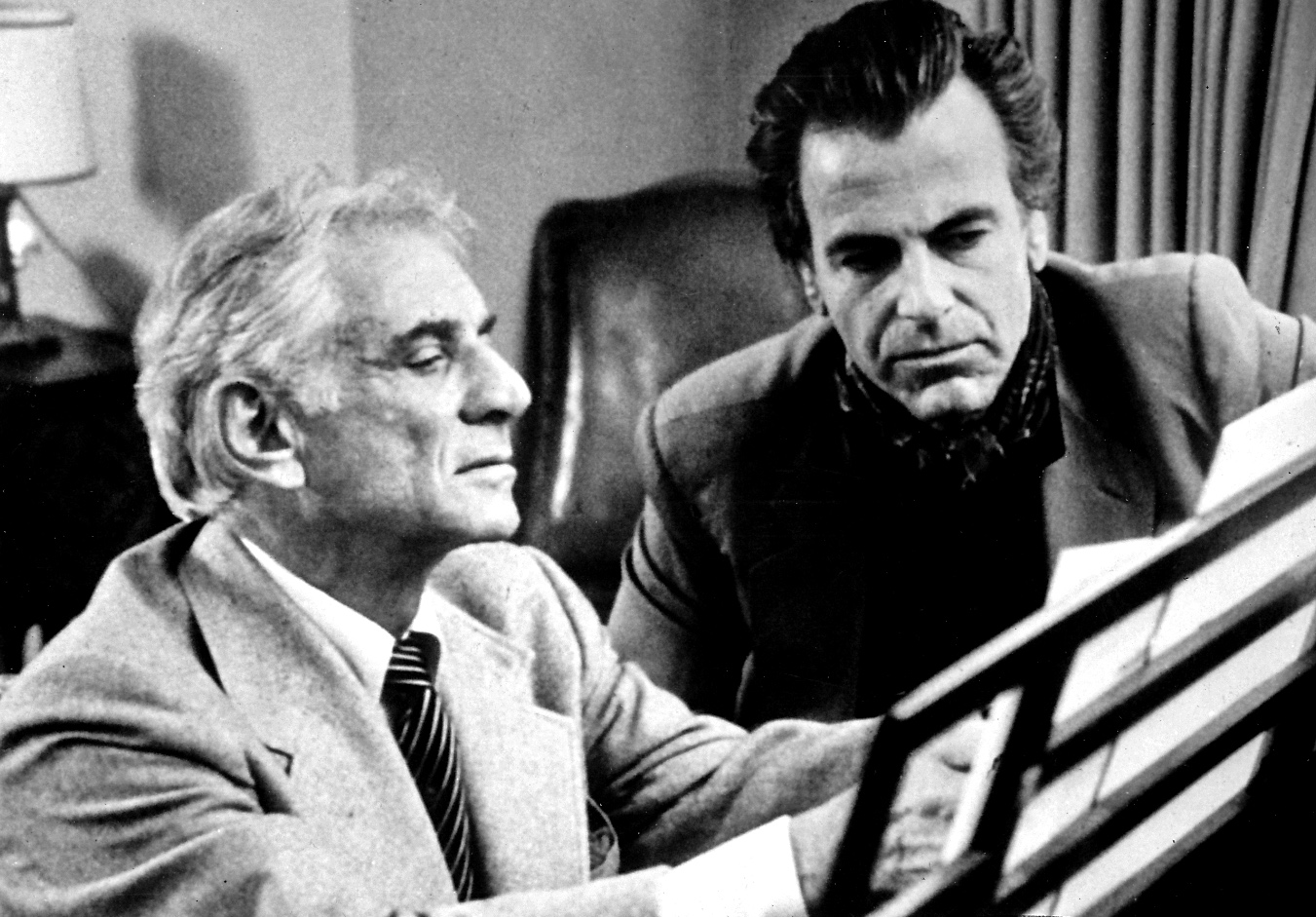
Bernstein with Maximilian Schell on PBS Beethoven TV series, 1983

During the 1980s, in addition to continuing his productive relationship with the New York, Israel, and Vienna Philharmonics, Bernstein was also a regular guest conductor with several other major orchestras around the world. In Munich with the Bavarian Radio Symphony Orchestra, Bernstein recorded works including Wagner's Tristan und Isolde; Haydn's Creation; and Mozart's Requiem and Great Mass in C minor. In Rome with the Accademia Nazionale di Santa Cecilia, Bernstein recorded works by Debussy, as well as Puccini's La bohème, featuring an all-American cast. In Amsterdam with Royal Concertgebouw Orchestra, Bernstein recorded Mahler's Symphonies No. 1, 4, and 9, among other works.

In May 1986, the London Symphony Orchestra mounted a Bernstein Festival at the Barbican Centre, featuring a concert in which Bernstein conducted his own works. Queen Elizabeth II attended the performance. In December 1989, Bernstein conducted the London Symphony Orchestra in his operetta Candide and subsequently recorded the work at Abbey Road Studios. The recording starred Jerry Hadley, June Anderson, Christa Ludwig, and Adolph Green in the leading roles. The live concert from the Barbican Centre in London was captured on video.

Ode to "Freedom" (1989)

On December 25, 1989, Bernstein conducted Beethoven's Symphony No. 9 in East Berlin's Konzerthaus as part of a celebration of the fall of the Berlin Wall. He had conducted the same work in West Berlin the previous day. The orchestra consisted of members representing the two German States and the four occupying powers of post-war Berlin. The Christmas Day concert was broadcast live to an estimated audience of 100 million people in more than twenty countries. For the occasion, Bernstein reworded Friedrich Schiller's text of the Ode to Joy, replacing the word Freude (joy) with the word Freiheit (freedom). Bernstein added, "I'm sure that Beethoven would have given us his blessing."

Final concert at Tanglewood

Bernstein conducted his last concert on August 19, 1990, with the Boston Symphony Orchestra at Tanglewood. He led Benjamin Britten's Four Sea Interludes from Peter Grimes and Beethoven's Symphony No. 7. The program also included Bernstein's own Arias and Barcarolles in a new orchestration by Bright Sheng. However, poor health prevented Bernstein from preparing it, and Tanglewood Conducting Fellow Carl St. Clair was engaged to conduct the work in his stead.

Bernstein suffered a coughing fit during the third movement of the Beethoven, but continued to conduct the piece to its conclusion, leaving the stage during the ovation, appearing exhausted and in pain. The concert was later issued on CD as Leonard Bernstein – The Final Concert by Deutsche Grammophon.

Amberson Productions

Bernstein's Amberson Productions continued its collaborations with Unitel throughout the 1980s. In 1982, PBS aired an Emmy-nominated series Bernstein/Beethoven featuring all nine Beethoven symphonies and other works using films that Unitel had recorded of Bernstein conducting the Vienna Philharmonic in the late 1970s. The series includes conversations between Bernstein and actor Maximilian Schell, who also read from Beethoven's letters.

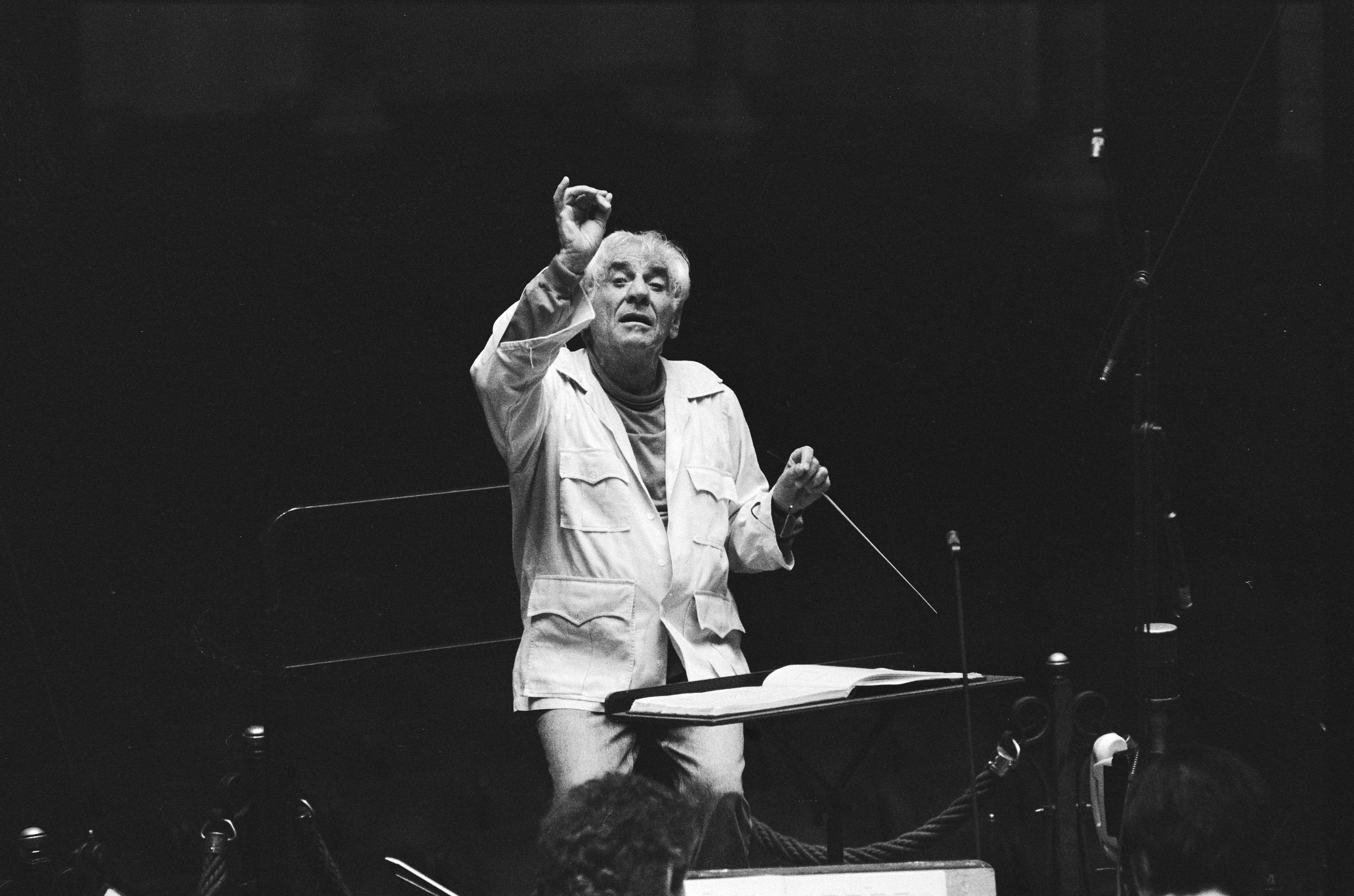
Bernstein conducting the Concertgebouw Orchestra, 1985

In 1984, Bernstein conducted a Deutsche Grammophon recording of West Side Story, his only recording of the entire work. The album, featuring opera singers Kiri Te Kanawa, José Carreras, Marilyn Horne, and Tatiana Troyanos, was an international bestseller. An Emmy-nominated film The Making of West Side Story documented the recording process.

Other documentaries that Bernstein made during the 1980s include The Little Drummer Boy, which delved into the music of Gustav Mahler, and The Love of Three Orchestras, exploring his work with the New York, Vienna, and Israel Philharmonics.

Educational activities

Bernstein's nurturing experience at the Tanglewood Music Festival inspired him to use his international influence to recreate that environment for young musicians in the final years of his life. During summer 1987, Bernstein celebrated the 100th anniversary of Nadia Boulanger at the American Conservatory in Fontainebleau. Bernstein gave a master class inside the castle of Fontainebleau.

Los Angeles Philharmonic Institute

In 1982, Bernstein, with Los Angeles Philharmonic general manager Ernest Fleischmann and University of Southern California professor Daniel Lewis, co-founded the Los Angeles Philharmonic Institute, a summer training academy inspired by Tanglewood. Bernstein served as artistic co-director and taught conducting classes for two summers. During that time, he performed and recorded American works, including some of his own, with the Los Angeles Philharmonic for Deutsche Grammophon.

Orchestra Academy of the Schleswig-Holstein Music Festival

In May 1986, Bernstein conducted the Bavarian Radio Symphony Orchestra and Chorus for the inaugural concert of the Schleswig-Holstein Musik Festival, in a performance of Haydn's Die Schöpfung (The Creation). He returned the following year when he founded the festival's Orchestra Academy, once again recreating the nurturing atmosphere of Bernstein's Tanglewood experience. Over three summers, Bernstein took the students on international tours to Germany, Italy, and the Soviet Union.

To commemorate Bernstein's legacy as an educator and founder of the Orchestra Academy, the festival created the Leonard Bernstein Award in 2002, which has honored young musicians including Lang Lang, Jonathan Biss, and Alisa Weilerstein, among many others.

Founding of the Pacific Music Festival

In 1990, Bernstein's final summer, he founded the Pacific Music Festival in Sapporo, Japan with Michael Tilson Thomas and the London Symphony Orchestra. The festival's goal was to emphasize musical training for young students in the Pacific region.

In his opening address, Bernstein said: "And my decision has been, without too much thought, to spend most of the remaining energy and time the Lord grants me in education and sharing, as much as possible, with younger people." As artistic director, Bernstein worked with the students in that first summer, but had to cut his time short due to ill health.

Bernstein Education Through the Arts (BETA) Fund

In 1990, Bernstein received the Praemium Imperiale, an international prize awarded by the Japan Arts Association for lifetime achievement in the arts. Bernstein used the $100,000 prize to establish The Bernstein Education Through the Arts (BETA) Fund. He provided this grant to develop an arts-based education program. The Leonard Bernstein Center was posthumously established in April 1992, and initiated extensive school-based research, ultimately leading to the current Leonard Bernstein Artful Learning Program.

Vienna New Year's Concert

In the same year, the Vienna Philharmonic invited Leonard Bernstein to conduct their 1992 New Year's Concert with waltzes and polkas of the Strauss dynasty. He died fifteen months prior to the event. Carlos Kleiber was asked to step in.

== Personal life ==
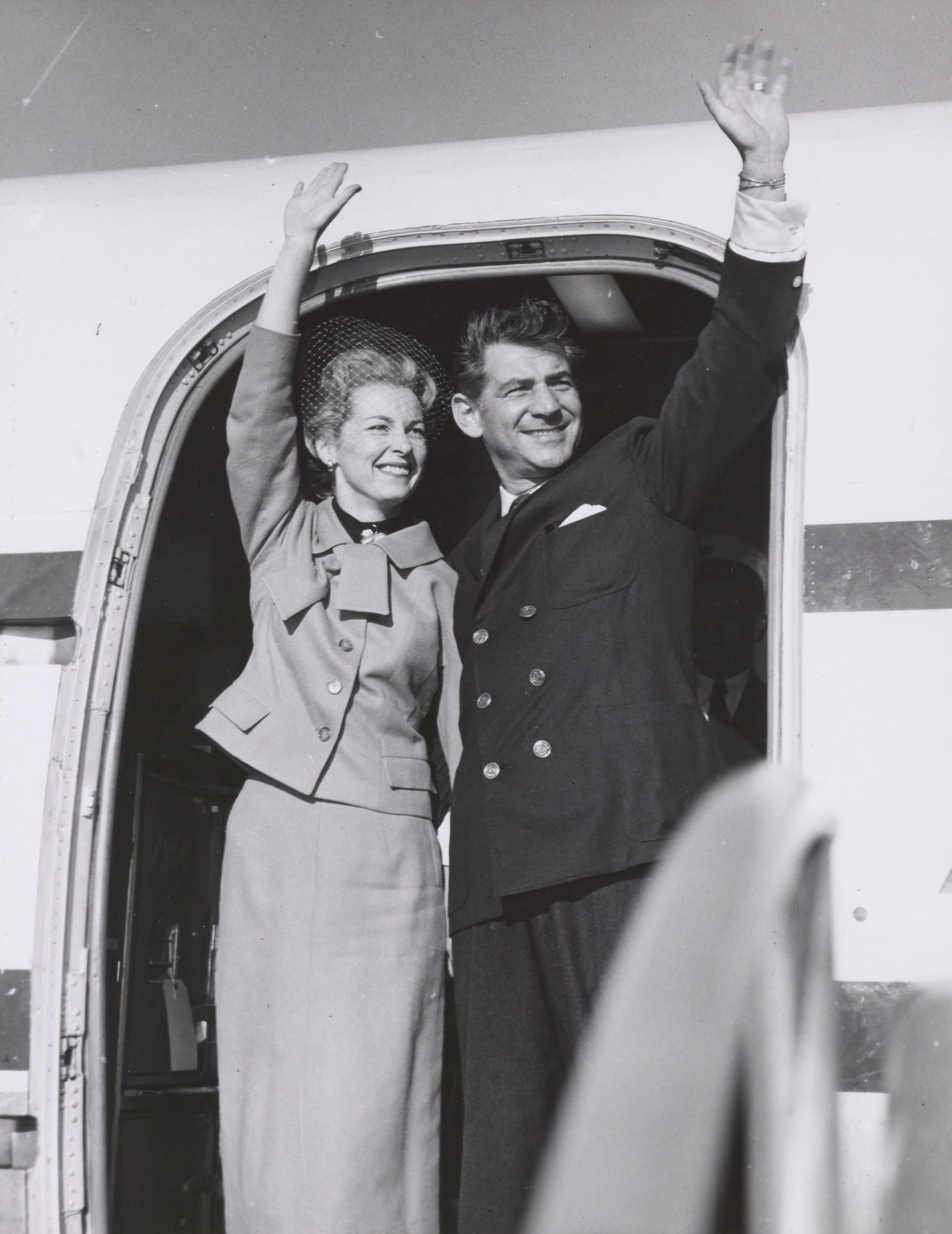
Leonard and Felicia Bernstein leaving for Israel, 1957

Bernstein had two younger siblings, Shirley and Burton. The three children lived with their parents, Samuel and Jennie, in the suburbs of Boston, Massachusetts, in a community of mostly Eastern European Jewish immigrants.

Bernstein had asthma which kept him from serving in the military during World War II. He was classified 4-F for this condition and felt conflicted about his inability to serve.

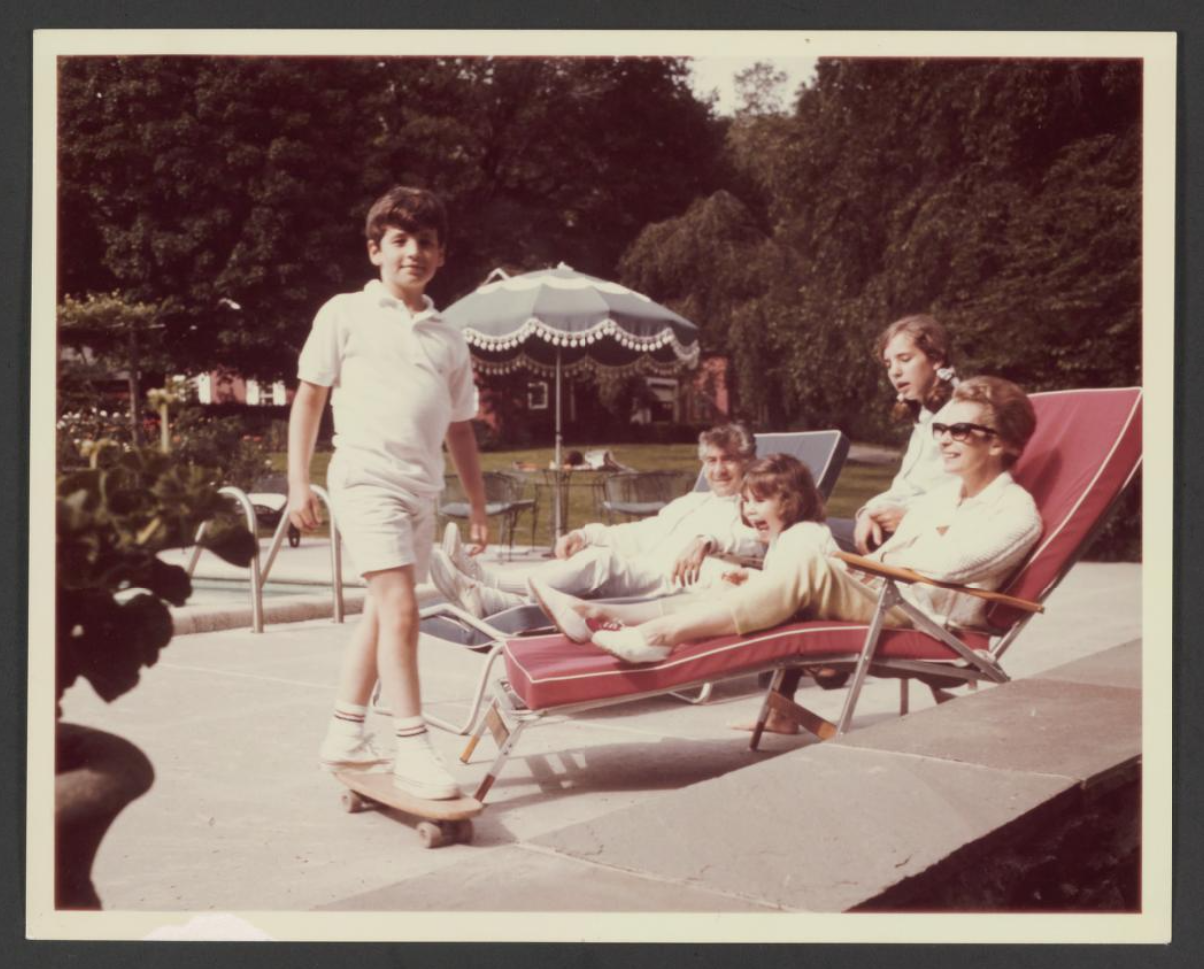
Bernstein with his wife (Felicia) and three children at their Fairfield, Connecticut home, 1966

Bernstein married actress Felicia Montealegre-Cohn on September 9, 1951. They had three children: Jamie, Alexander, and Nina. The Bernstein family lived in New York City and Fairfield, Connecticut, and maintained a close-knit atmosphere surrounded by extended family and friends. The family owned a house in Redding, Connecticut, which they sold in 1964. Bernstein had a studio with a piano in each of his dwellings. The contents of his former studio at Fairfield, Connecticut are housed at the Indiana University Jacobs School of Music.

Throughout his life, Bernstein had affairs with both men and women. In April 1943, he sought advice from Aaron Copland about living as a gay man in the public eye, a notion he brought up again in a letter to David Oppenheim in July of that year. In a private letter written after their marriage, Felicia acknowledged her husband's sexual orientation. She wrote to him: "You are a homosexual and may never change – you don't admit to the possibility of a double life, but if your peace of mind, your health, your whole nervous system depend on a certain sexual pattern what can you do?"

In 1976, Bernstein left Felicia for a period to live in Northern California with Tom Cothran, a music scholar who had assisted him on research for the Charles Eliot Norton Lectures that Bernstein delivered at Harvard. The following year, Felicia was diagnosed with lung cancer. Bernstein moved back in with her and cared for her until her death on June 16, 1978.

Bernstein continued to have relationships with men until his death on October 14, 1990.

When he was not composing and conducting, Bernstein enjoyed skiing, playing tennis, and engaging in all manner of word games, especially anagrams.

== Death and legacy ==
Bernstein announced his retirement from conducting on October 9, 1990. He died five days later at the age of 72, in his New York apartment at the Dakota, of a heart attack brought on by pleural tumor. A longtime heavy smoker, Bernstein had emphysema from his mid-50s. On the day of his funeral procession through the streets of Manhattan, construction workers removed their hats and waved, calling out "Goodbye, Lenny". Bernstein is buried near the summit of Battle Hill at Green-Wood Cemetery in Brooklyn, New York, next to his wife and with a copy of the score of Mahler's Fifth Symphony lying across his heart.

On August 25, 2018 (the 100th anniversary of his birth), Bernstein was honored with a Google Doodle. The Skirball Cultural Center in Los Angeles created an exhibition titled Leonard Bernstein at 100 for his centennial.

Bradley Cooper's drama film Maestro (2023) chronicles the relationship between Bernstein (played by Cooper) and his wife, Felicia Montealegre (played by Carey Mulligan). Produced by Steven Spielberg and Martin Scorsese, the film premiered at the Venice International Film Festival. As the Spotlight Gala feature of the 61st New York Film Festival, it was the first film presentation at the recently renovated David Geffen Hall in Lincoln Center, which was also where Bernstein had conducted as music director of the New York Philharmonic from its opening as Philharmonic Hall in 1962 until 1969.

Bernstein sought to make music both intelligible and enjoyable to all. Through his educational efforts, including several books and the creation of two major international music festivals, Bernstein influenced several generations of young musicians.

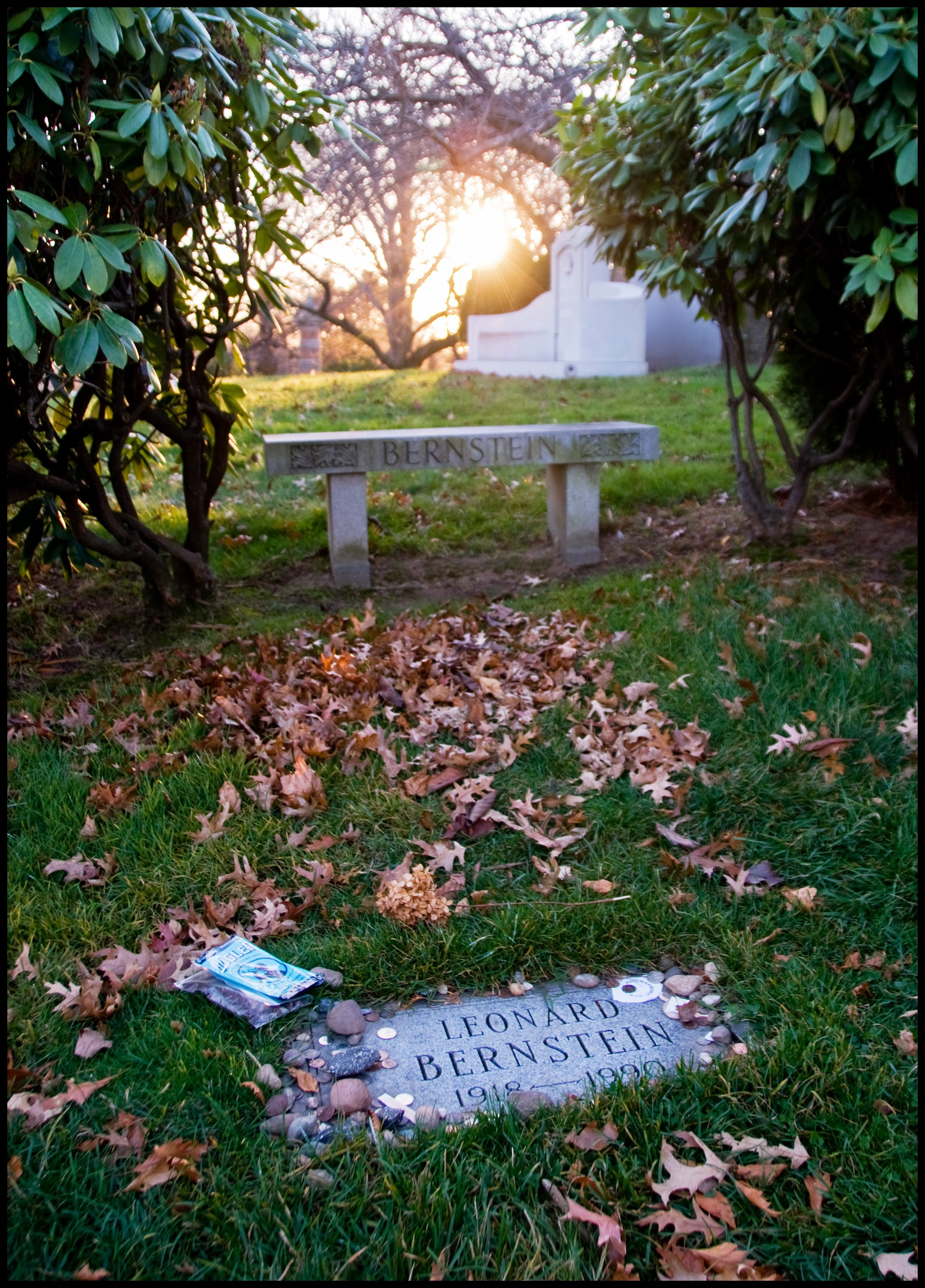
Bernstein's grave in Green-Wood Cemetery

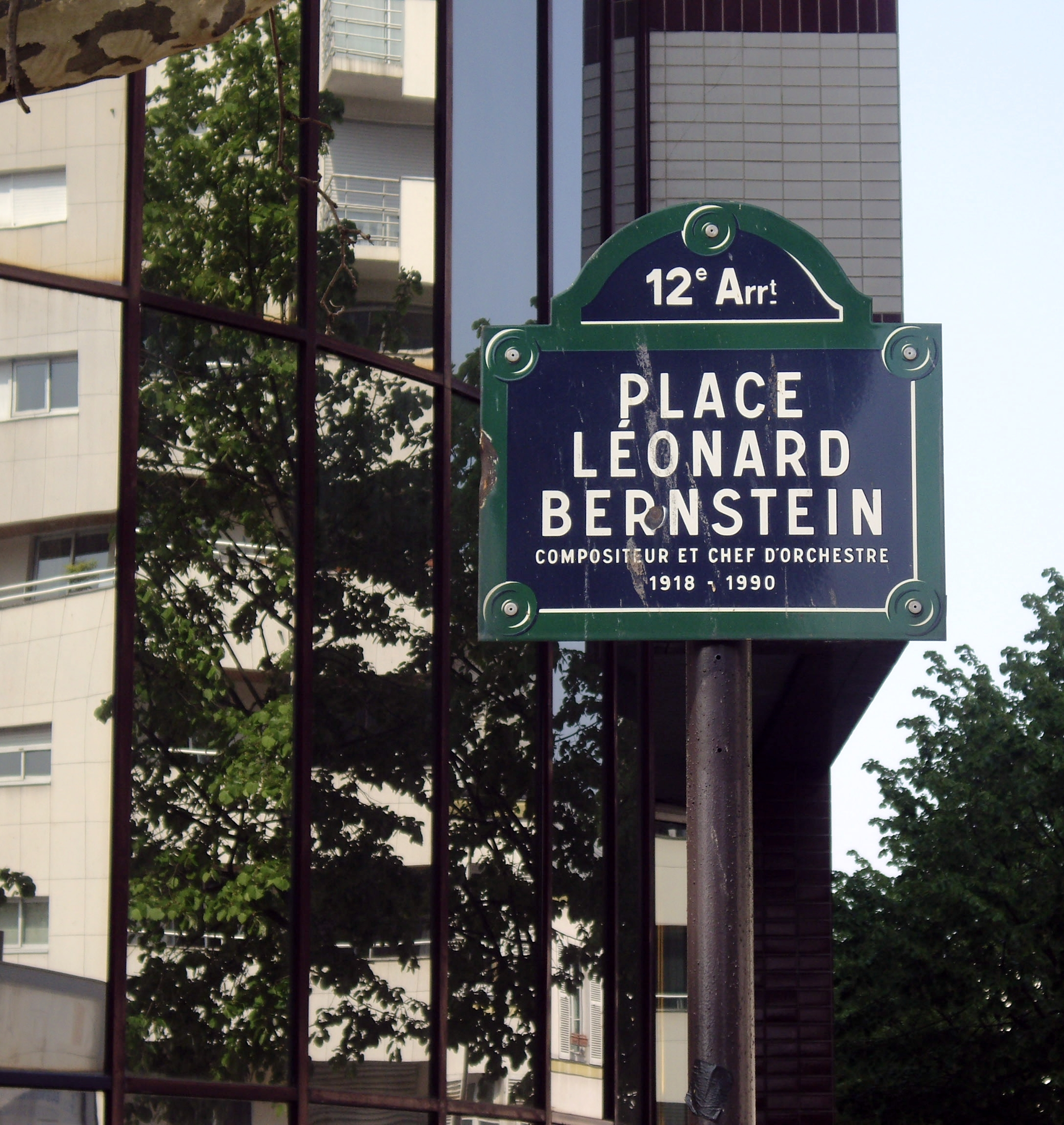
Place Léonard-Bernstein, a square in the 12th arrondissement of Paris

== Social activism and humanitarian efforts ==
Since earliest adulthood, Bernstein was committed to furthering social change and making the world a better place. Throughout his life, Bernstein fought for a variety of political and humanitarian causes, from the civil rights movement to the Vietnam War protests to nuclear disarmament to advocacy during the AIDS crisis.

Bernstein's first public efforts for social change became apparent in 1939 when, as a college student at Harvard, he organized and led a performance of Marc Blitzstein's recently banned musical, The Cradle Will Rock, about the struggles of the working class.

=== FBI file ===
Bernstein was involved in numerous left-wing causes and organizations since the 1940s, at which time the FBI began its decades-long monitoring of Bernstein's activities "for his ties to communist organizations." In the 1980s, through the Freedom of Information Act, he was able to view his FBI file, which was over 800 pages long. In the early 1950s, he was briefly blacklisted by the United States Department of State and CBS, but he was never asked to testify before the House Un-American Activities Committee.

=== Civil rights ===
Bernstein expressed his support of civil rights in the United States in numerous ways. Some examples include multiracial casting in On the Town in the 1940s, instigating blind auditions at the New York Philharmonic in the 1960s and the robust support of artists of color in classical music.

On March 24, 1965, at the invitation of Harry Belafonte, Bernstein participated in the Stars for Freedom Rally, a star-studded performance in support of the marchers heading from Selma to Montgomery to demand voting rights. The next day, Martin Luther King Jr., the leader of the march, delivered one of his most famous speeches, "How Long, Not Long".

==== "Radical Chic" ====
On January 14, 1970, Bernstein and his wife Felicia held an event at their Manhattan apartment seeking to raise awareness and funds for the defense of members of the Black Panther Party, known as the Panther 21. The New York Times initially covered the gathering in its society section, but later published an editorial harshly unfavorable to Bernstein.

The story became widely publicized, climaxing in June of that year with the appearance of "Radical Chic: That Party at Lenny's", a cover story by journalist Tom Wolfe in New York Magazine. The article led to the popularization of the pejorative term "radical chic". Bernstein and his wife Felicia received hate mail, and their building was picketed by Jewish Defense League protesters. Bernstein's FBI file later revealed that the bureau had generated the letters, and had implanted agents to make the protests look more substantial.

=== Anti-Vietnam war efforts ===
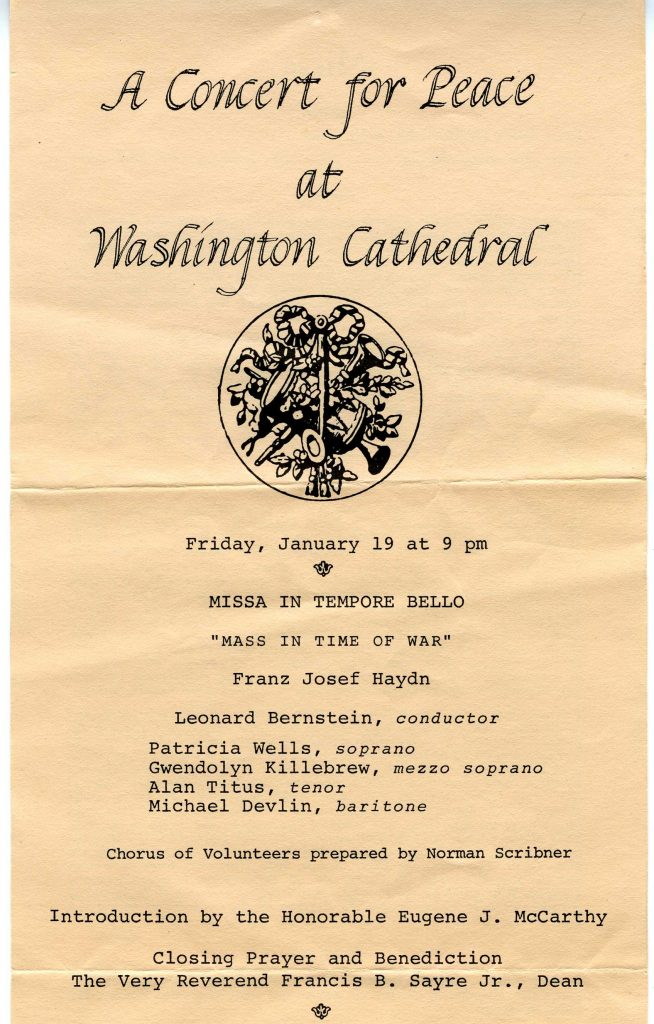
Program from "A Concert For Peace at Washington Cathedral", January 19, 1973

On January 21, 1968, Bernstein and Paul Newman co-hosted "Broadway for Peace" at Lincoln Center's Philharmonic Hall to support the Congressional Peace Campaign Committee, which funded congressional campaigns opposing the Vietnam War. For the occasion, Bernstein composed a song, "So Pretty", sung by Barbra Streisand accompanied by Bernstein on the piano.

On January 19, 1973, Bernstein conducted members of the National Symphony Orchestra in a "Concert of Peace" at the Washington National Cathedral. The free performance of Haydn's Mass in Time of War, which took place on the eve of the second inauguration of Richard Nixon, was in protest of Nixon's failure to bring an end to the Vietnam War.

=== Rostropovich and the Soviet Union ===
Bernstein played a key role in the release of renowned cellist and conductor Mstislav Rostropovich from the USSR in 1974. Rostropovich, a strong believer in free speech and democracy, had been officially held in disgrace; his concerts and tours both at home and abroad cancelled; and in 1972 he was prohibited to travel outside of the Soviet Union. During a trip to the USSR in 1974, U.S. senator from Massachusetts Ted Kennedy and his wife Joan, urged by Bernstein and others in the cultural sphere, mentioned Rostropovich's situation to Leonid Brezhnev, the Soviet Union Communist Party Leader. Two days later, Rostropovich was granted his exit visa.

=== Nuclear disarmament ===
Bernstein was a committed and outspoken supporter of nuclear disarmament. In 1980, he gave a commencement speech at Johns Hopkins University warning the graduating class of the dangers of nuclear proliferation. In 1983, he dedicated the activities surrounding his 65th birthday to the issue of nuclear disarmament. In 1985, he brought the European Community Youth Orchestra on a "Journey for Peace" tour across Europe and Japan, performing at the Hiroshima Peace Ceremony to commemorate the 40th anniversary of the bombing.

=== Advocacy for AIDS research and patient care ===
In the 1980s, Bernstein was frustrated that the Reagan Administration took so long to acknowledge the existence of the AIDS epidemic, let alone provide resources for research and patient care. Bernstein was galvanized to provide advocacy however he could. In a written statement for a June 1983 benefit for AIDS advocacy in Houston, Bernstein wrote: "AIDS is not, repeat not, the Gay Plague it is so often made out to be; it is part of the human condition, and must be universally researched and annihilated."

On April 30, 1983, at Madison Square Garden in New York City, Bernstein participated in one of the earliest HIV / AIDS fundraisers, which raised over $250,000 for the Gay Men's Health Crisis (GMHC). Bernstein conducted the Ringling Bros. and Barnum & Bailey Circus Orchestra with mezzo-soprano Shirley Verrett in "The Star-Spangled Banner".

On November 8, 1987, Bernstein participated in another event to benefit the Gay Men's Health Crisis. The concert at Carnegie Hall, "Music for Life", was dedicated to Dr. Mathilde Krim and her work at the American Foundation for AIDS Research (amFAR). Bernstein was joined by Leontyne Price, Marilyn Horne, Luciano Pavarotti, and Yo-Yo Ma, among others.

On November 15, 1989, Bernstein refused the National Medal of Arts from President George H. W. Bush in protest against the revoked National Endowment for the Arts grant for a New York exhibit of AIDS-related art.

=== Philanthropy ===
Bernstein funded a variety of fellowships, funds, and scholarships including ones at the Tanglewood Music Center, Jacobs School of Music, Brandeis University, and the ASCAP Foundation. Several of these funds were named for his late wife Felicia Montealegre, including scholarships at the Juilliard School, Columbia University School of the Arts, New York University Tisch School of the Arts, and the Felicia Montealegre Bernstein Fund of Amnesty International USA.

Bernstein had a lifelong interest in integrating the arts into general education. When he won the Japan Art Association's Praemium Imperiale award in 1990, Bernstein used the $100,000 prize money to initiate a project in Nashville, Tennessee that would eventually lead to the current nationwide teaching model known as Artful Learning.

== Influence and characteristics ==
=== As a conductor ===
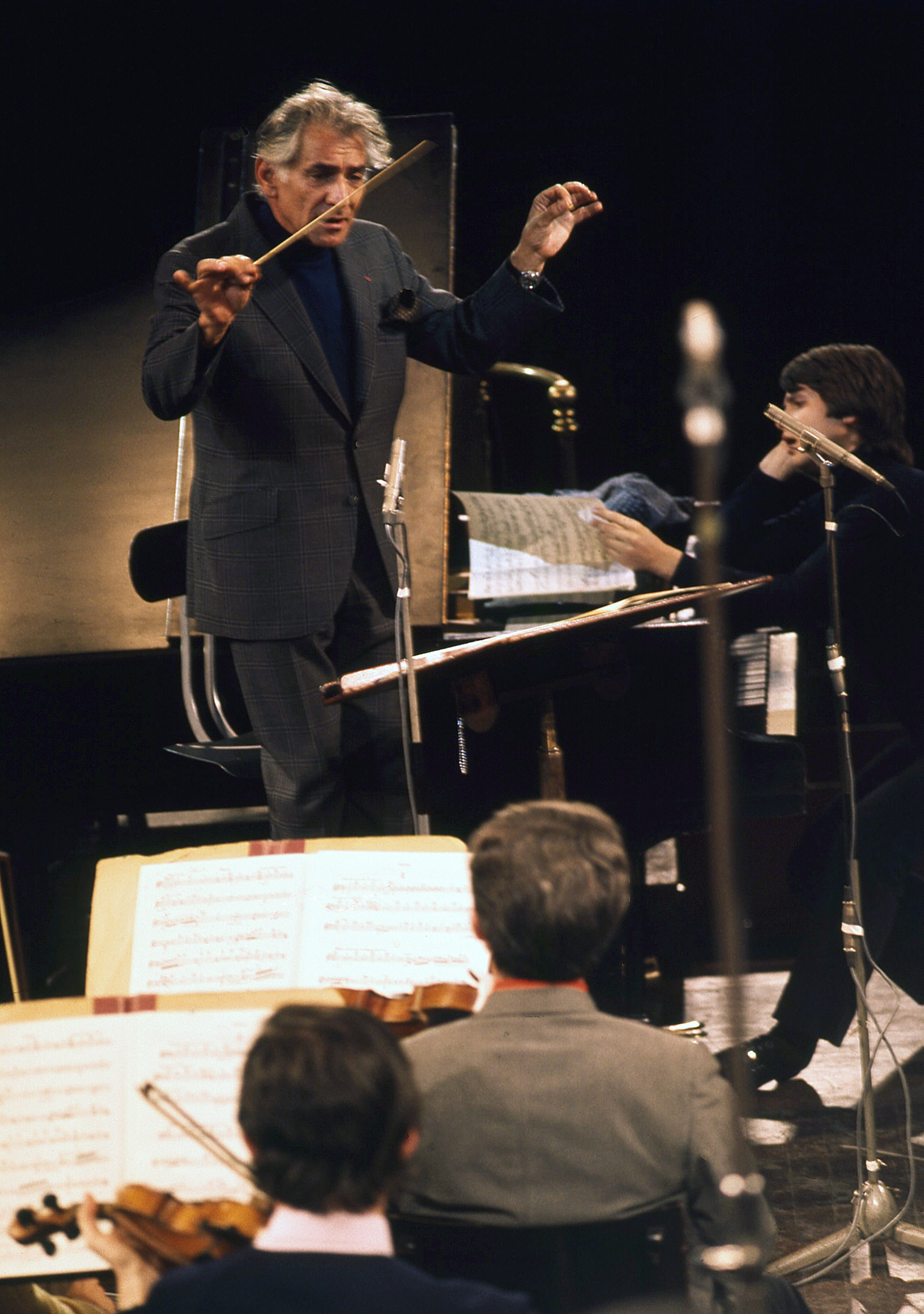
Leonard Bernstein rehearsing at the Royal Albert Hall, London, 1973

Leonard Bernstein was one of the most significant conductors of the 20th century. He was held in high regard by musicians around the world, including the members of the New York Philharmonic, which he led for eleven seasons; the Vienna Philharmonic, where he received an honorary membership; the Boston Symphony Orchestra, which he conducted principally at Tanglewood for over 50 years; the London Symphony Orchestra, of which he was president; and the Israel Philharmonic Orchestra, where he appeared regularly as their guest conductor. Audiences worldwide eagerly anticipated Bernstein's performances, from New York to Tokyo to Caracas to Sydney.

In 1943, Bernstein's last-minute conducting debut in Carnegie Hall with the New York Philharmonic, which was broadcast live nationwide, caused him to become famous overnight. He soon became the first American-born, American-trained conductor to achieve international status, at a time when conductors traditionally came from Europe.

Bernstein's three major conducting mentors were Serge Koussevitzky, Dimitri Mitropoulos, and Fritz Reiner. Bernstein's conducting was characterized by his physically expressive podium manner. Orchestra members often remarked that Bernstein's every gesture conveyed a specific musical communication for them.

Bernstein performed a wide classical music repertoire from the Baroque era to the music of his time. Bernstein conducted and recorded definitive interpretations of works by traditional composers such as Haydn, Beethoven, Brahms, Schumann, and Tchaikovsky; championed music by lesser known composers such as Mahler, Sibelius, and Nielsen; and advocated modern composers such as Stravinsky, Hindemith, Shostakovich, and Ligeti. Bernstein programmed American composers everywhere in the world that he conducted, sharing the music of Gershwin, Copland, and Ives. He expanded the definitions of the genres that could be included in the concert hall by programming jazz, musical theater, and works from Latin America.

A skilled pianist, he often conducted piano concertos from the keyboard, including works by Gershwin, Mozart, Beethoven, and Ravel.

Bernstein was also an influential conducting teacher and mentor. During his many years at Tanglewood, Schleswig-Holstein and elsewhere, Bernstein directly influenced many young conductors, including Seiji Ozawa, Claudio Abbado, Lorin Maazel, Marin Alsop, Michael Tilson Thomas, James DePreist, Edo de Waart, Eiji Oue, JoAnn Falletta, Yutaka Sado, Maurice Peress, Carl St. Clair, John Mauceri, Alexander Frey, and Jaap van Zweden.

=== As an educator ===
Bernstein's impact as an educator stretched far beyond his music students. Through the medium of television, Bernstein introduced millions of viewers worldwide to symphonic music. His Young People's Concerts with the New York Philharmonic brought in younger viewers, while his Omnibus, Ford Presents, and Lincoln Presents brought musical concepts to general audiences.

In the 1950s, Bernstein taught at Brandeis University for several years, and founded their Festival of the Creative Arts, which the institution later named after him. Over the course of his career, Bernstein taught at numerous locations worldwide, including at the Tanglewood Institute, and founded three summer festivals of his own: Los Angeles Philharmonic Institute, Orchestral Academy of the Schleswig-Holstein Musik Festival, and the Pacific Music Festival.

=== As a composer ===
Bernstein's music combined genres and musical styles. He wove together elements of classical, jazz, popular, Broadway, Latin, Jewish music, and more to create a musical fabric uniquely his own.

Bernstein's Jewish influences are clearly audible in both his symphonic and theatre works. Two of his symphonies, Symphony No. 1: "Jeremiah" and Symphony No. 3: "Kaddish", incorporated Hebrew texts and sources, as did his Chichester Psalms, Hashkiveinu, Four Sabras, Halil, and Dybbuk. In two of his theatre works, Candide and West Side Story, the call of the shofar can clearly be heard in the score. Bernstein occasionally turned to Christian sources as well, for example in his Missa Brevis and his theatre work MASS.

Among the 20th century composers who influenced Bernstein were Aaron Copland, Igor Stravinsky, Maurice Ravel, George Gershwin, and Marc Blitzstein. Bernstein's score for West Side Story incorporated multiple elements from classical, Latin-Caribbean, and bebop jazz. While his music was rooted in tonality, many of his works incorporated 12-tone elements – from the atonal score of the ballet Dybbuk to his Symphony No. 3: "Kaddish".

Bernstein's Broadway shows — West Side Story, On the Town, Wonderful Town, and Candide — as well as his theatre piece MASS continue to be produced worldwide. In addition to his works for the stage, all three of his symphonies, his Serenade, and his song cycles, including Songfest and Arias and Barcaroles, are inspired by theatrical and literary sources. Bernstein himself said that virtually all his compositions "could in some sense be thought of as 'theatre' pieces".

Bernstein's keen sense of rhythm lent his compositions readily to use for ballet and other dance forms. In addition to his own ballets — Fancy Free, Facsimile, and Dybbuk — and musicals, many works were choreographed in his lifetime, as well as afterward, for both stage and film. Choreographers of Bernstein's music include Jerome Robbins, Alvin Ailey, John Neumeier, Alexei Ratmansky, Anne Teresa De Keersmaeker, Larry Keigwin, and Justin Peck.

The eclectic nature of Bernstein's music often generated criticism, particularly from the academic community of the mid-20th century where the Second Viennese School and its 12-tone approach held sway. Bernstein received additional criticism for his theatre work MASS, which some members of the Catholic Church considered offensive. The work's thinly veiled antiwar stance was enough to prevent President Richard Nixon from attending the premiere at the 1971 opening of the Kennedy Center for the Performing Arts in Washington, D.C. While his eclecticism, as well as his fearlessness in taking on social issues, generated controversy in his lifetime, Bernstein is now considered a hero and role model for the next generation of composers.

Despite frequent criticism in his lifetime, Bernstein's music has endured into the 21st century and is regularly performed, discussed, and recorded around the world. In 2008–09, his 90th anniversary year, Bernstein was the second-most frequently performed American composer (behind Aaron Copland). In 2018, his centennial year, Bernstein was the third-most played composer worldwide for the year, alongside Beethoven, Mozart, Bach, and Brahms. That year, four of the five most-played concert works worldwide were Bernstein compositions: Symphonic Dances from West Side Story, Overture to Candide, Serenade (after Plato's Symposium), and Chichester Psalms.

== Audio recordings ==
Between 1945 and 1950, Bernstein recorded a variety of works for RCA Victor, primarily consisting of his own compositions and those of other American composers. During this time, he also recorded for Decca Records and Hargail Records. His recordings for Decca Records contains some "musical analysis" recordings in a form similar to his Young People's Concerts.

On April 2, 1956, Bernstein signed his first long-term contract with Columbia Records regarding services as conductor, piano soloist, and as commentator. Between 1956 and 1979, Bernstein recorded over 500 compositions for Columbia, 455 of which were recorded with the New York Philharmonic. Bernstein's typical pattern of recording at that time was to record major works in the studio immediately following the orchestra's subscription concerts or on one of the Young People's Concerts. Any spare studio time that remained was used to record short orchestral showpieces and other works.

In 1990, Sony Classical acquired Columbia/CBS Records. Between 1992 and 1993, Sony reissued and digitally remastered Bernstein's complete Columbia catalog as part of a 100-volume, 125-CD "Royal Edition", featuring watercolors by Charles, Prince of Wales on the covers.

Between 1997 and 2001, Sony issued the "Bernstein Century" series, which was a combination of new re-releases and items from the "Royal Edition". The rights to Bernstein's RCA Victor recordings became owned by Sony following its 2008 acquisition of Bertelsmann Music Group (BMG). The complete Bernstein Columbia and RCA Victor catalog was reissued on CD in a three-volume series of box sets (released in 2010, 2014, and 2018, respectively) comprising a total of 198 discs under the mantle "Leonard Bernstein Edition".

In 1972, Bernstein made his first recording for Deutsche Grammophon: Bizet's Carmen. On October 17, 1976, Bernstein made his first live recording on Deutsche Grammophon, leading to a 14-year collaboration until his death in 1990. The vast majority of the DG recordings were of live performances, which had become Bernstein's preferred approach to recording. From the 1970s onward, Bernstein's audio recordings were supplemented with films produced by Amberson Productions and Unitel, which were subsequently released on LaserDisc and DVD.

Bernstein recorded for other labels as well. Notable exceptions include recordings of Gustav Mahler's Song of the Earth and Mozart's 15th piano concerto and "Linz" symphony with the Vienna Philharmonic for Decca Records (1966); Berlioz's Symphonie fantastique and Harold en Italie (1976) for EMI; and Wagner's Tristan und Isolde (1981) for Philips Records. In total, Bernstein received 63 Grammy Award nominations and was awarded 16 Grammys in various categories, including for posthumously released recordings. He was awarded a Lifetime Achievement Grammy in 1985.

== Written works ==
- Bernstein, Leonard (1993) [1982]. Findings. New York: Anchor Books. ISBN 978-0-385-42437-0.
- — (1993) [1966]. The Infinite Variety of Music. New York: Anchor Books. ISBN 978-0-385-42438-7.
- — (2004) [1959]. The Joy of Music. Pompton Plains, New Jersey: Amadeus Press. ISBN 978-1-57467-104-9.
- — (2006) [1962]. Young People's Concerts. Milwaukee; Cambridge: Amadeus Press. ISBN 978-1-57467-102-5.
- — (1976). The Unanswered Question: Six Talks at Harvard. Harvard University Press. ISBN 978-0-674-92001-9.
- — (2013). The Leonard Bernstein Letters (paperback). Yale University Press. ISBN 978-0-300-20544-2. Archived from the original on September 8, 2021.

== Videography ==
- The Unanswered Question: Six Talks at Harvard. West Long Branch, New Jersey: Kultur Video. VHS ISBN 978-1-56127-570-0. DVD ISBN 978-0-7697-1570-4. (videotape of the Charles Eliot Norton Lectures given at Harvard in 1973.)
- Leonard Bernstein's Young People's Concerts with the New York Philharmonic. West Long Branch, New Jersey: Kultur Video. DVD ISBN 978-0-7697-1503-2.
- Bernstein on Beethoven: A Celebration in Vienna/Beethoven: Piano Concerto No. 1. West Long Branch, Kultur Video. DVD
- Leonard Bernstein: Omnibus – The Historic TV Broadcasts, 2010, E1 Ent.
- Rosen, Peter (1978). Bernstein: Reflections (DVD). Euroarts.
- Bernstein/Beethoven (1982), Deutsche Grammophon, DVD
- The Metropolitan Opera Centennial Gala (1983), Deutsche Grammophon, DVD 00440–073–4538
- Bernstein Conducts "West Side Story" (1985) (retitled The Making of West Side Story in re-releases) Deutsche Grammophon. DVD
- "The Rite of Spring" in Rehearsal (1996), Kultur, VHS
- Mozart's Great Mass in C minor, Exsultate, jubilate & Ave verum corpus (1990), Deutsche Grammophon. DVD 00440–073–4240
- "Leonard Bernstein: Reaching for the Note" (1998) Documentary on his life and music. Originally aired on PBS's American Masters series. DVD
- Maestro (2023). Movie directed by and starring Bradley Cooper as Bernstein. "'Maestro' Review: Leonard Bernstein's Life of Ecstasy and Agony"
- Bernstein's Wall (2026) Documentary that "makes an argument about the urgent necessity of promoting art for the preservation of democracy, and it uses Bernstein as the spokesman for that case, in his own words. In fact, the new documentary is entirely narrated by Bernstein, using footage from archival interviews." "Zeroing In on the Joy Leonard Bernstein Found in Music"

== Awards and honors ==
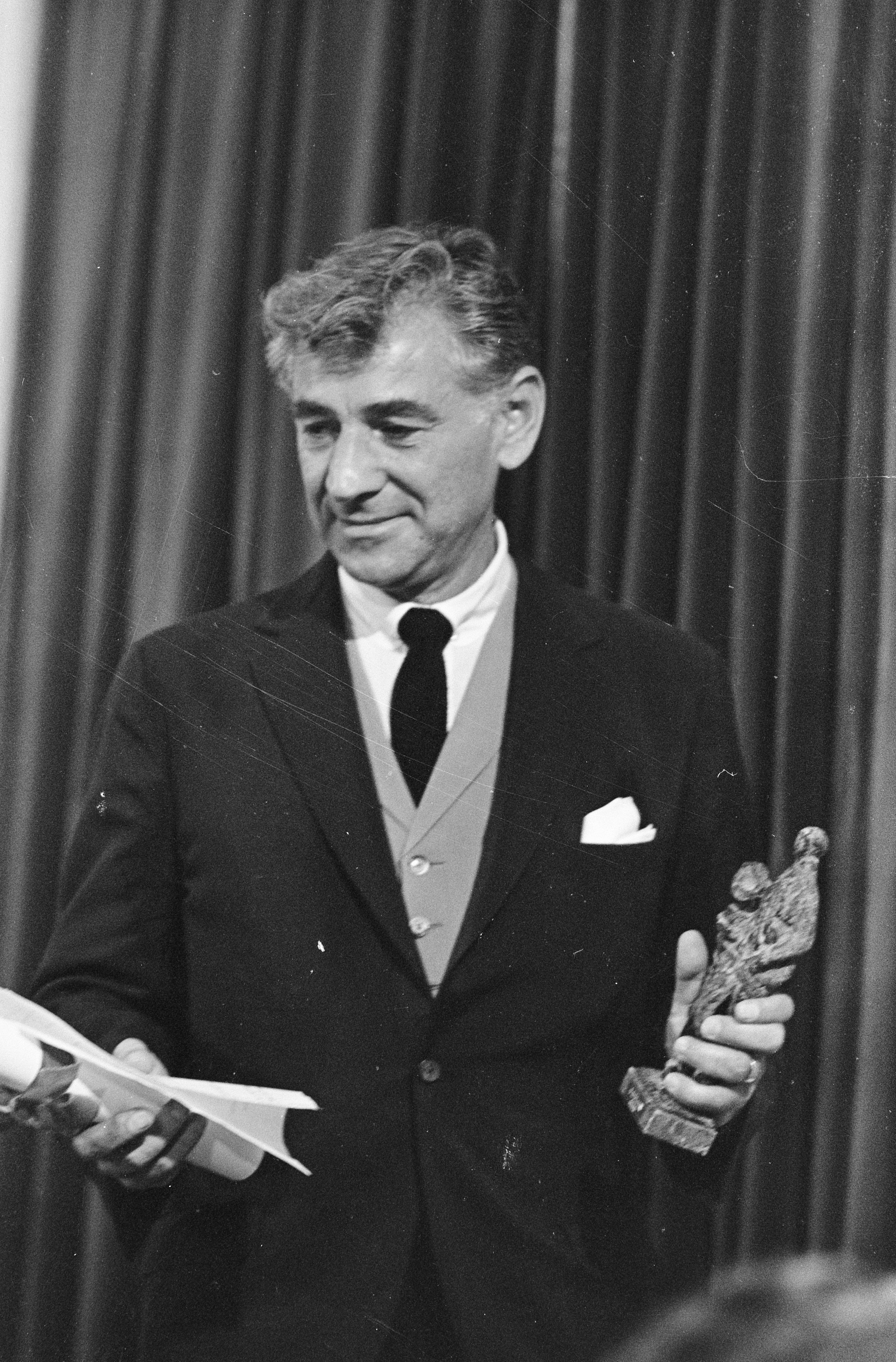
Leonard Bernstein receiving the Edison Classical Music Award, 1968

Over the course of his distinguished career, Bernstein has received seven Emmy Awards, two Tony Awards, and 16 Grammy Awards as well as a nomination for an Academy Award. Bernstein is also a member of both the American Theater Hall of Fame and the Television Hall of Fame. In 1998, Bernstein was inducted into the American Classical Music Hall of Fame.; in 2015, he was inducted into the Legacy Walk.

- Fellow of the American Academy of Arts and Sciences, 1951
- Fellow at the MacDowell 1962, 1970, 1972
- Sonning Award (Denmark), 1965
- Ditson Conductor's Award, 1958
- George Peabody Medal – Johns Hopkins University, 1980
- Ernst von Siemens Music Prize, 1987
- Royal Philharmonic Society Gold Medal (UK), 1987
- Edward MacDowell Medal, 1987
- Knight Grand Cross Order of Merit (Italy), 1989
- Grammy Award for Best Album for Children
- Grammy Award for Best Orchestral Performance
- Grammy Award for Best Choral Performance
- Grammy Award for Best Opera Recording
- Grammy Award for Best Classical Vocal Performance
- Grammy Award for Best Instrumental Soloist(s) Performance
- Grammy Award for Best Classical Contemporary Composition
- Grammy Award for Best Classical Album
- Grammy Lifetime Achievement Award
- Tony Award for Best Musical, 1953
- Special Tony Award, 1969
- Japan Arts Association Lifetime Achievement Award
- Gramophone Hall of Fame entrant
- Commandeur de la Légion d'honneur, 1986
- Praemium Imperiale, 1990
