= Hashkiveinu (Bernstein) =

Composition by Leonard Bernstein

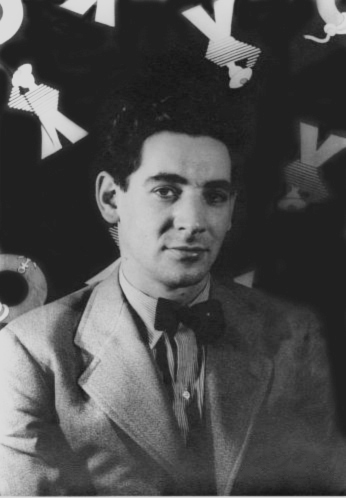
Leonard Bernstein in 1944

Hashkiveinu is a work for solo cantor (tenor), mixed chorus, and organ composed by Leonard Bernstein in 1945. The work is six minutes in length and uses the prayer text from the Jewish Sabbath evening service. The work is in Hebrew, and the transliterated score uses Ashkenazic pronunciation.

== Commissioning ==
Hashkiveinu is the result of a commissioning project from 1943 to 1976 by Cantor Dr. David Putterman for a series of contemporary music at Park Avenue Synagogue in New York City. Putterman believed strongly that the synagogue music—particularly American synagogue music—would only endure through adaptation and creativity. In the preface to Synagogue Music by Contemporary Composers, Putterman wrote:

The Jewish prayer-book of today is the result of development through the ages and reflects the Jewish spirit of these ages; similarly, the music of the Synagogue is a veritable growing treasure from Biblical times to present. The music contained in this volume is not meant to replace the traditional fixed prayer modes, but is rather intended to enrich the music of our time.

At the time of the commissioning, the rabbi of Park Avenue Synagogue was Milton Steinberg. Steinberg wrote, "The preservation and recapture of the past of Jewish music. The adaptation of it to the musical present. The stimulation of new Jewish musical creativity.”

== Premiere ==
Bernstein's Hashkiveinu was first performed on May 11, 1945 at the Park Avenue Synagogue with Cantor Putterman. Noel Straus reviewed, “Mr. Bernstein's extensive Hashkiveinu (Prayer for Divine Protection) was remarkable for its dramatic forcefulness, its coloring and sharp contrasts of dynamics and mood.”

== Structure ==
The outer sections are dominated by the cantorial soloist and imitative choral entrances in Phrygian mode. The canonic heterophony, however, maintains relative stasis and calm evoking the peaceful, nighttime elements of the prayer. The a cappella middle section is composed polychorally with Stravinsky-like rhythmic intensity.
