= List of compositions by Leonard Bernstein =

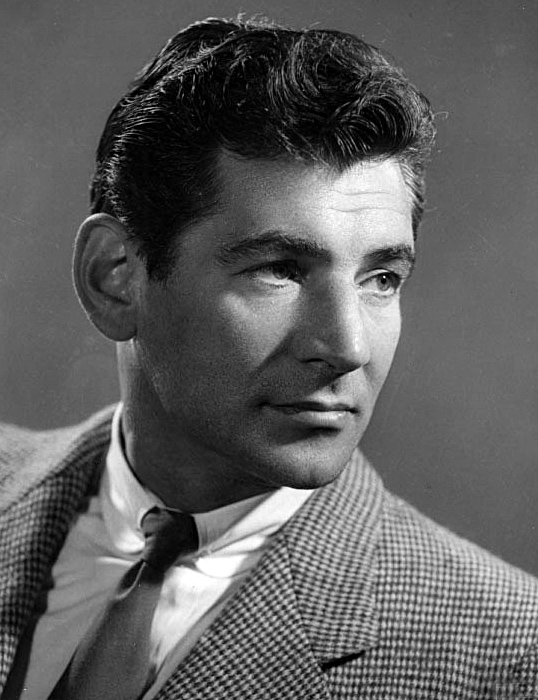
Leonard Bernstein, ca. 1950s.

This is a list of compositions by the American composer Leonard Bernstein.

== Ballet ==
- Fancy Free (later provided material for "On the Town" and "West Side Story") (1944)
- Facsimile, Choreographic Essay for Orchestra (1946)
- Dybbuk (1974)

== Opera ==
- Trouble in Tahiti (1951)
- Candide (1956, new libretto in 1973, operetta final revised version in 1989)
- A Quiet Place (1983)

== Musicals ==
- On the Town (1944)
- Peter Pan (1950)
- Wonderful Town (1953)
- West Side Story (1957)
- A Party with Betty Comden and Adolph Green (1958, collaboration)
- The Race to Urga (1969 - incomplete)
- "By Bernstein" (a Revue) (1975)
- 1600 Pennsylvania Avenue (1976)
- The Madwoman of Central Park West (contributed to 1979)

== Incidental music and other theatre ==
- The Birds (1938)
- The Peace (1940)
- The Lark (1955)
- Salome, for Chamber Orchestra and Solo Voices
- The Firstborn, for Voice and Percussion (1958)
- MASS: A Theatre Piece for Singers, Players, and Dancers (1971)

== Film scores ==
- On the Town (1949) (only part of his music was used)
- On the Waterfront (1954)
- West Side Story (1961)

== Orchestral ==
- Symphony No. 1 Jeremiah (1942)
- Suite from Fancy Free (concert premiere 1945)
- Three Dance Episodes from "On the Town" (concert premiere 1946)
- Symphony No. 2 The Age of Anxiety (after W. H. Auden) for Piano and Orchestra (1949, revised in 1965)
- Prelude, Fugue, and Riffs, for Solo Clarinet and Jazz Ensemble (1949)
- Serenade after Plato's "Symposium" (1954)
- Symphonic Suite from On the Waterfront (1955)
- Overture to Candide (1956)
- Symphonic Dances from West Side Story (1960)
- Fanfare for the Inauguration of John F. Kennedy, (for the inauguration of John F. Kennedy) for Orchestra (1961)
- Fanfare II, (for the 25th anniversary of the High School of Music and Art) for Orchestra (1961)
- Symphony No. 3 Kaddish, for Orchestra, Mixed Chorus, Boys' Choir, Speaker and Soprano Solo (1963, revised in 1977)
- Three Meditations from "Mass", for Orchestra (1972)
- Dybbuk, Suites No. 1 and 2, for Orchestra (Originally Dybbuk Variations from 1974, concert premieres 1975 and 1977)
- Songfest: A Cycle of American Poems for Six Singers and Orchestra (1977)
- Three Meditations from "Mass", for Violoncello and Orchestra (1977)
- Slava! A Political Overture, for Orchestra (1977)
- CBS Music, for Orchestra (1977)
- Divertimento for Orchestra (1980)
- A Musical Toast, for Orchestra (1980)
- Halil, nocturne for Solo Flute, Piccolo, Alto Flute, Percussion, Harp and Strings (1981)
- Opening Prayer (originally Jubilee Games from 1986, revised in 1988 and 1989)

== Choral ==
- Hashkivenu, for Cantor (tenor), Mixed Chorus and Organ (1945)
- Simchu Na, arrangement of a traditional Hebrew song for Mixed Chorus and Piano or Orchestra (1947)
- Reena, arrangement of a traditional Hebrew song for Mixed Chorus and Orchestra (1947)
- Yigdal, Hebrew liturgical melody for Mixed Chorus and piano (1950)
- Harvard Choruses, for Mixed Chorus (1957)
- Chichester Psalms, for Boy Soprano (or Countertenor), Mixed Chorus, and Orchestra (Reduced version for Organ, Harp and Percussion) (1965)
- Warm-Up, round for Mixed Chorus (1970)
- A Little Norton Lecture, (after E. E. Cummings) for Men's Chorus (1973)
- White House Cantata, for Soprano, Mezzo-Soprano, Tenor, Bass, Mixed Chorus and Orchestra (1976). See 1600 Pennsylvania Avenue (musical).
- Olympic Hymn, for Mixed Chorus and Orchestra (1981)
- Missa Brevis, for Mixed Chorus and Countertenor Solo, with Percussion (1988)

== Chamber music ==
- Music for String Quartet (1936, edited by Garth Edwin Sunderland)
- Piano Trio (1937)
- Violin Sonata (1940)
- Four Studies for two Clarinets, two Bassoons and Piano (c. 1940)
- Sonata for Clarinet and Piano (1942)
- Fanfare for Bima, for Brass Quartet (composed as a birthday tribute to Koussevitzky using the tune he whistled to call his cocker spaniel) (1948)
- Elegy for Mippy I, for Horn and Piano (1948)
- Elegy for Mippy II, for Trombone Solo (1948)
- Waltz for Mippy III, for Tuba and Piano (1948)
- Rondo for Lifey, for Trumpet and Piano (1948)
- Shivaree: A Fanfare, for Double Brass Ensemble and Percussion (commissioned by and dedicated to the Metropolitan Museum of Art in New York in honor of its Centenary; musical material later used in "Mass.") (1969)
- Canon for Aaron for Violin and Piano; Composed for Aaron Copland's 70th birthday celebrations (1970)
- Dance Suite, for Brass Quintet (1989)
- Variations on an Octatonic Scale, for Recorder and Violoncello (1989)

== Vocal music ==
- Psalm 148, for voice and piano (1935)
- I Hate Music: A cycle of Five Kid Songs for Soprano and Piano (1943)
- Big Stuff, sung by Billie Holiday (1944)
- Afterthought, study for the ballet "Facsimile" for Soprano and Piano or Orchestra (1945)
- La Bonne Cuisine: Four Recipes for Voice and Piano (1947)
- Two Love Songs on Poems by Rainer Maria Rilke for Voice and Piano (1949)
- Silhouette (Galilee), for Voice and Piano (1951)
- On the Waterfront, for Voice and Piano (1954)
- Get Hep!, Marching Song written for the Tercentary of Michigan State College for Voice and Piano (1955)
- So Pretty, for Voice and Piano (1968)
- Haiku Souvenirs, five songs for voice and piano
- Vayomer Elohim, for Voice and Piano (1974)
- My New Friends, for Voice and Piano (1979)
- Piccola Serenata, for Voice and Piano (1979)
- Opening Prayer, for Baritone and Orchestra (written for the reopening of Carnegie Hall) (1986)
- Arias and Barcarolles, for Mezzo-Soprano, Baritone and Piano four-hands (1988)
- My Twelve Tone Melody, for Voice and Piano (written for Irving Berlin's 100th birthday) (1988)

== Piano music ==
- Music for Two Pianos (1937)
- Non troppo presto (Music for the Dance No. I) (1938)
- Sonata for the Piano (1938)
- Music for the Dance No. II (1938)
- Scenes from the City of Sin, eight miniatures for Piano four-hands (1939)
- Arrangement of Aaron Copland's El Salón México for piano or two pianos (1941)
- Seven Anniversaries (1943)
- Four Anniversaries (1948)
- Four Sabras (1950)
- Five Anniversaries (1951)
- Bridal Suite (1960)
- Moby Diptych (1981) (republished as Anniversaries nos. 1 and 2 in Thirteen Anniversaries)
- Touches (1981)
- Thirteen Anniversaries (1988)

== Other music ==
- Babel: a holocaust opera
- The Caucasian Chalk Circle, Songs after Bertold Brecht
- The Skin of Our Teeth (1964): an aborted work from which Bernstein took material to use in his "Chichester Psalms"
- Alarums and Flourishes (1980): an aborted work from which Bernstein took material to use in "A Quiet Place"
- Tucker: an aborted concept for a musical version of the 1988 film "Tucker: The Man and His Dream"

== Sources ==
Bernstein, Leonard (1982). Findings. New York: Simon and Schuster. ISBN 0-671-42919-1.
