= Anniversaries (Bernstein) =

Series of short compositions by Leonard Bernstein

The Anniversaries are a series of short compositions of easy difficulty for solo piano by American composer Leonard Bernstein. These compositions were written over the course of forty years as gifts for people Bernstein was acquainted or friends with on the occasion of their birthday. The published series comprises the following works:

- Seven Anniversaries (1942—43)
1. "For Aaron Copland (Nov. 14, 1900)"
2. "For My Sister, Shirley (Oct. 3, 1923)"
3. "In Memoriam: Alfred Eisner (Jan. 4, 1941)"
4. "For Paul Bowles (Dec. 31, 1910)"
5. "In Memoriam: Nathalie Koussevitzky (Jan. 15, 1942)"
6. "For Sergei Koussevitzky (July 26, 1874)"
7. "For William Schuman (Aug. 4, 1910)"
- Four Anniversaries (1948)
1. "For Felicia Montealegre (February 6, 1922)"
2. "For Johnny Mehegan (June 6, 1920)"
3. "For David Diamond (July 9, 1915)"
4. "For Helen Coates (July 19, 1899)"
* Five Anniversaries (1949–51)
1. "For Elizabeth Rudolf (born Jan. 23, 1894)"
2. "For Lukas Foss (born Aug. 15, 1922)"
3. "For Elizabeth B. Ehrman (born Jan. 22, 1883)"
4. "For Sandy Gellhorn (born April 23, 1951)"
5. "For Susanna Kyle (born July 24, 1949)"
- Thirteen Anniversaries (1988)
1. For Shirley Gabis Rhoades Perle
2. In Memoriam: William Kapell
3. For Stephen Sondheim
4. For Craig Urquhart
5. For Leo Smit
6. For My Daughter, Nina
7. In Memoriam: Helen Coates
8. In Memoriam: Goddard Lieberson
9. For Jessica Fleishmann
10. In Memoriam: Constance Hope
11. For Felicia, on our 28th Birthday (and her 52nd)
12. For Aaron Stern
13. In Memoriam: Ellen Goetz

Bernstein composed many more anniversaries that eventually fell out of interest and were abandoned and never re-used in other compositions. Examples of anniversaries that were used in other compositions include No. 1 in Four Sabras, which was never included in the anniversaries series.

== Anniversaries for Orchestra ==
In 2016, long-time Bernstein championeer Garth Edwin Sunderland wrote a suite entitled Anniversaries for Orchestra. The collection of eleven anniversaries was taken from the four different sets and was arranged for a large orchestra. The piece had a total duration of 15 minutes and was scored for two flutes (with two piccolos), two oboes (second oboe doubling English horn), two clarinets in B♭ (first clarinet doubling clarinet in E♭, second clarinet doubling bass clarinet), two bassoons (second bassoon doubling contrabassoon), two horns in F, two trumpets in C, two trombones (second trombone doubling bass trombone), timpani, two percussionists (playing a glockenspiel, a xylophone, a vibraphone, chimes, a triangle, suspended cymbals, a tam-tam, a tambourine, a snare drum, a field drum, and a bass drum), and a regular-sized string section. It was first recorded under Naxos with Marin Alsop and the São Paulo State Symphony Orchestra.

== See also ==
- List of compositions by Leonard Bernstein
