= Opus Two =

American violin and piano duo

- Origin: Boulder, Colorado, US
- Genres: Classical
- Occupation: Musicians
- Instrument(s): classical violin and classical piano
- Years active: 1993 to present
- Members: William Terwilliger; Andrew Cooperstock
- Website: www.opustwo.org

Opus Two is an American violin and piano chamber music ensemble featuring violinist William Terwilliger and pianist Andrew Cooperstock. They are known for their contributions to the violin-piano duo repertoire and their performances and recordings of original American music for violin and piano.

== Performances ==
Opus Two performs and records in many styles including classical, Broadway theatre, and Latin. Their performances have highlighted original music written for piano and violin by American composers such as Aaron Copland, Leonard Bernstein, George Gershwin and Lowell Liebermann as well as arrangements of American music written by or for the duo. They frequently collaborate with Broadway music director Eric Stern, who's known for his arrangements of music for Broadway. Broadway arrangements for Opus Two include Stephen Sondheim's A Little Night Music: Suite for Violin and Piano, Suite from George Gershwin's Girl Crazy and Four Moments from Leonard Bernstein's Candide. Their performances and recordings have featured guest performances by noted musicians such as Broadway sopranos Ashley Brown and Marin Mazzie, cellist Andrés Díaz and the Ying Quartet.

Terwilliger and Cooperstock have been performing together since 1993, when they won the United States Information Agency’s Artistic Ambassador Auditions, which resulted in a 30-concert tour of Latin America and the Caribbean where they presented music by American composers. Since then, Opus Two has performed throughout the United States at venues that have included Carnegie Hall and Lincoln Center. Internationally they have performed throughout South America, Europe, Africa, Australia, and Asia with engagements across China, Korea, Japan, and the Russian Far East. In 2011, Opus Two were guests of the U.S. Department of State in residence at the University of Ghana and the National Symphony Orchestra Ghana. In 2013 Opus Two performed throughout Peru as guests of the United States Embassy. The Department of State has also sponsored the Duo in tours of France, Switzerland, Germany, Ukraine and Australia.

Arrangements commissioned and premiered by Opus Two include:

- George Gershwin: Girl Crazy Suite (1930/2012) (arr. Eric Stern)
- George Gershwin: Love Walked In (1938/2012) (arr. Eric Stern)
- George Gershwin: Nice Work if You Can Get It (1937/2012) (arr. Eric Stern)
- Leonard Bernstein: Peter Pan: My House (arr. Eric Stern, soprano, violin & piano)
- Leonard Bernstein: Two House Songs arr. Eric Stern
- Leonard Bernstein: 1600 Pennsylvania Avenue: Take Care of this House (arr. Eric Stern, soprano, violin & piano)
- Leonard Bernstein: Four Moments from Candide (arr. Eric Stern, violin & piano)
- Leonard Bernstein: Clarinet Sonata (arr. William Terwilliger)
- Stephen Sondheim's A Little Night Music: Suite for Violin and Piano (arr. Eric Stern)

== Teaching careers ==
Andrew Cooperstock is a professor of Piano at the University of Colorado, Boulder College of Music. He holds degrees from The Juilliard School, the Cincinnati Conservatory of Music, and the Peabody Conservatory. He is a Steinway artist. He has served as Program Director of the Saarburg (Germany) International Music Festival and School.

William Terwilliger is a professor of Violin at the University of South Carolina School of Music. He earned his doctoral degree from the Eastman School of Music.

Cooperstock and Terwilliger have given master classes at leading music conservatories and schools including The Juilliard School, the Cincinnati Conservatory of Music, and the Butler School of Music at the University of Texas at Austin, and in France, England, Germany, Sweden, Latvia, Ukraine, China, Korea, Taiwan, Hong Kong, Japan, Russia, Peru, Bolivia and Ghana, among others. They have served as Artist Faculty members at summer festivals including Brevard Music Center (NC), Round Top Festival Institute (TX), and Rocky Ridge.

== Recordings ==
- Sondheim: A Little Night Music (Suite for Violin and Piano, Arr. Eric Stern) (Bridge Records, 2023)
- Gershwin: Music for Violin and Piano, with guest artist Ashley Brown, Soprano (Azica Records, 2014)
- Bernstein: Violin Sonata; Piano Trio; New Transcriptions with guest artists Marin Mazzie and Charles Bernard (Naxos, 8.559643, 2010)
- Souvenirs: Music of Paul Schoenfield with guest artist Andrés Díaz (Azica Records, ACD-71241, 2007)
- Chamber Music of Lowell Liebermann with guest artists Andrés Díaz, Erika Eckert, and Ying Quartet (Albany Records, TROY684 2004)
- Aaron Copland: The Complete Works for Violin and Piano (Azica Records, ACD-71205, 2000)
- Robert Starer: Chamber Works (Albany Records, TROY152, 1995)
- Cooperstock's solo recordings include the first recording of Bernstein's complete piano works, Leonard Bernstein Complete Solo Works for Piano, Andrew Cooperstock, Piano Cooperstock's recordings of Bernstein's Bridal Suite and Aaron Copland: El Salón México arrangement for Piano Solo are included in Bernstein - Complete Works, (Deutsche Grammophon-482 9228)
