= Alexander Frey =

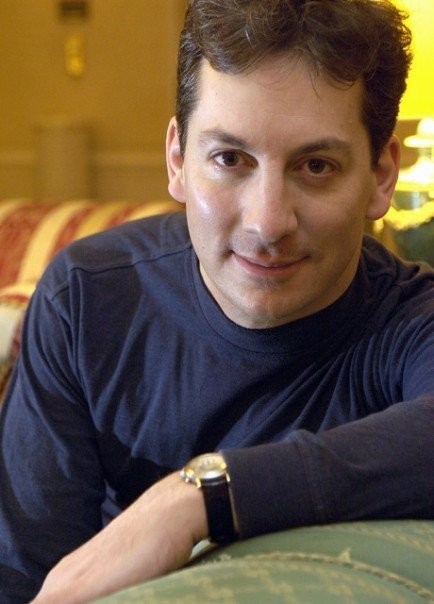

Background information
- Born: Chicago, Illinois, United States
- Occupations: Conductor, pianist, organist, harpsichordist, composer, recording artist.
- Labels: Deutsche Grammophon, Decca, Sony, RCA Red Seal, Koch International Classics, eOne Music, Bach Guild

Alexander Frey, KM, KStJ, Cav.GdP, is an American symphony orchestra conductor, virtuoso organist, pianist, harpsichordist and composer. Frey is in great demand as one of the world's most versatile conductors, and enjoys success in the concert hall and opera house, and in the music of Hollywood and Broadway. Leonard Bernstein referred to him as "a wonderful spirit".

== Education ==
Frey studied piano for many years in Chicago as a protégé of the pianist, harpsichordist and teacher Gavin Williamson (1898–1989), one of the last direct links to 19th-century pianism, and who was a pupil of Artur Schnabel, Wanda Landowska, and Ethel Leginska. His organ teachers in the Chicago area were Richard Webster and Edward Mondello. He received the Bachelor of Music and Master of Music degrees (both with honors) from the University of Michigan School of Music, Theatre & Dance where he studied organ with Robert Glasgow, conducting with Gustav Meier and composition with William Albright and William Bolcom. Further conducting studies were with Leonard Bernstein and John Mauceri.

== Career ==
In addition to his regular appearances as a conductor on major concert series, Frey is very frequently called upon to replace conductors who have canceled their engagements, often at the last minute, and is known for being able to completely learn entire concert programs virtually overnight and follow with performances of great depth.

In January 2008, during an interview broadcast on Radio Cairo while conducting in Egypt, Frey stated that "Music is a peaceful island in a river of sadness."

Frey has been described as "a witty, urbane figure whose wide-ranging genius is evident in the immense breadth of his accomplishments and activities in so many musical genres, and in his performances onstage and in conversation offstage". The Pulitzer Prize-winning author and historian Studs Terkel referred to him as "a Renaissance Man". In a later interview in The Guardian celebrating his 95th birthday, Terkel discussed his own "diverse and idiosyncratic taste in music, from Bob Dylan to Alexander Frey, Louis Armstrong to Woodie Guthrie". Frey has also been called "a raconteur, a young Oscar Levant" by American writer and Prairie Home Companion host Garrison Keillor, "his generation's Noël Coward", "everybody's favourite dinner guest", and that "he seems like a classic character from the golden age of the Broadway musical".

He often plays his solo piano recitals with a lamp next to or on the instrument providing the only stage light (and often the only lighting in the concert hall as well), and an oriental rug underneath the instrument to "create an intimacy between my audience and the music, as if everyone were in my living room listening together".

A resident of Berlin, Germany, Frey has been frequently invited by the city's diplomatic community to perform for heads of state including President Bill Clinton and the Dalai Lama, and former German chancellors Helmut Kohl and Gerhard Schroeder, among others. He is a prominent member of Berlin's intellectual and artistic communities.

He is Artist-in-Residence of the Gaulitana Festival, a major month-long international music festival held on the island of Gozo in Malta.

Frey is also an Honorary Citizen (Cittadino Onorario) of the city of Bari, Italy. He received this honor in a ceremony immediately following a performance he conducted with the Orchestra Sinfonica della Provincia di Bari in 2009.

In 2022, Frey received three knighthoods: Knight of Malta (KM, SMOM), Knight of the Order of Saint John (KStJ), and Knight of the Guardians of Peace (Cavaliere dei Guardiani di Pace), Italy.

He is an official Steinway Artist.

Frey is of Greek and German (Alsatian) descent with family currently residing in Greece, Mulhouse and Paris.

=== Conducting ===
Frey was Principal Conductor of the Rome Philharmonic Orchestra from 1996 to 2004, and during that time was the only American music director of an Italian symphony orchestra. He was appointed conductor of the Bohemia Symphony Orchestra (later named the Stern Chamber Orchestra) in Prague from 2000 to 2006. In 2022, he was appointed Music Director of Orquesta Cum Jubilo del Camp de Tarragona in Spain.

Frey's many guest conducting appearances have encompassed performances with over 50 orchestras, opera houses, and festivals on 5 continents, including the Rio de Janeiro Philharmonic, Seoul Philharmonic Orchestra, Athens State Symphony Orchestra (Greece), Orchestra dell'Arena di Verona, Gulbenkian Orchestra, Rome Philharmonic Orchestra, Seoul Royal Symphony Orchestra, Cairo Symphony Orchestra, Orquesta Sinfónica del Estado de México (State of Mexico Symphony Orchestra), Orchestra Sinfonica Metropolitana di Bari, Athens State Symphony Orchestra, Thessaloniki State Symphony Orchestra, I Musici del Teatro alla Scala, Orchestra Filarmonica della Calabria, Orchestra Sinfonica Siciliana, Varna Philharmonic Orchestra, Collegium Symphonium Veneto (Padua), and the Sibelius Symphony Orchestra among others. He also conducted Ensemble Europa (members of the Israel Philharmonic and Deutsche Oper orchestras) in sold-out concerts in Jerusalem, Tel Aviv, Haifa and Berlin commemorating the 50th anniversary of World War II and the liberation of the concentration camps. In 2006, he conducted Prague's official orchestral gala concert (with the Stern Chamber Orchestra) celebrating Mozart's 250th birthday on the anniversary day of the composer's birth. In 2010, he was the only American conductor invited to conduct an Italian orchestra for the Festa della Repubblica, the Italian independence day on which all the major orchestras in Italy give concerts in honor of the occasion.

Frey has also been Music Director for major productions at the Edinburgh International Festival (where he was awarded the festival's Critics' Prize), the Wiener Festwochen (Theater an der Wien, Vienna), Venice Festival (Teatro La Fenice), Holland Festival, the Fifth European Festival, the Copenhagen Opera Festival, Karlin Theater (Prague), Varna State Opera, Opera Română Craiova and the International Festival Elena Teodorini.

From 1992 to 1996, he was Music Director of the Berliner Ensemble, founded by Bertolt Brecht, where he collaborated with the stage director Peter Zadek. Frey was the first American to hold a position at the Berliner Ensemble, as well as being the theater's first non-German Music Director; his historic predecessors who held the same music directorship included the composers Kurt Weill, Hanns Eisler, and Paul Dessau. While there, Zadek and Frey adapted Vittorio De Sica's film Miracle in Milan (Miracolo e Milano) for the stage using the actual entire dialogue script from the film. Frey devised the idea of restoring the entire original film score and performing it live throughout the play using exactly the same music cues as in the film, marking the first time this technique was ever used. He repeated this method for a subsequent production in Austria of a stage version of the film Arsenic and Old Lace. For Miracle in Milan, Frey and the production were nominated for a Berlin Theater Critics' Prize. In addition to directing the music for 7 other large productions at Berliner Ensemble, Frey also produced and directed the Berliner Ensemble's A Paul Dessau Evening, a multimedia retrospective of the musical and dramatic works of the theater's music director of the 1950s.

=== Piano/organ performances ===
As pianist and organist, Frey has performed with over 30 symphony orchestras including the Berlin Philharmonic, San Francisco Symphony, Leipzig Gewandhaus Orchestra, Vienna Radio Symphony Orchestra (ORF), Munich Symphony Orchestra, Orchestra dell'Arena di Verona, Staatskapelle Berlin, Hollywood Bowl Orchestra, Rome Philharmonic Orchestra, Deutsches Symphonie-Orchester, Cairo Symphony Orchestra, Berliner Symphoniker (Berlin Symphony Orchestra), the orchestra of the Teatro Regio di Torino (with whom he appeared as soloist in the 3 inaugural concerts opening Torino's newly restored opera house), Orquesta Sinfónica del Estado de México (State of Mexico Symphony Orchestra), Bohemian Symphony Orchestra Prague, Rundfunk-Sinfonieorchester Berlin (Berlin Radio Symphony Orchestra), the chamber orchestra of the Palacio de Bellas Artes (the chamber orchestra of the opera house of Mexico City), Orchestra Filarmonica Italiana, Monterrey (Mexico) Symphony Orchestra (UANL), Orchestra Sinfonica Siciliana and Berliner Bach Akademie among others, under such conductors as Claudio Abbado, John Mauceri, Michael Tilson Thomas and Howard Shore.

He frequently played recitals with Jerry Hadley. Frey has performed chamber music with violinist Ruggiero Ricci and the Vermeer Quartet, among others. Ricci and Frey performed New York City's official concert commemorating the tricentennial anniversary of the birth of Johann Sebastian Bach, given in Alice Tully Hall on the 300th anniversary of the composer's birth. He has performed duo concerts in Europe with American writer and A Prairie Home Companion host Garrison Keillor. In 2001, Frey gave live performances for the BBC (with the soprano Marta Eggerth) when the two artists gave recitals together in the U.S. and Europe which included performances in London's Wigmore Hall and in New York at Lincoln Center's Alice Tully Hall. He also performed an all-Verdi program for RAI in Italy.

Frey was the first organist to perform an entire symphony of Gustav Mahler as a solo work for organ. Frey's live performance of the organ transcription of Mahler's Symphony #5 (transcribed by Jerry Kinsella) was cited as one of seven performances listed as "the most important organ-related events of the 20th century" by The American Organist magazine.

Frey was the first pianist to perform the complete piano works of Leonard Bernstein in public, and he has given the world premieres of Bernstein's Five Anniversaries, Thirteen Anniversaries and Valse Gaea. He has performed the cycle throughout Europe, Asia and the United States.

In 2012, Frey performed 4 sold-out organ recitals in one weekend at the National Gallery of Art in Washington, DC. The concerts consisted of French music as part of the celebration of the re-opening of the museum's newly renovated French galleries.

In Barrie Gavin's documentary film, Erich Wolfgang Korngold-Adventures of Wunderkind: A Portrait and Concert, Frey performs several solo keyboard works and the first public hearing of Korngold's second symphony, which exists only in a manuscript piano score. Most of the background piano music in the film is also taken from Frey's performances of the composer's music.

=== Recording awards ===
Frey is a Billboard Classical Music Chart top 10 artist as both conductor and pianist. He has received the Preis der Deutschen Schallplattenkritik (formerly known as the Deutscher Schallplattenpreis), ECHO Klassik Prize, Grand Prix du Disque, Edison Klassiek, Diapason d'Or, and the Diapason d'Or de l'Année, Cannes Classique Award, Grand Prix Award of the Golden Prague International Television Festival, Choice of the French Media Critics, Best Recording of the Year (Fi Magazine), Best Original Cast Recording of the Year-2005 (Borders Music), Favorite Record of the Year-2005 (ArkivMusic), the Bronze World Medal of the New York Festival, BBC Critics Choice, Record of the Month (MusicWeb, UK), Best Instrumental CD of the Month (Galaxie Magazine, Canada), Best CD of the Month (Best New Classics) and the Ö1 Pasticcio Prize (Austria). His recording of Korngold's Between Two Worlds for piano and orchestra (on the Decca label) was listed by Gramophone Magazine as one of the 250 Greatest Recordings of All Time.

June 2005 marked the release of a new CD of Frey conducting the world premiere recording of Leonard Bernstein's Peter Pan, which Frey restored from the composer's manuscripts, including almost an hour of music previously unheard. This recording features Linda Eder in the role of Wendy and Daniel Narducci singing the role of Captain Hook. The CD reached #8 on the Billboard Classical Music Chart, becoming the third highest selling musical theater recording during the weeks following its release, making Frey a Billboard top 10 artist as both conductor and pianist. It also became the best selling recording of Koch International Classics (now called Entertainment One), the record company which produced it. Frey's CD of the complete solo piano music of Leonard Bernstein (also on Koch International Classics) is considered to be the definitive performance of that music. His ongoing project is recording the complete piano works of Erich Wolfgang Korngold (Koch International Classics). Frey's recordings are on the Koch International Classics (Entertainment One), Decca, Deutsche Grammophon, Sony, RCA Red Seal and Bach Guild labels.

=== Contemporary music and the music of Hollywood ===
Frey has maintained a strong commitment to both contemporary music and the film music of Hollywood which has been evident in the many world and regional premieres he is given. At the 2009 "Hollywood in Vienna Festival" held in Vienna, Austria, Frey gave the first public live performance of John Williams' music to Jean-Jacques Annaud's film Seven Years in Tibet when he played a piano transcription of the complete score to that movie. He also performed the world premieres of Max Steiner's Wiener Lob and a large-scale piano transcription of David Arnold's music for the film Independence Day in concert with Arnold in attendance. In Mexico, Frey conducted the Latin American premiere performances of both Bernard Herrmann's music for Alfred Hitchcock's film Vertigo and Franz Waxman's music for the 1941 film Dr. Jekyll and Mr. Hyde. He also gave the first public performance of Erich Wolfgang Korngold's music for the 1944 film Between Two Worlds, as well as the European premiere of the Suite from Schindler's List, composed and arranged by John Williams. In Barrie Gavin's documentary film, Erich Wolfgang Korngold-Adventures of Wunderkind: A Portrait and Concert, Frey performs the first public hearing of Korngold's second symphony, composed in Hollywood at the end of the composers life and exists only in piano score, in addition to playing several solo keyboard works and most of the background piano music. The film won the Preis der Deutschen Schallplattenkritik in the first year of the DVD category of the award. This highly acclaimed documentary documentary and its performers also received the Edison Klassiek Prize and many other awards.

He has conducted James Helme Sutcliffe's Gymnopedie and Night Music (both world premieres), Charles Kalman's Hudson Concerto, Naji Hakim's Hymne de l'Univers (North American premiere) and Ada Gentile's Adagio and Adagio Prima, Adagio Seconda. As pianist, Frey has given the world premieres of Leonard Bernstein's Five Anniversaries and Thirteen Anniversaries, and Valse Gaea as well as the European and Asian premieres of Bernstein's Touches and Sonata for the Piano. He gave the world premieres of Erich Wolfgang Korngold's Vier Walzer (Four Waltzes), Kurt Weill's Albumblatt (the composer's only work for solo piano) and Franz Schubert's then-unpublished Fugue in D minor for organ.

Frey was Musical Advisor to the Hollywood in Vienna Festival from 2007 to 2013.

== Radio biography ==
In 1997, an hour-long radio program about Frey's life and work, hosted by Studs Terkel, was broadcast on The Studs Terkel Program, that featured interviews with a wide variety of guests and that aired 98.7 WFMT Chicago each weekday from 1952 to 1997.
