= Hershy Kay =

American composer, arranger, and orchestrator

Hershy Kay (November 17, 1919 – December 2, 1981) was an American composer, arranger, and orchestrator. He is most noteworthy for the orchestrations of several Broadway shows, and for the ballets he arranged for George Balanchine's New York City Ballet.

== Biography ==
The son of a Philadelphia printer, Kay became a student at Philadelphia's Curtis Institute (1936–1940) where he studied cello and composition under Randall Thompson, in whose classes he was a classmate of Leonard Bernstein. In New York he played in various pit orchestras and started arranging music to escape playing the cello. Self-taught as an orchestrator, for his first professional project Kay orchestrated several songs for Brazilian soprano Elsie Houston's show at the Rainbow Room in 1940.

When Leonard Bernstein commissioned Kay to orchestrate his musical comedy On the Town in 1944, Kay became one of the most sought after orchestrators on Broadway. Later collaborations with Bernstein include Peter Pan (1950) and Candide (1956). Kay also did orchestrations for Marc Blitzstein (Juno), Harvey Schmidt (110 in the Shade), Cy Coleman (Barnum) and Andrew Lloyd Webber (Evita). In 1954, George Balanchine commissioned Kay to compose the score for his ballet Western Symphony, set in the American West. Kay later wrote the score for Balanchine's Stars and Stripes, based on John Philip Sousa's music.

A composer in his own right, Hershy Kay's reconstruction and orchestration of Louis Moreau Gottschalk's Grande Tarantelle, Op. 67, for piano and orchestra July 24, 1957, later choreographed by Balanchine as Tarantella, led to a renewed interest in Gottschalk's music. He also composed music for an LP, Mother Goose, with the actors Boris Karloff, Cyril Ritchard and Celeste Holm; this was first released on Caedmon in 1958. In 1961, Kay conducted Eddie Sauter's Jazz compositions for Stan Getz's Focus record. He also re-orchestrated Sigmund Romberg's music in a 1963 Columbia Masterworks recording of selections from the 1924 operetta The Student Prince, starring Roberta Peters, Jan Peerce, and Giorgio Tozzi.

Kay died on December 2, 1981, in Danbury, Connecticut.

== Partial works list ==
- Cakewalk (arrangements to music by Gottschalk for the New York City Ballet)
- Grande Tarantelle, Op. 67, for piano and orchestra (reconstruction and arrangement to music by Gottschalk for NYCB)
- Western Symphony (arrangements of traditional American melodies for NYCB)
- Union Jack (arrangements of traditional British melodies for NYCB)
- Stars and Stripes (arrangements of John Philip Sousa for NYCB)
- Who Cares? (for NYCB)
- The Concert (for NYCB)
- On the Town (original 1944 orchestrations, co-orchestrator with composer Leonard Bernstein)
- Peter Pan
- Candide (original 1956 orchestrations, co-orchestrator with composer Leonard Bernstein); and 1971 revival orchestrations without Bernstein
- Once Upon a Mattress
- A Chorus Line
- 1600 Pennsylvania Avenue (musical) (with Sid Ramin)
- Barnum
- Evita
- Focus (with Stan Getz and Eddie Sauter)
- Foxy
- Milk and Honey (with Eddie Sauter)
- A Flag is Born
- The Golden Apple
- Reuben, Reuben
- Drat! The Cat!
- Bernstein's Mass
- On the Twentieth Century
- 110 in the Shade
- Two movements orchestrated ("L'escarpolette" and "Le Volant") from Jeux D'Enfants Suite by Georges Bizet
- Bernstein's Olympic Hymn (1981)
