= First Anniversary =

First Anniversary may refer to:

- "First Anniversary" (The Outer Limits), a television episode
- 1st Anniversary, a 2003 album by Melon Kinenbi
- The First Anniversary: An Anatomy of the World, a 1611 poem by John Donne

== See also ==
- Anniversary (disambiguation)
- Wedding anniversary
