= Anniversary (disambiguation) =

An anniversary is a day that commemorates and/or celebrates an event that occurred on the same day of the year, of the initial event.

Anniversary may also refer to:

== Music ==
- Anniversary!, a 1989 Stan Getz album
- Anniversary (Akina Nakamori album), 1984
- Anniversary (Split Enz album), 1994
- Anniversary (Ed Roland album), unreleased album recorded in 2014
- Anniversary (Bryson Tiller album), 2020
- "Anniversary" (Tony! Toni! Toné! song), 1993
- "Anniversary" (Sid song), 2013
- "Anniversary" (E-girls song), 2015
- Anniversary, a compilation album by Pentangle, 1992

== Other uses ==
- "Anniversary" (short story), a 1959 short story by Isaac Asimov
- Anniversary (1936 film), a Hungarian comedy film
- Anniversary (1963 film), a Canadian documentary
- Anniversary (2015 film), a Hong Kong film
- Anniversary (2025 film), an American thriller
- Anniversary Peak, a mountain in Canada
- Tomb Raider: Anniversary, a 2007 remake of the original 1996 Tomb Raider game
- The Anniversary edition of Gregg shorthand
- "Anniversary" (The Good Life), a television episode
- "Anniversary" (Space Ghost Coast to Coast), a television episode
- Anniversaries (John Donne Poems), elegies by John Donne
- Anniversaries (Bernstein), series of short compositions by Leonard Bernstein

== See also ==
- The Anniversary (disambiguation)
