= Peggy Stuart Coolidge =

American classical composer

- Born: 19 July 1913; Swampscott, Massachusetts, US
- Died: May 7, 1981 (aged 67); Cushing, Maine, US
- Education: New England Conservatory
- Occupations: conductor composer

Peggy Stuart Coolidge (19 July 1913 – 7 May 1981) was an American composer and conductor. She was one of the first female American composers to have a recording devoted to her symphonic works, and the first American composer (male or female) to have a concert devoted entirely to her works presented in the Soviet Union. Although she does not quote particular melodies, her compositional style is accessible and influenced by American folk and popular idioms; her success at creating a distinctly American musical voice places her among such figures as Charles Ives, Aaron Copland and George Gershwin.

Peggy Stuart was born in Swampscott, Massachusetts. She started piano lessons at age five, wrote her first song at age nine, and later studied with Heinrich Gebhard (a pupil of Teodor Leszetycki and teacher of Leonard Bernstein), privately with Raymond Robinson, and at the New England Conservatory with Quincy Porter. She originally planned to be a concert pianist, and her early mature works are all for piano.

In 1937, she wrote a ballet Cracked Ice, for the Boston Skating Club. This was the first ballet ever composed specifically for ice skating. The work was scored, at her request, by Ferde Grofé, who conducted it at Madison Square Garden; it was also played by the Boston Pops Orchestra under Arthur Fiedler. Stuart then studied orchestration. Her orchestral scores Night Froth, The Island (sinfonietta), Smoke Drift and Twilight City (piano and orchestra) were all premiered by the Boston Pops.

During World War II, she was involved in a housing bureau for servicemen stationed in Boston, and often played for hospitalised soldiers. She conducted an all-woman ensemble, and was pianist and assistant conductor of the Women's Symphony of Boston. She founded the Junior League Orchestra in Boston and conducted it for seven years. After the war she moved to New York City, and started a research project in music psychotherapy at a mental institution.

In 1952 she married Joseph R. Coolidge, a freelance writer from Boston who was a descendant of Thomas Jefferson and a decorated Army captain and OSS operative who'd been wounded in French Indochina soon after World War II. Together they wrote a number of children's stories with Peggy's background music, and other songs in traditional folk style. She wrote her only film score for The Silken Affair, starring David Niven, in 1956. She wrote incidental music for a New York production of Seán O'Casey's Red Roses for Me, and the music was later reworked as the orchestral suite Dublin Town. In 1963 and 1965, she was invited to Vienna, Budapest, Warsaw and Moscow for performances of her works, also sometimes appearing as piano soloist. She and Joseph met Aram Khachaturian and his wife Nina Makarova, becoming close friends. A ballet An Evening in New Orleans was written on her return to the United States.

Rhapsody for Harp and Orchestra was written in 1965. In 1967 her works were played in Tokyo in a concert of American music, and she was received by Emperor Hirohito's brother, Prince Mikasa. In 1969 Peggy Stuart Coolidge wrote Spirituals in Sunshine and Shadow, an orchestral work inspired by African-American blues and spirituals.

In 1970 she wrote Pioneer Dances, inspired by the 19th century settlers of America. This was the only American work played at a 1975 Carnegie Hall concert to commemorate the 150th anniversary of Norwegian immigration to the United States.

In 1970 also, at Khachaturian's instigation, she became the first American composer to have a concert devoted entirely to her works presented in the Soviet Union. She was awarded the medal of the Soviet Union of Workers in Art on this occasion. Her name started to become better known, and she was featured in concerts in Western Europe and East Berlin.

In 1971, at the request of the World Wildlife Fund, she composed a three-minute theme to complement the fund's visual symbol of a giant panda on a green field. The theme became the basis for a ten-minute orchestral work with narration written by her husband, called Blue Planet. That year also saw New England Autumn, a two-movement suite for chamber orchestra.

In 1975, the Westphalian Symphony Orchestra conducted by Siegfried Landau recorded one of the first LPs ever devoted to the works of a single American female composer. The works were the Rhapsody for Harp and Orchestra (with soloist Aristid von Würtzler), New England Autumn, Pioneer Dances, and Spirituals in Sunshine and Shadow.

She later wrote a song cycle to words by American poets, to honour the art patron Isabella Stewart Gardner, her husband's great-aunt. American Mosaic was written in 1978 on a commission by the American Wind Symphony.

Peggy Stuart Coolidge died of cancer in Cushing, Maine. Her musical scores are held at the Harvard University Library.

Many of her premieres took place in Europe, and she is better known overseas than she is in her own country.

== Works ==
In addition to the works mentioned above, Peggy Stuart Coolidge wrote:

- American Mood, symphonic poem
- American Sketch, piano and orchestra
- Boston Concerto, piano and orchestra
- Come with Us, incidental music
- The Conversation Waltz, orchestra
- Dark Water, violin and piano
- La Enmascarada, chamber ensemble
- Étude, piano
- Evening in New Orleans, ballet
- French Drinks, piano and orchestra
- Improvisation for Vera, harp
- In the Shadow of Spain, piano, strings, flute and timpani
- Isabella, orchestra
- Lament, orchestra
- Look over the Bay, piano
- Look to the Wind, chamber ensemble
- Lullaby in Blue, piano
- Mister Rip, incidental music
- The Moon Passing Behind the Clouds, piano
- Oriental Scarf Dance, orchestra
- Out of the Night, piano and orchestra
- Passing Shadow, violin, piano and flute
- Petit Prelude, harp
- P.M. Preludes, piano
- Song of the Night-Bird, piano
- Spanish Dance, chamber ensemble
- Sunday Afternoon in the Public Garden, piano and orchestra
- The Voice, orchestra
- Voices, incidental music (song)
- many songs and vocal pieces.
