= The Anniversary (disambiguation) =

The Anniversary may refer to:

- The Anniversary, a 1966 British play by Bill MacIlwraith

- The Anniversary (1968 film), a 1968 British film adaptation of the 1966 play, directed by Roy Ward Baker

- "The Anniversary" (Fawlty Towers), a 1979 episode of the British sitcom Fawlty Towers
- The Anniversary, American alternative rock band formed in 1997
- The Anniversary Party, a 2001 American comedy-drama film, directed by Jennifer Jason Leigh and Alan Cumming
- The Anniversary (2004 film), a 2003 short film directed by Ham Tran
- The Anniversary (2014 film), directed by Canadian Valerie Buhagiar

== See also ==
- Anniversary (disambiguation)
