= A Musical Toast =

Orchestral composition by Leonard Bernstein

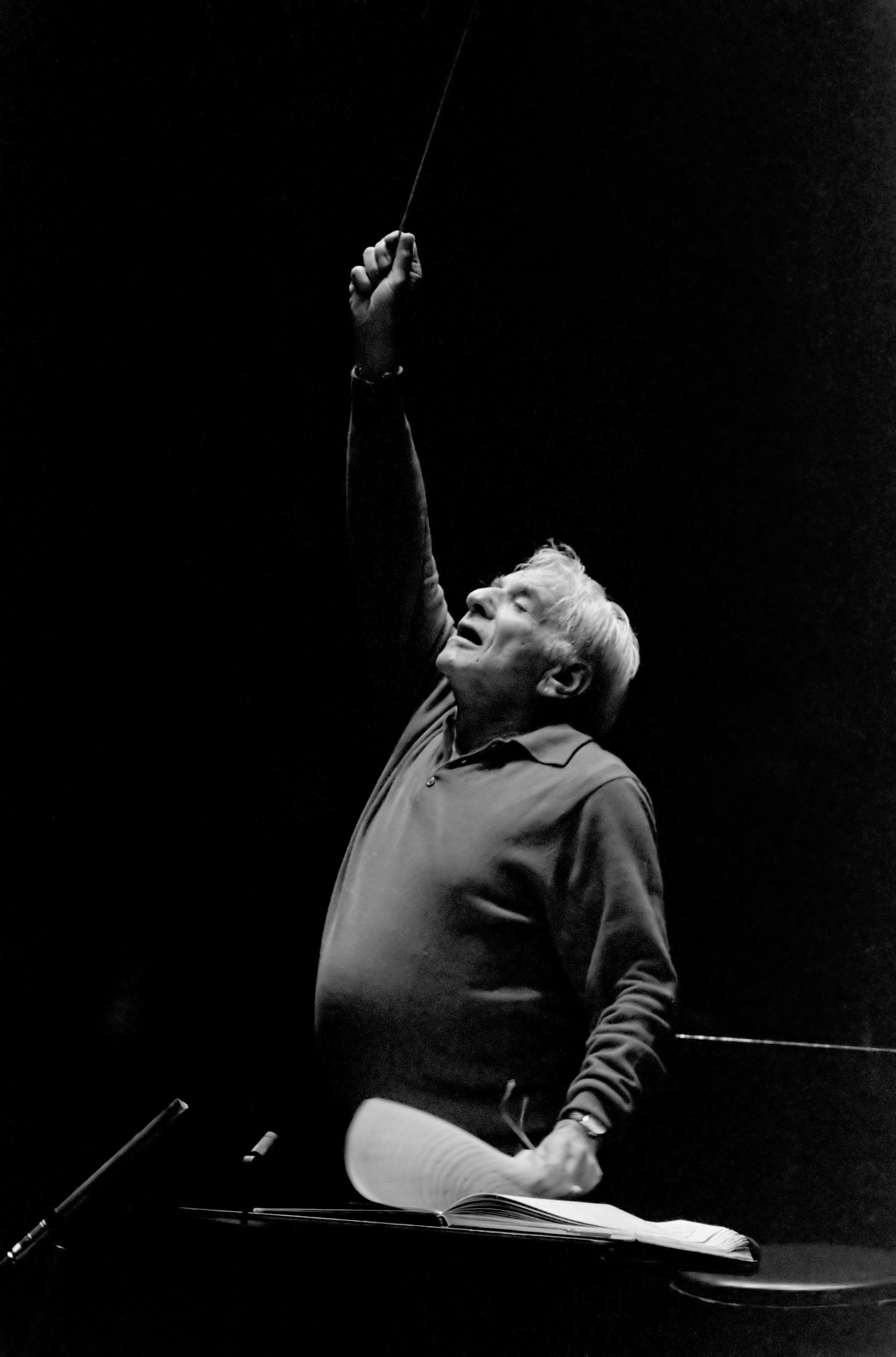
Leonard Bernstein in 1987

A Musical Toast is a short orchestral composition by the composer, educator, and conductor Leonard Bernstein written for the memorial concert of Bernstein's colleague, André Kostelanetz. It premiered in October 11, 1980, at the Avery Fisher Hall of New York City with the New York Philharmonic conducted by Zubin Mehta.

== Composition ==
The structure and musicality of the work resembles Bernstein's previous orchestral work, Slava, by also using male voices (in this case screaming the name of Kostelanetz) and an epic coda that conclude the work fortissimo in a triumphal way. The composition calls for a large orchestra and a male chorus.

Bernstein himself described the work as follows:

After attending the premiere of my sacred service Love Songs for Sabbath, André Kostelanetz commissioned a work from me. It was his hope that this new piece would repeat the success he had had with Lincoln Portrait, the commission he had given Copland. This time, however, instead of continuity being provided by a narrator, the idea was to use the actual voices of famous statesmen, in this case, mostly the voices of FDR and JFK. Articles of Faith, the resulting work, was premiered by the Detroit Symphony led by Sixten Ehrling. It was not well received and Kostelanetz abandoned it."

== Other uses of the work ==
In 1987, PBS hosted with violinist Itzhak Perlman, conductor John Mauceri, and singer and actress Bernadette Peters for a special called A Musical Toast: The Stars Shine on Public Television that takes inspiration from this Bernstein's work and had the composer himself as a special guest, playing and conducting some of his famous songs and music.
