= Irving Berlin's 100th Birthday Celebration =

Television concert special

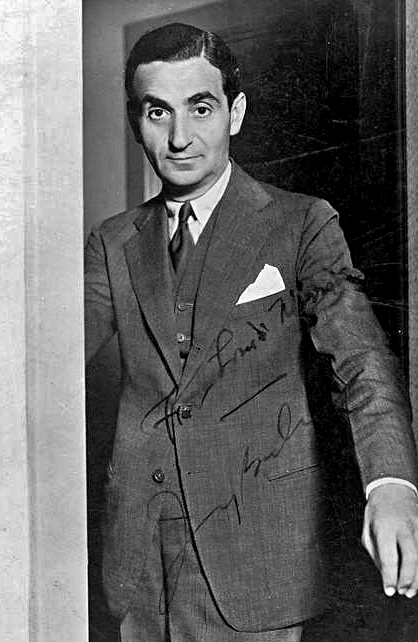
Irving Berlin circa 1920

Irving Berlin's 100th Birthday Celebration was a concert special held in his honor at Carnegie Hall on May 11, 1988. It was aired on CBS television two weeks later, on May 27. At the 40th annual Emmy Awards later that summer, on August 28, it won two Emmys for outstanding variety, music or comedy program. Berlin himself did not attend, as he had retired from public life.

The gala concert was sponsored by Carnegie Hall and the American Society of Composers, Authors and Publishers (ASCAP), of which Berlin was a founding member. A number of countries also observed Berlin's birthday, including Great Britain, and Viking Press subsequently published an unauthorized biography of Berlin by Laurence Bergreen. The show was produced by Don Mischer, who produces the Tony Award telecasts.

== Performances ==
Among the dozens of performers were Frank Sinatra, Isaac Stern, Willie Nelson, Michael Feinstein, Tony Bennett, Ray Charles, Rosemary Clooney, Billy Eckstine, Marilyn Horne, Jerome Robbins, Tommy Tune, and fellow composer Morton Gould, president of ASCAP. Proceeds from the benefit went to ASCAP and Carnegie Hall.

Leonard Bernstein performed "My Twelve Tone Melody", a song he wrote in tribute to Berlin.

The hosts included Shirley MacLaine, Walter Cronkite, Jerome Robbins, and Morton Gould, with the following list including most of the artists and songs performed during the 90 + minute TV special:

- Shirley MacLaine: "Let Me Sing & I'm Happy"
- Nell Carter and Michael Feinstein: "Everybody Step", "I Love A Piano", "Alexander's Ragtime Band"
- Jerry Orbach and Maureen McGovern: "Play A Simple Melody", "A Pretty Girl Is Like A Melody", "The Song Is Ended", 'Easter Parade'
- Willie Nelson: "Blue Skies"
- Madeline Kahn: "You'd Be Surprised"
- Ray Charles: "How Deep Is The Ocean?", "What'll I Do?"
- Joe Williams, Billy Eckstine and Diane Schuur: "Steppin' Out with My Baby", "Marie", "Cheek To Cheek", "Say It With Music"
- Bea Arthur, Barry Bostwick and Maryann Plunkett: "It's a Lovely Day Today", "The Hostess With the Mostess", and a medley of songs from the film, Annie Get Your Gun
- Rosemary Clooney: "Count Your Blessings", "White Christmas"
- Tony Bennett: "Shaking the Blues Away"
- Tommy Tune: "Puttin' On the Ritz"
- Garrison Keillor: recites "All Alone"
- Natalie Cole: "Supper Time"
- Frank Sinatra: "Always", "When I Lost You"
- The U.S. Army Chorus with the Boys and Girl Scouts: "This Is The Army", "This Is A Great Country"
- Marilyn Horne: "God Bless America"
- Finale: Entire cast performing "There's No Business Like Show Business"

== See also ==
- List of songs written by Irving Berlin
