= Non troppo presto (Bernstein) =

Composition by Leonard Bernstein

- (Music for the Dance No. 1)
- by Leonard Bernstein
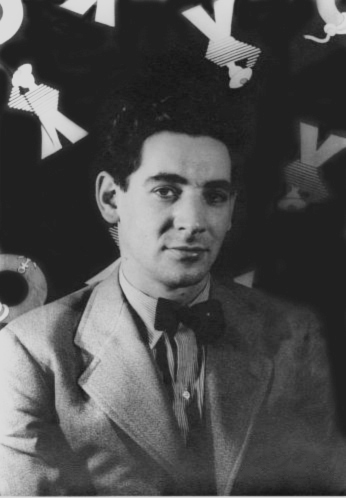
- Bernstein in 1944
- Composed: June 12, 1937
- Performed: June 12, 1938 - Brookline, Massachusetts
- Published: 2010 - New York
- Publisher: Amberson Holdings; Leonard Bernstein Music Publishing Company; Boosey & Hawkes
- Duration: 2 to 3 minutes
- Movements: 1
- Scoring: Solo piano

Non troppo presto, (Note: Even though, according to Italian capitalization rules, only the first letter of the title should be capitalized, some publishers have opted for capitalizing the first letter in each word, which is correct according to English capitalization rules.) sometimes alternatively entitled Music for the Dance No. 1, (Note: Some editions and recordings also use alternative spellings, such as Music for the Dance, No. I and Music for the Dance No. I.) refers to an untitled composition for piano by American composer Leonard Bernstein, written in 1937.

== Background ==
Non troppo presto is an untitled composition written by Bernstein to Mildred Spiegel Zucker, a music teacher which was a childhood friend of Bernstein. It was presumably written for his birthday, perhaps as a birthday present. The piece was completed on June 12, 1937, and the first known performance took place exactly one year later, on June 12, 1938, at the studio of Heinrich Gebhard, in Brookline, Massachusetts.

Since Bernstein also wrote another composition for piano on the occasion of Mildred's birthday one year later which was entitled Music for the Dance No. 2, this has led publishers to believe that this composition could be the Music for the Dance No. 1. However, this has not been confirmed by Bernstein's correspondence with the dedicatee.

After completion and possible subsequent revision, the manuscript was abandoned and rediscovered many years after the composer's death in the Leonard Bernstein Archive at the Library of Congress. Though it was initially edited in 1937, it was published in 2010 by Amberson Holdings, the Leonard Bernstein Music Publishing Company and Boosey & Hawkes.

== Structure ==
Since the manuscript of this piece was found untitled in the archive, Non troppo presto takes its title from the tempo marking at the beginning. It is in one movement and a steady common time, although the last measure in the first ending of the repetition is in 9/8 (4/8+2/8+3/8) and bars 23 and 32 are in 3/4. It has a total of 45 bars (or 54 with repetitions) and a duration of two to three minutes. Leonard Bernstein wrote two inscriptions in the manuscript: "for Mildred, 21" at the top and "with all my heart—L.B." at the end.

Non troppo presto has a rhythmically marked character where two-part textures largely predominate. The harmonies presented in the piece are generally harsher and more brittle than in other later works, and the diatonic lyricism that he would later develop in some of his most popular works is mostly missing.

== Recordings ==
Given the fact that Non troppo presto was published relatively recently, recordings are not very well known and are typically released within cycles of complete music for piano by Bernstein. Here is a list of recordings of this composition:

- Alexander Dossin gave the world premiere recording with Naxos. The recording was taken some time between January 3 and 5 and March 24 and 26, 2014, at the Beall Concert Hall in the University of Oregon, in Eugene, Oregon. The recording was released in 2015.
- Leann Osterkamp also recorded the piece with Steinway & Sons in a collection of complete solo piano works by Bernstein. The piece was recorded at the Steinway Hall in New York City and was released on compact disc on September 15, 2017.
- Andrew Cooperstock recorded the piece with Bridge Records. The recording was also released on compact disc in 2017, in a compilation of works for piano by the composer.
- Katie Mahan recorded the piece for a Deutsche Grammophon release of Bernstein's full oeuvre. The recording was taken on November 25 and 26, 2017, at the Meistersaal, in Berlin. The recording was released first as a compilation of solo piano works by Bernstein and then as a compilation of all complete works by Bernstein, both in 2018.
- Michele Tozzetti recorded the piece under Piano Classics. The recording was made between December 8 and 10, 2017, at the Musicafelix - Studio Benelli Mosell, in Prato, Italy. It was released on compact disc on May 24, 2019.

== See also ==
- Music for the Dance No. 2
