= Music for the Dance No. 2 =

Composition by Leonard Bernstein

- by Leonard Bernstein
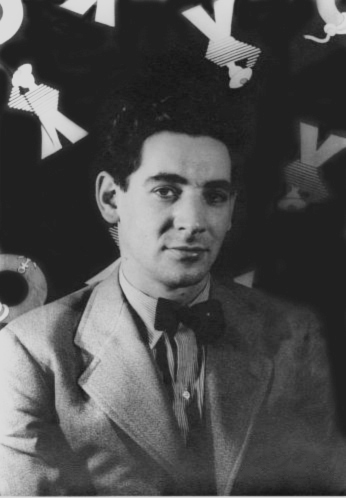
- Bernstein in 1944
- Composed: June 14, 1938
- Performed: June 12, 1938 - Brookline, Massachusetts
- Published: 2010 - New York
- Publisher: Amberson Holdings; Leonard Bernstein Music Publishing Company; Boosey & Hawkes
- Recorded: Alexander Dossin (2014)
- Duration: 4 to 5 minutes
- Movements: 3
- Scoring: Solo piano

Music for the Dance No. 2 (Note: Some editions and recordings also use alternative spellings, such as Music for the Dance, No. II and Music for the Dance No. II.) is a composition for piano by American composer Leonard Bernstein. It was finished in 1938.

== Background ==
Music for the Dance No. 2 is most notable for being one of the first Bernstein pieces to be performed in public by the composer, together with his Non troppo presto. It was finished in 1938. The date of completion is a source of controversy, since it was first performed by Leonard Bernstein at the studio of Heinrich Gebhard, in Brookline, Massachusetts on June 12, 1938. However, the inscription at the end of the original manuscript reads June 14, 1938, which probably means that the composer revised the piece after performing it.

The piece was dedicated to "Mildred on her 22nd birthday in friendliest affection" and was first performed on his birthday. In this case, the name "Mildred" refers to Mildred Spiegel Zucker, a music teacher and childhood friend of Bernstein, with whom Bernstein had a lifelong friendship and shared a fair amount of correspondence.

It was initially edited in 1938 by Amberson Holdings but remained unpublished for many decades. The manuscript was left in the Leonard Bernstein Archive at the Library of Congress until the Leonard Bernstein Music Publishing Company and Boosey & Hawkes released it in 2010.

== Structure ==
This composition is scored for solo piano and has an approximate duration of four to five minutes. It consists of three short untitled movements, the most commonly used title of which is taken from the tempo marking at the beginning of each movement. The movement list is as follows:

	Tempo	Bars	Meter
I	Moderato	36	6/8 (Note: One bar is in 9/8.)
II	Waltz time	42	3/4 (Note: One bar is in 2/4.)
III	Allegro non troppo, with force	55 (Note: 63 bars with repetitions.)	3/4 (6/8) (Note: One bar is in 7/8.)

== Recordings ==
Given the fact that Music for the Dance No. 2 was published relatively recently, recordings are not very well known and are typically released within cycles of complete music for piano by Bernstein. Here is a list of recordings of this composition:

- Alexander Dossin gave the world premiere recording with Naxos. The recording was taken some time between January 3 and 5 and March 24 and 26, 2014, at the Beall Concert Hall in the University of Oregon, in Eugene, Oregon. The recording was released in 2015.
- Leann Osterkamp also recorded the piece with Steinway & Sons in a collection of complete solo piano works by Bernstein. The piece was recorded at the Steinway Hall in New York City and was released on compact disc on September 15, 2017.
- Andrew Cooperstock recorded the piece with Bridge Records. The recording was also released on compact disc in 2017, in a compilation of works for piano by the composer.
- Katie Mahan recorded the piece for a Deutsche Grammophon release of Bernstein's full oeuvre. The recording was taken on November 25 and 26, 2017, at the Meistersaal, in Berlin. The recording was released first as a compilation of solo piano works by Bernstein and then as a compilation of all complete works by Bernstein, both in 2018.
- Michele Tozzetti recorded the piece under Piano Classics. The recording was made between December 8 and 10, 2017, at the Musicafelix - Studio Benelli Mosell, in Prato, Italy. It was released on compact disc on May 24, 2019.

== See also ==
- Non troppo presto (Bernstein)
