= Piano Sonata (Bernstein) =

Composition by Leonard Bernstein

- by Leonard Bernstein
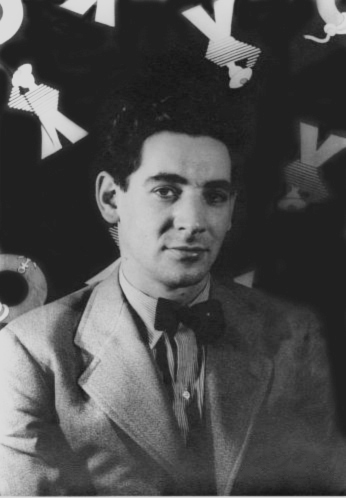
- Bernstein in 1944
- Composed: 1938
- Performed: 1938 - Boston, Massachusetts
- Published: 1979 - New York
- Publisher: Amberson Holdings; Leonard Bernstein Music Publishing Company; Boosey & Hawkes
- Duration: 15 minutes
- Movements: 2
- Scoring: Solo piano

The Piano Sonata, originally entitled Sonata for the Piano, (Note: This is the title used by the composer. It is published under this title, but some catalogs and recordings may use either one interchangeably.) is the only piano sonata by American composer Leonard Bernstein. An early work by the composer, it was finished in 1938.

== Background ==
The Piano Sonata is a juvenilia work composed by Bernstein while he was still a student at Harvard University. The composition process is likely to have started as early as 1936, as Bernstein was able to play it in part at a reception for Dimitri Mitropoulos in January 1937. Mitropoulos is said to have been very impressed by the piece, as he told Bernstein: "You have everything to make you great; it is up to you only to fulfil your mission."

The piece was completed and premiered by Bernstein himself in Boston, Massachusetts, in 1938. It remained unpublished until many decades later, in 1979, when it was published by Amberson Holdings, the Leonard Bernstein Music Publishing Company, and Boosey & Hawkes. Even though the sonata was completed in the late 30s, it was dedicated to fellow student and musician Heinrich Gebhard "in memoriam", as Gebhard died in 1963, long before the composition was published.

== Structure ==
Bernstein's Piano Sonata is divided into two untitled movements with a total approximate duration of 15 minutes. While some sources divide the sonata into three movements, splitting the second movement in bar 53 at the Moderato mark, this division is not present in the score and most recordings do not split the second movement.

The movement list is as follows. Even though the movements are untitled, the titles are taken from the tempo markings at the beginning of each section:

1. Cadenza. Presto
2. Largo — Moderato (— Cadenza)

The first movement is 192 bars and 5 to 6 minutes long. It starts out with a "Presto" cadenza with one melodic line and moves on to a "Molto moderato" subsection in which one of the main themes is presented. A "Rubato" subsection ensues with a melody played in octaves, followed by the previous theme and a repeat "Rubato" subsection some bars later. A double bar line separates this from the second section in the piece: a reprise of the "Presto" cadenza in bar 28. The next bar is also separated by a double bar line, starting a "Scherzando" section in bar 29. This is the lengthiest part in the movement and features many time signature changes, sometimes in every bar. This section continues with recurring themes and subthemes until the end of the movement.

The second movement is 116 bars and 11 to 12 minutes long. Starting out with a "Largo" tempo marking, it presents a mysterious melody also marked "very deep" in the score. This section is in an unchanging 8/8 and features a segment in bars 46 and 47 where the pianist is asked to play a wide range of white notes with their arms. The second section starts in bar 53 after a double bar line, marked "Moderato". Some sources state that this marks the start of the third movement in the sonata. This section captures and reprises some of the motifs used in the first movement, until a cadenza finishes the piece. This cadenza is not divided by a double bar line and has no tempo marking. In fact, Bernstein specifies that it must be played legato, "wandering", without rhythm or phrasing, and that "the time values indicated in this cadenza are only approximate to what is psychologically correct."

== Recordings ==
- Alexander Dossin recorded the piece under Naxos. The recording was taken some time between January 3 and 5 and March 24 and 26, 2014, at the Beall Concert Hall in the University of Oregon, in Eugene, Oregon. It was later released in 2015.
- Leann Osterkamp also recorded the piece with Steinway & Sons in a collection of complete solo piano works by Bernstein. The piece was recorded at the Steinway Hall in New York City and was released on compact disc on September 15, 2017.
- Andrew Cooperstock recorded the piece with Bridge Records. The recording was also released on compact disc in 2017, in a compilation of works for piano by the composer.
- Katie Mahan recorded the piece for a Deutsche Grammophon release of Bernstein's full oeuvre. The recording was taken on November 25 and 26, 2017, at the Meistersaal, in Berlin. The recording was released first as a compilation of solo piano works by Bernstein and then as a compilation of all complete works by Bernstein, both in 2018.
- Michele Tozzetti recorded the piece under Piano Classics. The recording was made between December 8 and 10, 2017, at the Musicafelix - Studio Benelli Mosell, in Prato, Italy. It was released on compact disc on May 24, 2019.
