= My Twelve Tone Melody =

1988 song by Leonard Bernstein in tribute to Irving Berlin

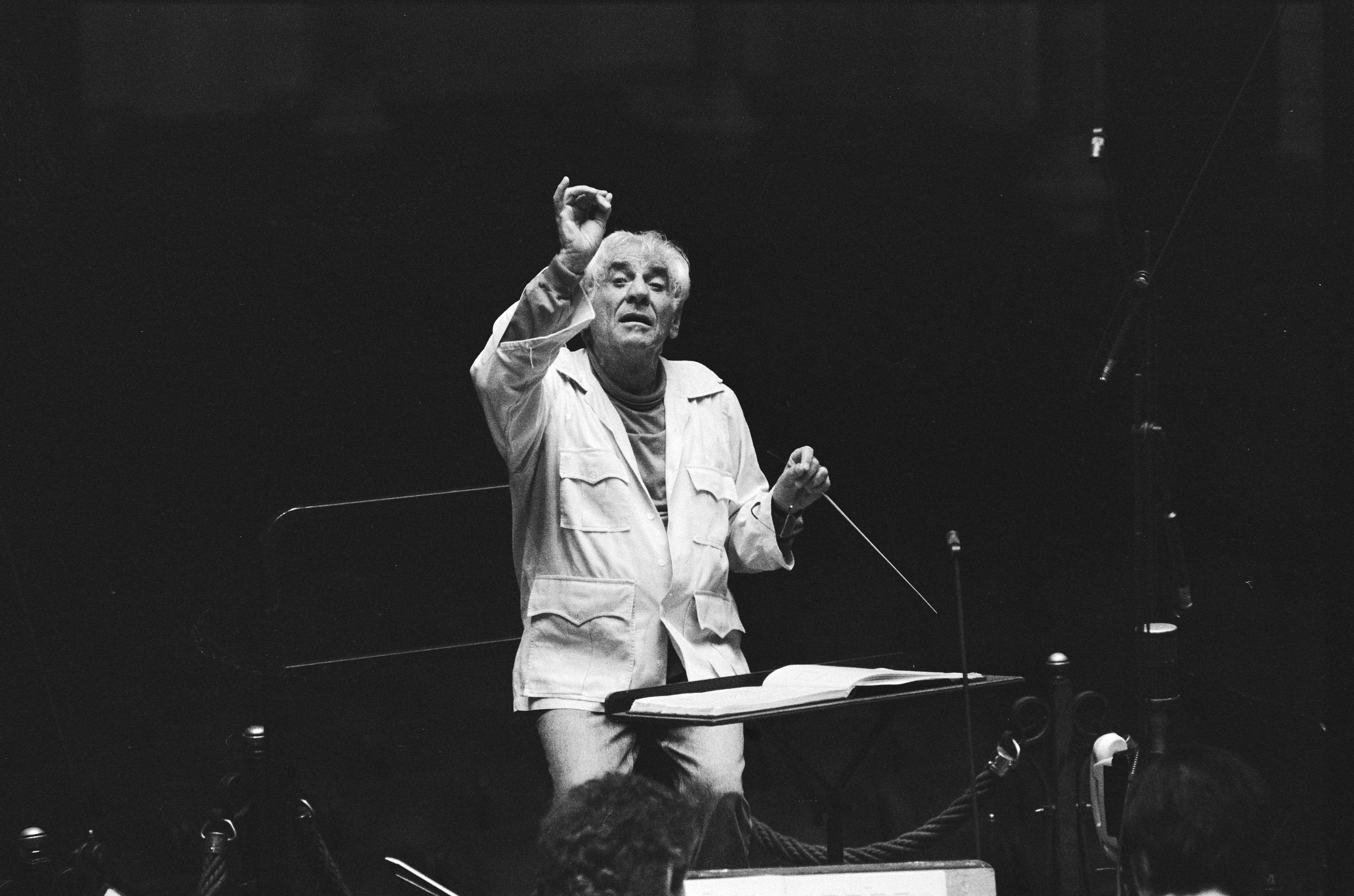
Leonard Bernstein conducting the Concertgebouw Orchestra, 1985

"My Twelve-Tone Melody" is a 1988 composition for voice and piano by Leonard Bernstein written in tribute to Irving Berlin in celebration of Berlin's 100th birthday. It was performed by Bernstein at the concert to celebrate Berlin's birthday at Carnegie Hall on May 11, 1988.

The piece was poorly received by Berlin's family at the concert; Bernstein's biographer, Joan Peyser, described it as a "dour, mean little piece" and that the piece could be interpreted as a "shot fired in a battle" between "late twentieth-century masters". Bernstein was the only performer at the concert not to perform one of Berlin's compositions.

The piece is written in the twelve-tone technique and adapts Berlin's songs "Always" (1925), and "Russian Lullaby" (1927) which Bernstein remembered from his youth. The piece is two minutes in length.

Isabel Leonard performed the song in several all-Bernstein concerts.

An unpublished and unrelated work by Bernstein from the unfinished musical theatre work Alarums and Flourishes (1980), named "12-tone Serenade", is also called "My Twelve Tone Melody".
