= La Bonne Cuisine: Four Recipes for Voice and Piano =

Song cycle by Leonard Bernstein

La Bonne Cuisine
- Four Recipes for Voice and Piano
- Song cycle by Leonard Bernstein
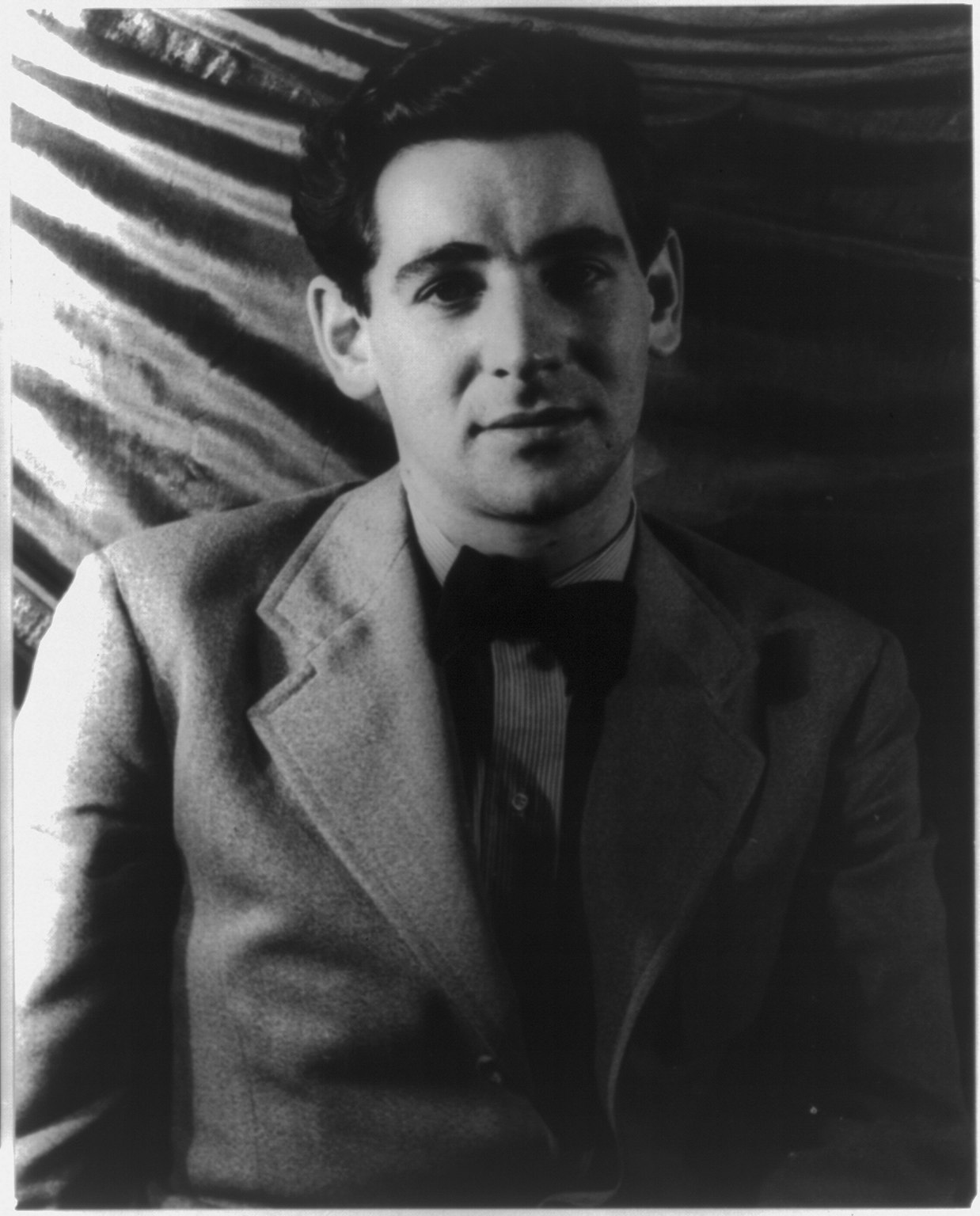
- The composer in 1944
- Text: Recipes from the 1899 French cookery book La Bonne Cuisine Française, translated by Bernstein
- Language: English
- Composed: 1947
- Dedication: Jennie Tourel
- Performed: October 10, 1948 Town Hall in New York City
- Duration: 4 min.
- Movements: 4
- Scoring: voice; piano

La Bonne Cuisine: Four Recipes for Voice and Piano is a 1947 song cycle of recipes by Leonard Bernstein.

== Overview ==
A complete performance of the piece takes about four minutes. The piece received its premiere at The Town Hall in New York City on 10 October 1948 by the mezzo-soprano Marion Bell and the pianist Edwin McArthur. The piece is dedicated to the singer Jennie Tourel who frequently accompanied Bernstein. The first recording was made by Bernstein and Tourel in 1949.

The songs are recipes from the 1899 French cookery book La Bonne Cuisine Française (Tout ce qui a rapport à la table, manuel-guide pour la ville et la campagne) ("Fine French Cooking (Everything That Has to Do with the Table, Manual Guide for City and Country")) by Emile Dumont. Bernstein owned the book for many years. Bernstein translated the recipes into English. It is Bernstein's only song cycle composed for the French language.

The ingredients of nutmeg and a 'glass of brandy' are missing from the "Civet à toute vitesse" ("Rabbit at Top Speed") recipe in its incarnation here as a song. "Plum Pudding" appears in the cookery book under a section of 'English Dishes' and 'Tavouk Guenksis' is adapted from a section on 'Turkish Pastry and Sweets'. The latter is a variant spelling of tavukgöğsü, a milk pudding made with shredded chicken breast. Bernstein's score notes the plum pudding recipe should be sung "tone preciso e senza espressione" or "rather grim".

Paul Laird, in his 2002 book, Leonard Bernstein: A Guide to Research, wrote that Bernstein was "often at his best when writing humorous music" and that his "wit shines through" in the piece. Laird felt that the "finale is particularly effective".

The work was sung at the Museum of Modern Art in New York by Durward McDonell accompanied by the pianist Nicholas Karousatos in September 1977.

== Reception ==
The New York Times wrote in 1977 that "Food buffs are bound to be frustrated, considering the abbreviated and incomplete recipes. We may have the Concord grapes and, added with sudden color, breadcrumbs, and then, pianissimo, the spices, but we are never told whether to cook the musical mix, or for how long".

== Songs/recipes ==
1. "Plum Pudding"
2. "Queues de Boeuf ('Ox Tails')"
3. "Tavouk Guenksis"
4. "Civet à Toute Vitesse ("Rabbit at Top Speed")"
