= Olympic Hymn (Bernstein) =

Song by Leonard Bernstein

- by Leonard Bernstein
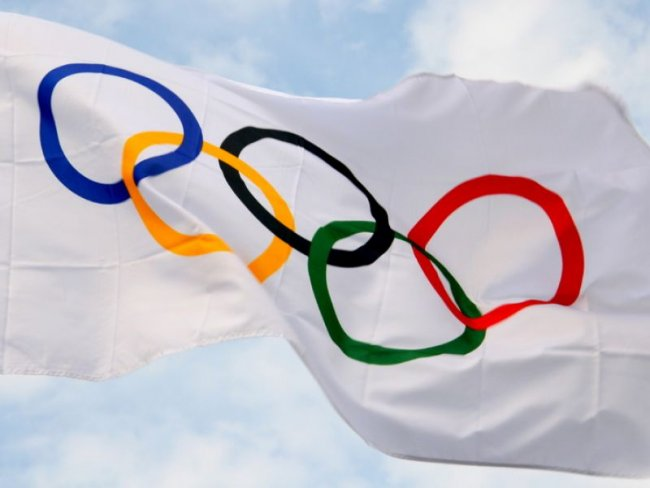
- The Olympic flag
- Composed: 1981
- Performed: 23 September 1981: Baden-Baden

The Olympic Hymn is a 1981 composition by Leonard Bernstein to a text by Günter Kunert. It was written for the International Olympic Congress of 1981 in Baden-Baden, West Germany. It was premiered by the Southwest German Radio Symphony Orchestra and the Baden-Baden Youth Choir under conductor David Shallon on 23 September 1981. The piece opened the proceedings of the International Olympic Congress.

The piece is six minutes in length.

The hymn bears some similarity to the song "To Make Us Proud" that formed the finale of Bernstein's 1976 musical 1600 Pennsylvania Avenue. The first recording of the Olympic Hymn was made by the Boston Pops Orchestra and the Tanglewood Festival Chorus under John Williams on Williams's 1996 album Summon the Heroes. Lyrics to the piece were written by the German author and poet Günter Kunert.

The piece was the last of Bernstein's compositions to be orchestrated by Hershy Kay.
