= Four Sabras =

Composition by Leonard Bernstein

- Composition for piano by Leonard Bernstein
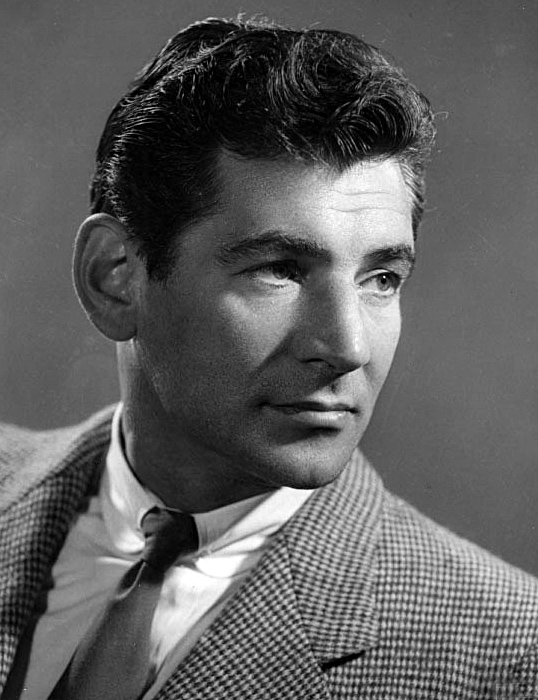
- Bernstein, c. 1950s
- Written: Possibly 1948–1957: Israel
- Duration: 6 minutes
- Movements: 4
- Scoring: Solo piano

Four Sabras is a short composition for solo piano by American composer Leonard Bernstein. Sabras (in Hebrew, צבר, "tsabár") refers to vignettes or portraits of different fictitious Israeli children.

== Background ==
Best evidence suggest it was written throughout the early 1950s (the first piece, for example, was written in 1953). It was initially entitled Six Sabras, which indicates Bernstein expected to write a total of six short pieces (a kibbutznik and a boy scout, both unnamed), but these two pieces were never eventually written. It was probably written at the request of Israeli Music Publications, possibly as a set of pieces for children. The cover of the original manuscript, where the list of pieces was specified, could be found among Bernstein's papers in Israel in 1948. The set would be eventually finished by 1956. The set of four pieces was never formally premiered, but it was recorded for the first time by Jack Gottlieb in May 1993. It was published posthumously in 2010, by Jalni Publications and Boosey & Hawkes.

== Structure ==
Four Sabras consists of four short pieces for solo piano and takes a total of six minutes to perform. The list of movements is as follows:

1. Ilana, the Dreamer. Andante teneramente
2. Idele, the Chassidele. Molto moderato
3. Yosi, the Jokester. Poco allegretto
4. Dina, the Tomboy Who Weeps Alone. Allegro — Lento — Tempo primo

The first movement is a slow and pensive piece, generally played p. It was initially conceived as an Anniversary to Cesarina Riso, but, as many other anniversaries composed by Bernstein, remained unpublished. It would also become the basis for Candide's Lament, using much of the musical material. This piece is in 3/4, with a few tempo changes towards the end. The second movement uses the term "Chassidele", which means "little Jew" (in Hebrew, חסיד, "Hasid"). It is basically a two-hand dialog between a rav, a teacher who intones lessons in a melody that is similar to Modest Mussorgsky's "Samuel" Goldenberg, played by the left hand, and Idele (possibly coming from Yudel, Bernstein's paternal grandfather's name), a young boy who is distracted, played in octaves by the left hand. The time signature is, and it is marked Rubato in the score, while the right hand is expected to play Rhythmically. The third movement is a dance-like piece, possibly referring to a friend of Bernstein's, Yossi Stern, an Israeli artist known for his cartoons. It is marked Pesante in the score and bears many time signature changes. Finally, the fourth movement is a three-part piece, the middle part later being arranged for On the Waterfront.

== Recordings ==
Here is a complete list of recordings of Four Sabras:

- Jack Gottlieb premiered the piece with Naxos in May 1993. The recording was taken at the Kilbourn Hall, Eastman School of Music at the University of Rochester, New York. It was released on CD Audio in a Jewish-themed album entitled Leonard Bernstein: A Jewish Legacy on October 21, 2003, and was later featured in the Milken Archive of Jewish Music.
- Leann Osterkamp released a complete collection of works by Bernstein on September 15, 2017, under Steinway & Sons. The recording was taken at the Steinway Hall in New York City.
- Andrew Cooperstock also recorded the piece under Bridge Records. The recording, which was taken at the Grusin Recital Hall, in University of Colorado Boulder, was included in a complete collection of Bernstein works for piano on June 13, 2017.
- Katie Mahan also recorded the piece with Deutsche Grammophon. The recording took place at the Meistersaal, in Berlin in November 2017. It was released as a digital-download-only album with Bernstein's complete solo works for piano on April 27, 2018. It was later re-released on May 4, 2018, as part of a 29-CD box set with Bernstein's complete works recorded on Deutsche Grammophon.
- Michele Tozzetti performed the piece for Piano Classics at Musicafelix - Studio Benelli Mosell, in Prato, Italy. The recording, taken between December 8 and 10, 2017, was released on CD Audio as part of a Bernstein complete piano music album on May 24, 2019.

== See also ==
- Anniversaries
