= Fanfare for the Inauguration of John F. Kennedy =

Song cycle by Leonard Bernstein

- by Leonard Bernstein
- Composed: 1961
- Performed: January 20, 1961 at the D.C. Armory in Washington, D.C.
- Duration: 30 secs to 1 min.
- Scoring: Chamber ensemble

Fanfare for the Inauguration of John F. Kennedy is a 1961 composition by Leonard Bernstein.

A complete performance of the piece lasts from 30 seconds to a minute. The fanfare received its premiere at John F. Kennedy's pre-inaugural gala at the D.C. Armory in Washington, D.C., on 20 January 1961. Bernstein and Nelson Riddle conducted it at the inaugural gala, it was orchestrated by Sid Ramin.

The piece is orchestrated for a chamber ensemble consisting of a piccolo, flute, two oboes, two clarinets, three horns, four trumpets, four trombones, a timpani, snare drum, bass drum, and cymbals.
