= Touches (Bernstein) =

Composition by Leonard Bernstein

- Chorale, Eight Variations and Coda
- Composition for piano by Leonard Bernstein
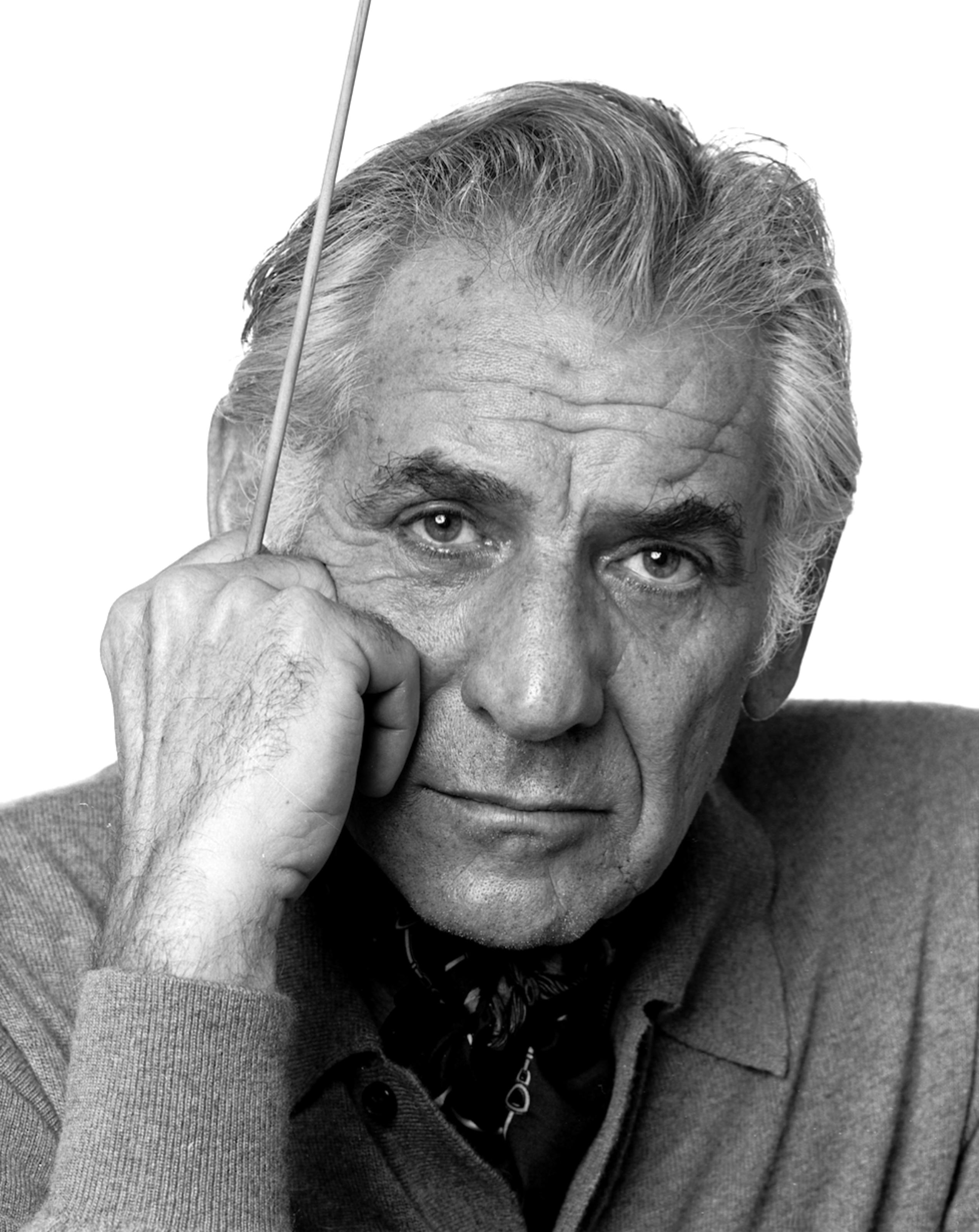
- Bernstein in 1977
- Year: 1980
- Written: July 1980: Fairfield, Connecticut
- Dedication: "To my first love, the keyboard"
- Performed: 24 May 1981: Fort Worth, Texas
- Published: 1981 - New York
- Publisher: Amberson Holdings; Leonard Bernstein Music Publishing Company; Boosey & Hawkes
- Duration: 10 minutes
- Movements: 10
- Scoring: Solo piano

Touches: Chorale, Eight Variations and Coda, often shortened as Touches (from French, "Keys"), is a composition by American composer Leonard Bernstein. Composed in 1980, it is one of Bernstein's last compositions for solo piano.

== Background ==
Touches was a commission for the sixth Van Cliburn International Piano Competition, which all the contestants were required to perform, and dedicated "to [his] first love, the keyboard". The title refers to touches, which is French for "piano keys", and the feeling of the pianist's fingers, hands, and arms while playing. It was composed in Fairfield, Connecticut in July, 1980, and premiered on May 24, 1981, at the piano competition in Fort Worth, Texas. It was subsequently published that same year by the Leonard Bernstein Music Publishing Company and Boosey & Hawkes.

== Structure ==
This 10-minute composition scored for solo piano is divided into ten short movements: a chorale, where the main theme is presented; a set of eight variations on the main theme; and a final coda. All movements are meant to be played continuously with no breaks between movements. The list of movements is as follows:

1. Chorale. Andante a piacere, molto rubato (with a blues feel)
2. (Variation 1). Vivace
3. (Variation 2). L'istesso tempo
4. (Variation 3). Più mosso
5. (Variation 4). Molto moderato — Scherzando
6. (Variation 5). Larghetto
7. (Variation 6). Andante moderato
8. (Variation 7). Allegro molto
9. (Variation 8). Vivace come II
10. Coda. Largo

A piece with relatively lower technical demands for professional pianists, Touches emphasizes expressiveness and jazzy-bluesy piano performance. Its general tone is dissonant and austere, but with strong character delineation in each variation. According to the composer, it was greatly inspired by Aaron Copland's Piano Variations, which he became enamored with as a teen, as both compositions share references to jazz and blues and have variation sets that flow easily from one section to the next. The main theme presented in the "Chorale" is similar to a piece Bernstein wrote for his daughter Jamie's 26th birthday, which was entitled Virgo Blues. It is generally conceived by critics and scholars as a fine example of Bernstein's mature style. It is often described as "austere", "solitary", and "bleak".

The general structure is somewhat circular, as the theme that is presented at the beginning in the "Chorale" is repeated in the "Coda" at the end, and Variations 1 and 8 (the first and last of the set) are not only almost identical, but also variations in the strict sense of the word, insomuch as they restate the theme with certain strange and uncommon turns. The rest of the variations differ greatly from the theme in a fashion similar to the composer's own The Age of Anxiety, each variation evolving from the preceding one and diverging further and further from the main theme.

== Recordings ==
- James Tocco recorded the piece from March 23 to 27, 1982, for an album of complete works for solo piano by Bernstein. The album was released by Pro Arte Records on compact disc in 1984.
- Bennett Lerner made a recording for Etcetera Records. The recording was released on compact disc in 1984.
- Dag Achatz performed the piece for BIS Records on November 2, 1986. The recording was taken at the Danderyd Grammar School, in Danderyd, and was released that same year on compact disc.
- Stefan Litwin also recorded the piece for Cala Records on June 19 to 21, 1995. The recording took place at Funkhaus Halberg and was released on November 24, 1998.
- Alexander Frey recorded the piece for Koch International Classics in March 1998. The piece was recorded at the First Baptist Church, in Bakersfield, California. The recording was released in an all-Bernstein album on compact disc on February 16, 1999.
- Shura Cherkassky performed the piece for Nimbus Records between February and May 1987 in their studio in Monmouthshire. The recording was released in a 7-compact-disc boxset on August 17, 1999.
- Thomas Lanners performed the piece for Centaur Records on December 13 and 14, 2003. It was recorded at the Setnor Auditorium, in Syracuse University, in Syracuse, New York.
- Winston Choi recorded the piece for Frame Records in October 2002. The recording was taken at the Church of Sant'Angelo and released in 2004.
- Zeynep Ucbasaran also recorded the piece for Eroica Classical Recordings between January 24 and 26, 2005. The recording, taken at the Abravanel Hall, in the Music Academy of the West, in Montecito, California, was released on compact disc on July 26, 2005.
- Warren Lee recorded the piece for Naxos on July 3, 2015. The recording, taken at the Wyastone Concert Hall in Monmouth, was released on compact disc in April 2016.
- Leann Osterkamp released a complete collection of works by Bernstein on September 15, 2017, under Steinway & Sons. The recording was taken at the Steinway Hall in New York City.
- Andrew Cooperstock recorded the piece under Bridge Records. The recording, which was taken at the Grusin Recital Hall, in University of Colorado Boulder, was included in a complete collection of Bernstein works for piano on June 13, 2017.
- Katie Mahan also recorded the piece with Deutsche Grammophon. The recording took place at the Meistersaal, in Berlin in November 2017. It was released as a digital-download-only album with Bernstein's complete solo works for piano on April 27, 2018. It was later re-released on May 4, 2018, as part of a 29-CD box set with Bernstein's complete works recorded on Deutsche Grammophon.
- Michael Brown also recorded the piece for First Hand Records at the American Academy of Arts and Letters, in New York City, between October 24 and 30, 2016. The recording was released on compact disc on April 6, 2018.
- Michele Tozzetti performed the piece for Piano Classics at Musicafelix - Studio Benelli Mosell, in Prato, Italy. The recording, taken between December 8 and 10, 2017, was released on compact disc on May 24, 2019.
- Bruno Vlahek recorded the piece for Croatia Records during December, 2016. The recording, taken at the Richter House Studio in Zagreb, was released on compact disc in May 2020.
