= Slava! A Political Overture =

Orchestral composition by Leonard Bernstein

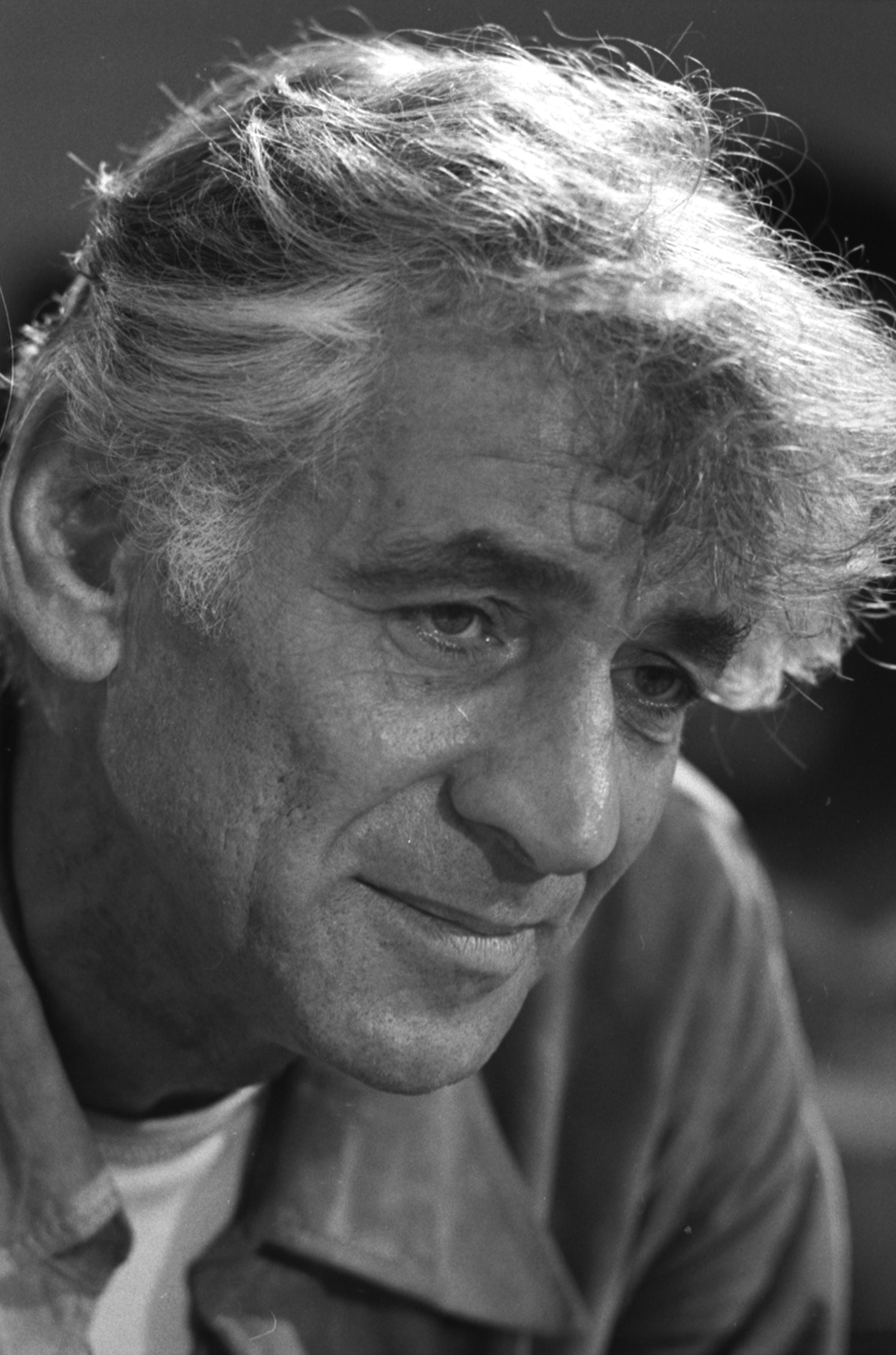
Leonard Bernstein in 1971, in a rehearsal for his Mass

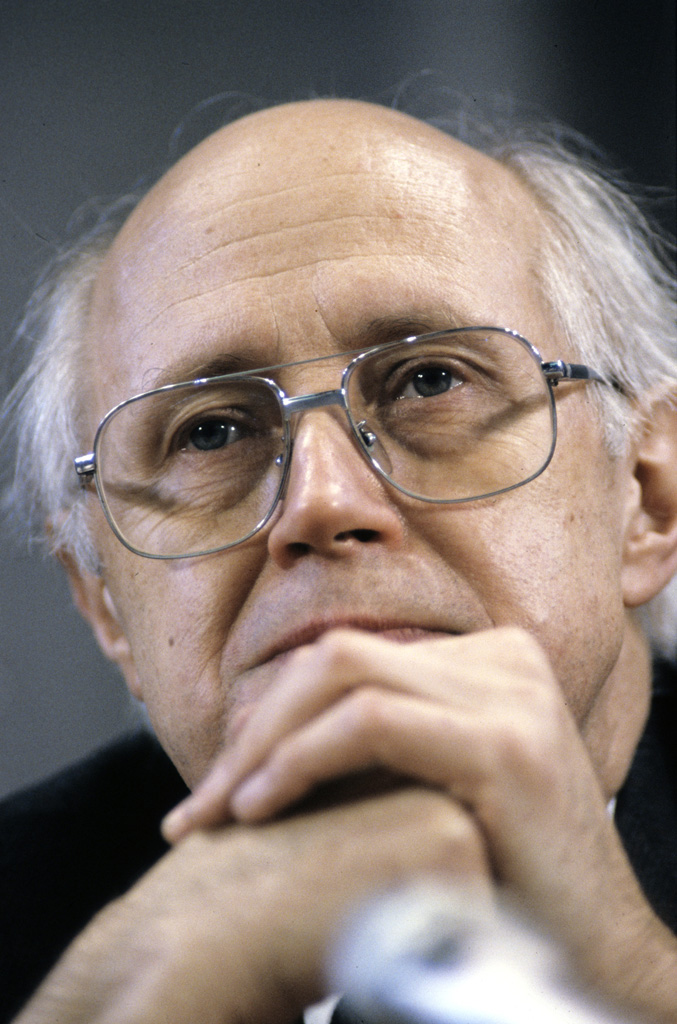
Mstislav Rostropovich

Slava! A Political Overture for Orchestra is a short orchestral composition by Leonard Bernstein. It was written for the inaugural concerts of Mstislav Rostropovich's first season with the National Symphony Orchestra in 1977. It premiered on October 11, 1977, with Rostropovich conducting.

== Premiere and influences ==
Rostropovich was known to friends as Slava, the diminutive of his given name. It is also homonymous with the Russian word for "glory". His dog Pooks is honored in the piece. The name is shouted before the 7/8 section, at the spot where the woodblock solo is heard. Although this was not written in the score, it is common for a conductor to perform the piece with it.

Critics generally responded well to the Overture. Paul Hume wrote in The Washington Post:

Its razzmatazz opening led straight into the kind of rouse-'em-up march you might have heard at a rally for William Jennings Bryan. And suddenly, from a tape somewhere back in the orchestra, came a booming voice, saying:

"If I am elected to this high office... the people are sick and tired of... give you the next President of the U... ."

== Structure ==
The overture's two main themes are based on "The Grand Old Party" and "Rehearse!" from the failed musical 1600 Pennsylvania Avenue, which ran for only seven performances on Broadway. Mid-way into the work, a pre-recorded tape of political speeches plays over an orchestral vamp. The pre-recorded tape features the voices of Bernstein, Michael Wager, Adolph Green, and Patrick O'Neal giving the political speeches. Cheering crowd noises are also used. The piece has been transcribed for symphonic band by Clare Grundman. The band version eliminates the pre-recorded tape.

The first part of the overture is the fanfare, based on "Grand Old Party", which is mostly in the time signature of 2/4. The second theme, based on "Rehearse!", is in a brighter 7/8 time signature. The section with pre-recorded tape follows. The two themes are then presented in reverse order. Near the conclusion a brief quotation of the "Slava Chorus" from the "Coronation Scene" of Mussorgsky's Boris Godunov is played against the "Rehearse!" vamp.

== Instrumentation ==
The original score calls for piccolo, 2 flutes, 2 oboes, English horn, 2 clarinets, bass clarinet, E-flat clarinet, soprano saxophone, 2 bassoons, contrabassoon, 4 horns, 3 trumpets, 3 trombones, tuba, timpani, snare drum, tenor drum, bass drum, chimes, crash cymbals, suspended cymbals, glockenspiel, ratchet, slide whistle, steel pipe, tambourine, triangle, vibraphone, xylophone, marimba, whip, wood block, electric guitar, piano, pre-recorded tape, and strings.
