= 1600 Pennsylvania Avenue (musical) =

Musical with music by Leonard Bernstein and lyrics by Alan Jay Lerner

- 1976 Broadway Playbill
- Music: Leonard Bernstein
- Lyrics: Alan Jay Lerner
- Book: Alan Jay Lerner
- Productions: 1976 Broadway

1600 Pennsylvania Avenue is a 1976 musical with music by Leonard Bernstein and book and lyrics by Alan Jay Lerner. It is considered to be a legendary Broadway flop, running only seven performances. It was Bernstein's last original score for Broadway.

== Original Broadway production ==
The musical opened on May 4, 1976, at the Mark Hellinger Theatre and closed on May 8, 1976, after 7 performances and 13 previews. It was co-directed and co-choreographed by Gilbert Moses and George Faison.

The musical examined the establishment of the White House and its occupants from 1800 to 1900. Primarily focusing on race relations, the story depicted (among other incidents) Thomas Jefferson's then-alleged affair with a black slave, James Monroe's refusal to halt slavery in Washington, the aftermath of the American Civil War and Andrew Johnson's impeachment. Throughout the show, the leading actors performed multiple roles: Ken Howard played all the presidents, Patricia Routledge all the First Ladies, and Gilbert Price and Emily Yancy played the White House servants, Lud and Seena. Future Broadway stars Reid Shelton, Walter Charles, Beth Fowler and Richard Muenz appeared in ensemble roles, as did the young African American baritone Bruce Hubbard.

The show was originally intended to be performed as a play-within-a-play, with the show's actors stepping out of character to comment on the plot and debate race relations from a modern standpoint. But this concept was almost entirely removed during the show's out-of-town tryouts in Philadelphia and Washington, D.C. The musical's original director, Frank Corsaro, choreographer, Donald McKayle, and set and costume designer, Tony Walton, left the production during these tryouts.

By the time the show opened on Broadway, little of the metatheatrical concept remained, aside from certain scenic and costume elements and a few musical references (most notably, the opening number "Rehearse!").

Discouraged by the critical and public response to the work and angry that during the tryouts much of his music had been condensed and edited without his consent, Bernstein refused to allow a cast recording of the musical.

== Critical reaction ==
The initial critical response to the show was resoundingly negative. Critics savaged Lerner's book while largely praising Bernstein's score. Only Patricia Routledge was spared, thanks mostly to her second act showstopper "Duet for One (The First Lady of the Land)" for which she received a mid-show standing ovation on opening night in New York and a mid-show standing ovation from the orchestra on closing night. After Bernstein's death a concert version of the score, retitled A White House Cantata was recorded and released. That version tended to be reviewed as a classical work rather than a Broadway musical, a tendency encouraged by the casting of the leading roles with opera singers. Differences in the score and performance style make it impossible to judge the original musical fairly from the later recording. Mark Swed called it "one of the great works of political theater," citing the poor quality of the book as a flaw. Some of the songs have enjoyed some fame outside the show including "Take Care of This House," "The President Jefferson Sunday Luncheon Party March" and "Duet for One", a tour-de-force for a single actress portraying both Julia Grant and Lucy Hayes on the day of Rutherford B. Hayes's inauguration detailing the exhausting vote counts that had many questioning his legitimacy.

Author Ethan Mordden noted that "Bernstein and Lerner created an astonishingly good score, even a synoptic all-American one, with fanfare, march, waltz, blues. It's Bernstein's most classical work for Broadway."

== Reuse of material in other works ==
As with his previously abandoned projects, Bernstein used portions of the score in subsequent works. In Songfest, for example, the setting of Walt Whitman's poem "To What You Said" as a baritone solo was a reworking of the original prelude of the show, in which the chorus hummed a melody played by the violoncello in the Songfest version. (In the show, this music was moved to the emotional low point of the second act, used as background to a Presidential funeral.) The occasional piece Slava! A Political Overture, written in honor of Bernstein's friend Mstislav Rostropovich, blended two numbers from the show, the up-tempo "Rehearse!" and "The Grand Old Party." Early in the opera A Quiet Place, the music for the aria "You're late, you shouldn't have come" derives from that of "Me," a song that in the original show established the meta-theatrical concept that was eventually abandoned. (Some of the music for "Me" can be heard in the Broadway score, most memorably in the song "American Dreaming.") An instrumental section of "The President Jefferson March" was reused in the final movement, "In Memoriam and March: The BSO Forever," of the Divertimento. Bernstein reused part of the song "To Make Us Proud" for his Olympic Hymn of 1981.

== Subsequent revivals ==
The show's only significant revival was a 1992 Indiana University Opera Theatre production, which used a pre-Philadelphia draft of the script and included portions of Bernstein's music that had been excised on the road to Broadway. This production also played briefly at the Kennedy Center in Washington, D.C., in August 1992.

== A White House Cantata ==
After Bernstein's death in 1990, the heirs of his estate sifted through the many variations and revisions of the score and authorized A White House Cantata, a choral version that deleted nearly all the remaining play-within-a-play references. (Some can still be heard in the duet "Monroviad.") BBC Radio broadcast the London debut of this work in 1997, and three years later Deutsche Grammophon released an abridged performance in a CD recording. Both the London concert and the DG recording were conducted by Kent Nagano with the London Symphony Orchestra. The Leonard Bernstein estate controls the licensing of performances of the cantata version, while the original musical is not available for license.

== Recordings of individual numbers ==
Although no cast album was made, Patricia Routledge's performance of "Duet for One" survives as a private recording in mono from the premiere, complete with standing ovation.

Individual numbers from the work have been commercially recorded and performed by a variety of notable singers. "Take Care of This House" was sung by Frederica von Stade under Bernstein's direction at the inauguration of Jimmy Carter. The song was subsequently recorded by Judy Kaye, Joanna Gleason, Julie Andrews, and opera singers Marilyn Horne and Roberta Alexander. In the 21st century "Take Care of This House" was recorded by Kelli O'Hara for the 2012 album Celebrating the American Spirit conducted by Judith Clurman, and by Barbra Streisand for her 2018 album Walls.

"The President Jefferson March" and "Duet for One" both appear in their original (pre-Broadway) versions on an EMI disc called Broadway Showstoppers, conducted by John McGlinn and sung by Davis Gaines and Judy Kaye. The late African American baritone Bruce Hubbard, a member of the original Broadway ensemble, also recorded Lud's ballad "Seena" on his album For You, For Me, which was reissued in 2005. Sarah Brightman performed "Lud's Wedding" on The Songs That Got Away, her 1989 collection of lost Broadway songs.

== Plot ==
Philadelphia:
A theater group is rehearsing a play. The time of the rehearsal is the present, and the time of the play being rehearsed is 1792 to 1902. The play being rehearsed is a history of the White House and the servants who serve the President. One actor plays all the Presidents, and one actress plays all the First Ladies. The main serving staff are the African-American characters of Lud Simmons and Seena. Three generations of adult and young Lud's are played by the same two actors. Lud is an escaped slave who later marries Seena. The events covered in the play include the selection of a new capital city, the Burning of Washington in 1814, the prelude to the U.S. Civil War, the Impeachment of Andrew Johnson, the 1876 presidential election, and the administration of Chester Alan Arthur. In between rehearsing the various scenes, the actors offer commentary and reflect on the past injustices suffered by black people throughout the time period covered by the play. This culminates in the Actor Playing the President and the Actor Playing Lud refusing to continue rehearsing the show. After reflection, the Actor Playing the President realizes all he wanted was to feel proud of his country and that he loves this land.

New York:
The four main cast members address the audience and inform them that the play covers the first one hundred years of the White House. They say America is a play that is always in rehearsal, undergoing revisions and improvements. The plot then covers the same historical material as the Philadelphia version; however, the actors' commentary is entirely removed.

== Musical numbers ==
=== Broadway ===
Act I

- "Overture" – Orchestra
- "Rehearse!" – The President, the First Lady, Lud, Seena, and entire Company
- "If I Was a Dove" – Little Lud
- "On Ten Square Miles by the Potomac River" – Washington and Delegates
- "Welcome Home Miz Adams" – Henry, Rachel and Staff
- "Take Care of This House" – John and Abigail Adams, Little Lud and Staff
- "The President Jefferson Sunday Luncheon Party March" – Jefferson, Little Lud, and Guests
- "Seena" – Lud
- "Sonatina (The British)" – Admiral Cockburn, Officers and Citizens
  - 1. Allegro con brio
  - 2. Tempo di Menuetto (including an authentic harmonization of "To Anacreon in Heav'n" (1740) later known as "The Star Spangled Banner")
  - 3. Rondo
- "Lud's Wife"
- "I Love My Wife" – Lud, Seena, and Staff
- "Auctions" – Auctioneer and Buyers
- "The Little White Lie" James and Eliza Monroe
- "We Must Have a Ball" – Buchanan
- "The Ball" – Entire Company

Act II

- "Entr'acte" – Orchestra
- "Forty Acres and a Mule" – The Staff
- "Bright and Black" – Seena and Staff
- "Duet for One (First Lady of the Land)" – Julia Grant, Lucy Hayes and Company
- "The Robber Baron Minstrel Parade" – The Minstrels
- "Pity The Poor" – The Minstrels
- "The Red, White and Blues" – The Minstrels
- "I Love This Land" – The President
- "Rehearse!" – Entire Company

=== Philadelphia premiere ===
Act I

- Prelude
- On Ten Square Miles by the Potomac River
- If I Was a Dove
- The Nation That Wasn't There
- Welcome Home, Miz Adams
- Take Care of This House
- The President Jefferson Sunday Luncheon March
- Seena
- The Nation That Wasn't There (Reprise)
- Sonatina
- The Nation That Wasn't There (Reprise)
- Lud's Wedding
- I Love My Wife
- Auctions
- The Monroviad
- This Time
- We Must Have a Ball
- Take Care of This House and The Nation That Wasn't There (Reprise)

Act II

- Philadelphia
- Uncle Tom's Funeral
- Bright and Black
- The Duet for One
- Hail Garfield
- Hail Arthur
- The Money-Loving Minstrel Parade
- Pity the Poor
- The Grand Ol' Party
- The Red, White, and Blues
- American Dreaming
- To Make Us Proud

=== Other musical numbers ===
- Me (New Opening) – used in 1992 Indiana University production
- Reclamation Scene ("Can You Love") – unused
- What Happened – used in 1992 Indiana University production
- A Star at Noon – unused
- The Switch – unused
- We – unused
- It's My Country (Mr. Lincoln) – orchestrated, but unused
- Welcome Home, Miz Johnson – used in A White House Cantata
