= Thirteen Anniversaries =

Collection of piano pieces by Leonard Bernstein

- Piano music by Leonard Bernstein
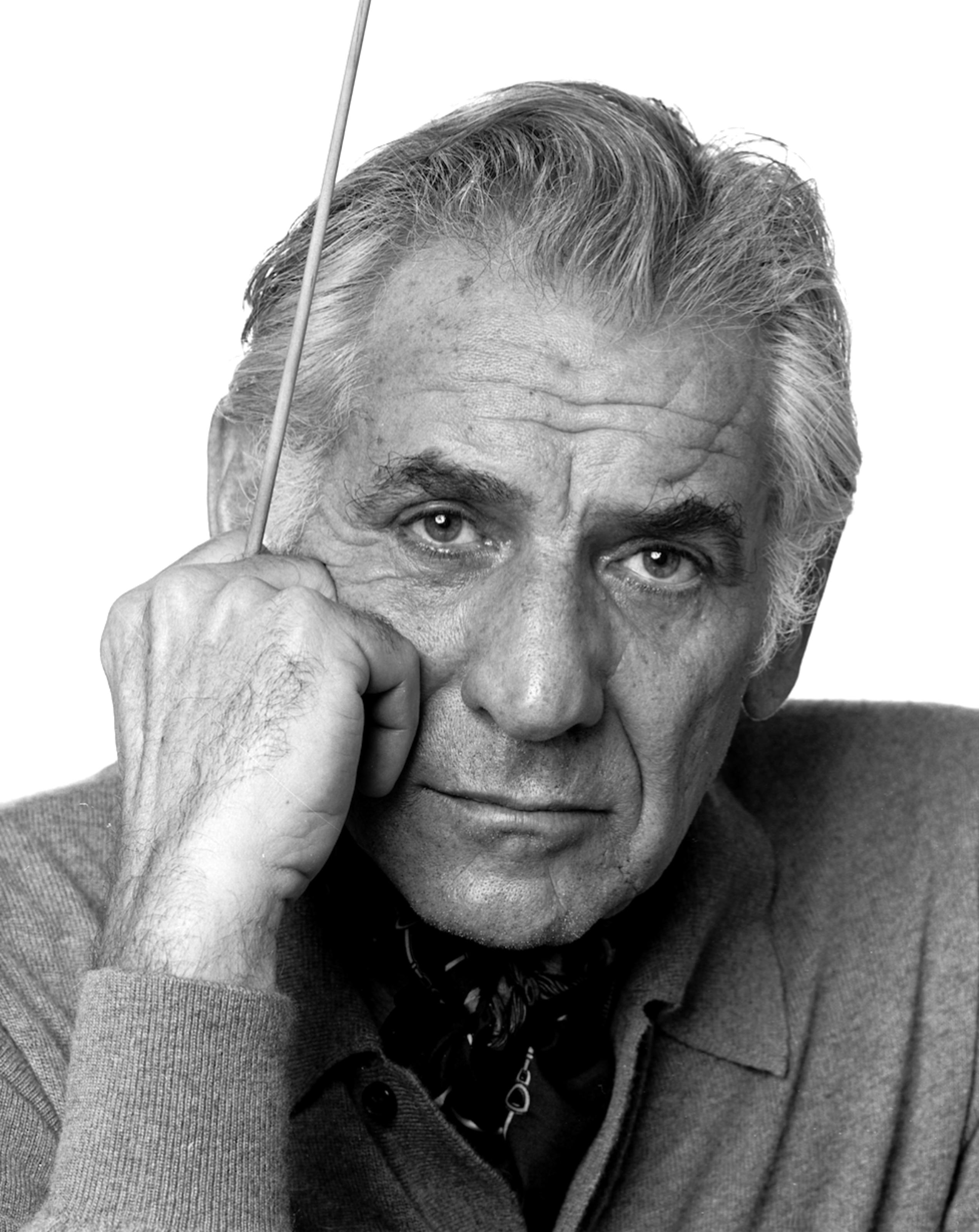
- The composer
- Related: No. 12 basis for Opening Prayer
- Published: 1988
- Movements: 13

Thirteen Anniversaries is a composition for solo piano by Leonard Bernstein, published in 1988, commemorating 13 people who played an important role in his life.

== Background ==
Bernstein wrote this set after similar collections, Seven Anniversaries (1943), Four Anniversaries (1948) and Five Anniversaries (1949–1951). Each movement celebrates a person. Some movements are dedicated to a person close to the one commemorated. The work was given its first performance by Alexander Frey in Berlin in 1998.

== Movements ==
The titles, referencing the persons, are:

1. For Shirley Gabis Rhoades Perle
2. In Memoriam: William Kapell (an American pianist who died young in a plane crash).
3. For Stephen Sondheim
4. For Craig Urquhart
5. For Leo Smit (an American composer)
6. For My Daughter, Nina
7. In Memoriam: Helen Coates (one of Bernstein's most esteemed teachers)
8. In Memoriam: Goddard Lieberson (former executive of Columbia Records)
9. For Jessica Fleishmann
10. In Memoriam: Constance Hope
11. For Felicia, on our 28th Birthday (and her 52nd)
12. For Aaron Stern
13. In Memoriam: Ellen Goetz

== Sources ==
- Horowitz, Mark Eden. Leonard Bernstein Collection. Library of Congress. 11 February 2008.
- Truesdell, F. Donald. “The Complete Works for Solo Piano by Leonard Bernstein.” American Music, vol. 4, no. 1 (British-American Musical Interactions, Spring, 1986). pp. 120–21.
