= Bridal Suite (Bernstein) =

Composition by Leonard Bernstein

- in 2 Parts with 3 Encores
- Composition for solo piano by Leonard Bernstein
- Bridal Suite appeared on the 2017 album by Leann Osterkamp
- Occasion: Adolph and Phyllis Green's wedding
- Composed: 1960
- Published: 1989
- Publisher: Jalni Publications; Boosey & Hawkes
- Duration: 10 minutes
- Movements: 11

Bridal Suite is a suite for two pianists by American composer Leonard Bernstein. Composed in 1960, it was written for Phyllis Newman's wedding with Adolph Green.

== Background ==
Bridal Suite was written on the occasion of lyricist-writer Adolph Green's wedding with actress Phyllis Newman in 1960. The title was meant to have a double meaning, both referring to the meaning of suite in music and the bridal suite in a hotel. It was initially intended to be performed by the Greens, probably at their wedding, with Adolph playing the bottom part with both hands and Phyllis playing the top part with one hand. The couple, having never received sufficient formal piano training, were "never ... able to achieve that three-handed feat to our complete satisfaction—or anyone else's." The piece was dedicated "for Adolph and Phyllis Green." It was subsequently published just one year before the composer's death by Jalni Publications and Boosey & Hawkes in 1989.

== Structure ==
The piece is scored for two pianists on one piano. According to Bernstein's specifications, it is written for two, three, and four hands. It is divided into two parts and three obligatory encores. The suite is divided into eleven movements and has an approximate duration of ten minutes. The structure is as follows:

- Part I
  - Prelude. Moderato
  - Three Variations on Adolph F♯yllis Green
    1. Love Song. Very slowly, with warmth
    2. Chaplinesque. Andantino
    3. Chaplinade. Valse lente
- Part II
  - Interlude (Bell, Book, and Rabbi). Andante, un poco mesto
  - Three Wedding Dances
    1. The First Waltz (Canon). Moderato — Trio — Moderato
    2. Cha-cha-cha. Moderato, with elegance
    3. Hora. Fast and Jewish
- Three Encores (Obligatory)
  1. Modern Music (Argument). Scherzando — Furioso
  2. Old Music (Reconciliation). Adagio
  3. Magyar Lullaby. With a gentle swing

According to the specifications in the score, the initial prelude can be performed at the end of the suite as a fourth encore in case it is demanded by the public, but it is not obligatory.

=== Movements ===
The suite is made up of very short sketches for piano. The Prelude in C major is the longest movement in the suite. Scored for three hands, the second player uses both hands to play Johann Sebastian Bach's Prelude from Prelude and Fugue in C major, BWV 846, from The Well-Tempered Clavier, unaltered, while the first player joins in after two bars playing the main melody of "Just in Time", from the Betty Comden, Adolph Green, and Jule Styne score for Bells Are Ringing. Initially marked Moderato, it changes to Poco meno mosso four bars before the end, when the first player performs a short quotation from Richard Strauss's Don Juan. It has a total of 35 bars.

The Three Variations are based on the three notes from the names of both the bride and groom: A, F♯, and G. These variations are not based on a specific theme, but rather on the sequence specified in the title. The first variation is a very slow piece in D major, 26 bars in length, with both first and second pianists playing with just one hand. The lively second variation is 21 bars long and is in F♯ minor: the second pianists plays an accompaniment with both hands to the melody played with one hand by the first pianist. The last variation is initially marked Valse lente (Tempo I), but switches tempo back and forth very frequently with the Tempo II, marked Suddenly faster. Fluctuating between D major and F major, it has a total of 36 bars

The second part starts with an interlude, where each pianist is expected to play the piece with one hand (except the second pianist which may play the last chords with both hands). The piece is in A minor, modulating to B♭ minor only to come back to A minor in the last few bars. Totalling 26 bars, it is a slow movement where the accompaniment constantly plays quarter-note triad chords.

The first of the Three Wedding Dances is meant to be played attacca with the preceding movement. It is a two-part canon where "he leads" (the second pianist) and "she follows" (the first pianist), both with their right hand. The movement has an ABA Scherzo structure, where both the first and last scherzo sections are in A major and the Trio is in C major. It has a total of 45 bars. The second dance, 20 bars in length, also has a ternary structure. With a very rhythmic character, it is scored for four hands and is in F major, the middle section being in A♭ major. The third dance has many time signature and key signature changes. A fast and relatively complex movement, it has a total of 19 bars (or 25 bars with repetitions) and is scored for four hands.

The Three Encores are not meant to be skipped. The first movement consists of a 12-tone row presented by the first pianist at the beginning, which is later exhibited backwards, upside-down and in a retrograde inversion. After that, a second section ensues, marked Furioso, where both pianos play different versions of the row simultaneously. It has 19 bars. The slow, 14-bar second encore, in F♯ minor, is a very loose canon where both pianists play a similar melody. The third encore is 16 bars long and is in 6/8. The second pianist is required to use both hands, while the first is expected only to play the melody with one.

== Recordings ==
As of 2022, the suite has only been recorded in collections of Bernstein's complete piano music output. The following is a list of recordings of Bridal Suite:

- Andrew Cooperstock made the world premiere recording of this piece under Bridge Records. The recording, which was taken at the Grusin Recital Hall, in University of Colorado Boulder, took place on June 13, 2017.
- Leann Osterkamp recorded the piece on September 15, 2017, under Steinway & Sons. The recording was taken at the Steinway Hall in New York City.
