= Four Anniversaries =

Piano composition by Leonard Bernstein

Anniversaries
- Piano music by Leonard Bernstein
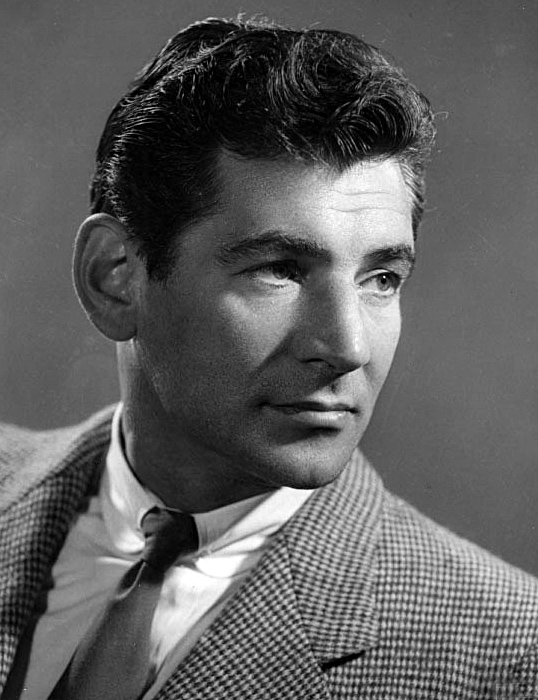
- The composer in the 1950s
- Dedication: Felicia Montealegre; Johnny Mehegan; David Diamond; Helen Coates
- Published: 1948
- Movements: four

Four Anniversaries is a composition for piano written in 1948 by the American composer Leonard Bernstein.

== Background ==
Four Anniversaries consists of four movements, each written for a different person in Bernstein’s life. Leonard Bernstein composed four works using the same concept: Seven Anniversaries (1943), Four Anniversaries (1948), Five Anniversaries (1949–1951), and Thirteen Anniversaries (completed 1988). Each movement celebrates the birthday of a different individual, such as Serge Koussevitzky, Paul Bowles, William Schuman, Stephen Sondheim, and Aaron Copland. The Four Anniversaries are dedicated to Felicia Montealegre, Johnny Mehegan, David Diamond, and Helen Coates.

Critic Herbert Livingston described Four Anniversaries:

The first written with restraint and cultivated lyricism, is serene and song-like. There follows a short waspish scherzo, interesting principally for the rhythmic surprises; a slow elegiac piece freely contrapuntal in structure: and a vigorous finale, also predominantly contrapuntal, involving sudden extreme dynamic changes.

It was first performed by Eunice Podis on October 1, 1948 in Cleveland, Ohio.

== Movements ==
- "For Felicia Montealegre (February 6, 1922)". The first movement was written for Leonard Bernstein’s wife Felicia Montealegre, a Chilean actress. This movement is marked Tranquillo: piacevole and then Pochissimo più mosso, which means "a little faster". The movement begins at piano and ends on pianississimo which sets the mood for the next movement.
- "For Johnny Mehegan (June 6, 1920)". The second movement is dedicated to Johnny Mehegan, a jazz pianist. Marked Agitato: scherzando, this movement has the playful feel of a scherzo and the syncopation of what could be heard of as jazz improvisation. To balance the first movement, it begins at pianississimo where the first movement leaves off and ends pianissimo.
- "For David Diamond (July 9, 1915)". The third movement was composed for David Leo Diamond, also an established composer. “His music was characterized by its classic structures and its strong melodic sense.” This movement represents the style of Diamond. There is a strong sense of melody line and character and because it is marked Andantino, the flowing melody line can be linked to the first movement. Like the previous two movements, this movement begins softly starting on piano and ending on pianissimo.
- "For Helen Coates (July 19, 1899)". Helen Coates was a long time friend to Leonard Bernstein. She was not only his piano instructor as a child but later became his personal secretary. It is no wonder then that the last movement is the longest and the most technically difficult. This is the only movement to begin and end on forte.

== Conclusion ==
The four movements complement each other in that while they remain unique and representative of the unique person they were written for. The piece takes its form from the baroque sonata da chiesa form by alternating the movements from slow-fast-slow-fast. There are common themes and a sense of tonality that help to bring the work together. Donald Truesdell quotes James Tocco, pianist, who gets to the heart of the piece:

Lenny may disagree with me but one finds much more about him in the Anniversaries than the people to whom they are dedicated. I sense that Lenny may have been attracted to certain characteristics of a personality that in some way reflected something in himself-aspects of his own personality that he wished to develop.

Leonard Bernstein composed Four Anniversaries for the Piano to commemorate the birthdays of four important people in his life and the result is four individual movements that form one coherent piece.

== Sources ==
- Anderson, Martin. "Review: A Bernstein Cornucopia." Tempo, new series, no. 180. (March 1992), pp. 44–49.
- Anon. “Diamond, David Leo,” In Britannica Book of the Year, 2006. Encyclopædia Britannica Online, 11 2008, <http://www.britannica.com>
- Horowitz, Mark Eden. “About the Leonard Bernstein Collection.” The Leonard Bernstein Collection. Library of Congress. 11 February 2008. http://memory.loc.gov/ammem/lbhtml/lbabout.html
- Livingston, Herbert, "Reviewed Work(s): Four Anniversaries by Leonard Bernstein," Notes, 2nd Ser., vol. 7, no. 1. (Dec., 1949), p. 141.
- Truesdell, F. Donald. “The Complete Works for Solo Piano by Leonard Bernstein.” American Music, vol. 4, no. 1 (British-American Musical Interactions, Spring, 1986). pp. 120–21.
