= Peter Pan (1950 musical) =

1950 musical adaptation

album of original Bernstein stage adaptation

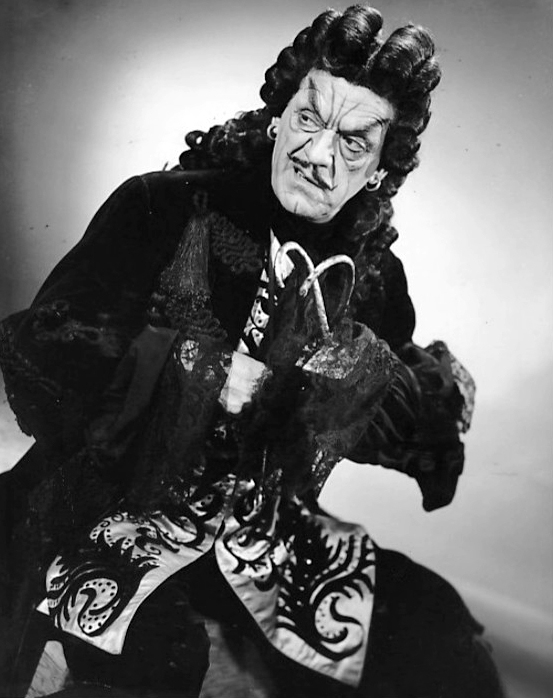
Boris Karloff as Captain Hook in the 1950 musical production of Peter Pan

Peter Pan is a 1950 musical adaptation of J. M. Barrie's 1904 play Peter Pan, or The Boy Who Wouldn't Grow Up with music and lyrics by Leonard Bernstein; it opened on Broadway on April 24, 1950. This version starred Jean Arthur as Peter Pan, Boris Karloff in the dual roles of George Darling and Captain Hook, and Marcia Henderson as Wendy. The show was orchestrated by Trude Rittmann and Hershy Kay and conducted by Benjamin Steinberg. The show ran for 321 performances, closing on January 27, 1951.

The production was initially intended as a full-blown musical, with Bernstein composing a complete score for it, but was staged with only five songs – "Who Am I?", "Pirate's Song", "Plank Round", "Build My House", and "Peter Peter" – to accommodate the limited vocal ranges of the principals.

In 1998, conductor Alexander Frey began research into whether there may have existed more material that Bernstein had composed for Peter Pan. Over the next seven years, as his schedule allowed, he discovered and restored almost an hour of previously unheard music, much of the material found (and not yet orchestrated) in the archives of the composer's manuscripts. The restored songs included "Captain Hook Soliloquy" and "Dream With Me", as well as other sung material, dance music and orchestral interludes. The world premiere recording of Bernstein's complete score was released on CD in 2005, conducted by Alexander Frey, featuring Broadway star Linda Eder in the role of Wendy Darling and acclaimed baritone Daniel Narducci as Captain Hook, on the Koch International Classics label.

In December 2006, it was produced for the stage by The King's Head Theatre in Islington, London, with Katherine Kastin as Peter Pan, Peter Land as Captain Hook, and Rafaella Hutchinson as Tinker Bell, directed by Stephanie Sinclaire and featuring new musical arrangements by Mike Dixon. This production used only parts of the Bernstein score and none of the original orchestrations. The music was performed by an instrumental trio.

In September 2008 the world premiere performance of the full Bernstein score was performed in concert with Alexander Frey conducting the Gulbenkian Orchestra, with dialogue adapted from the original J. M. Barrie play by Nina Bernstein Simmons. Three performances were given in Cascais, Portugal, for a combined audience of over 10,000 people; they featured Geraldine James (narrator), John Sackville-West (Peter Pan), Charlotte Ellett and Rachel Nicholls (Wendy) and Nicholas Lester (Captain Hook).

The first stage production of the full Bernstein score was given by Santa Barbara Theater (California) in December 2008, directed by Albert Ihde with a full orchestra again conducted by Alexander Frey.

Another production was held at the Richard B. Fisher Center for the Performing Arts in June 2018, directed by Christopher Alden.

== Musical numbers ==
Song title
Prelude - Act I
Who Am I?
Peter's Tears
Shadow Dance
Flight to Neverland
Flight Music
Prelude - Act II
Pirate Song
Croc Music
Wendy's Entrance
Build My House
Scene Change
Neverland
Pirate's Song (Reprise)
Lagoon Fight
Scene Change
Peter Peter
Indian-Pirate Fight
Hook's Poison
Tinker Bell Sick- Tink Lives!
Captain Hook's Soliloquy
Prelude - Act III
Crew Dance
Plank Round
Fight
Scene Change
Dream With Me
Underscore
Scene Change

== Sources ==
- "Peter Pan: Build My House Lyrics". Decoda. Decoda. Archived from the original on 2014-09-04.
