= Seven Anniversaries =

Collection of piano pieces by Leonard Bernstein

- Piano music by Leonard Bernstein
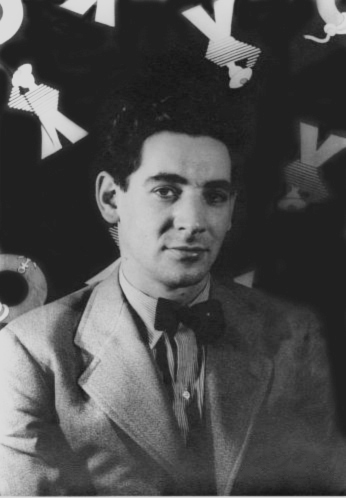
- The composer in 1944
- Composed: 1942–1943 in Boston and New York City
- Dedication: Aaron Copland; Shirley Bernstein; Alfred Eisner; Paul Bowles; Natalie Koussevitzky; Serge Koussevitzky; William Schuman
- Performed: 1943 – WNYC Radio, New York City
- Published: 1944
- Duration: 6 minutes
- Movements: 7
- Scoring: Piano

Seven Anniversaries is a collection of short piano pieces by American composer Leonard Bernstein, written between 1942 and 1943. It is the first installment in a series of Anniversaries, followed by Four Anniversaries (1948), Five Anniversaries (1949–51), and Thirteen Anniversaries (1988).

== Composition ==
The first set of Anniversaries was composed in Boston and New York City between 1942 and the fall of 1943, at about the time that he became famous as assistant director of the New York Philharmonic. It was first performed by the composer at the WNYC Radio in 1943. The first concert performance took place at the Boston Opera House, Massachusetts, on May 14, 1944. As in the case of all the other Anniversaries, Seven Anniversaries was dedicated to many different people who played an important role in Bernstein's life, even though, in this case, most of the dedicatees were musicians. Aaron Copland and Serge Koussevitzky were two of Bernstein's most important mentors; Natalie Koussevitzky, who was Serge's second wife, died in January 1942; composers Paul Bowles and William Schuman were both good friends of his. Alfred Eisner, one of Bernstein's roommates during his senior year at Harvard, died when he was 23; finally, Shirley Bernstein was Leonard's closest confidante. Seven Anniversaries was published in 1944 by M. Witmark & Sons.

== Structure ==
This collection of seven pieces has a total duration of around six minutes. The movement list is as follows:

1. For Aaron Copland (Nov. 14, 1900). Allegretto semplice
2. For My Sister, Shirley (Oct. 3, 1923). Con moto
3. In Memoriam: Alfred Eisner (Jan. 4, 1941). Andante serioso, un poco rubato — Molto più mosso — Tempo I
4. For Paul Bowles (Dec. 31, 1910). Moderato, senza calore
5. In Memoriam: Nathalie Koussevitzky (Jan. 15, 1942). Lento non troppo (Note: Natalie Koussevitzky's name is spelled as Nathalie in the original score)
6. For Sergei Koussevitzky (July 26, 1874). Adagio (Note: Serge Koussevitzky's name is spelled as Sergei in the original score)
7. For William Schuman (Aug. 4, 1910). Agitato, non troppo presto

The fifth movement contains material that was also used in the first movement of Bernstein's first symphony, Jeremiah, composed in 1942.
