= Five Anniversaries =

Collection of piano pieces by Leonard Bernstein

- Piano music by Leonard Bernstein
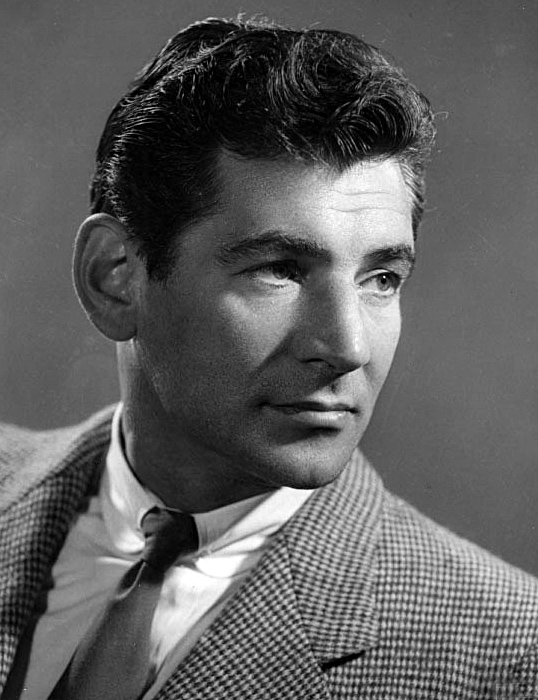
- The composer in the 1950s
- Composed: 1949–1951
- Dedication: Elizabeth Rudolf; Lukas Foss; Elizabeth B. Ehrman; Sandy Gellhorn; Susanna Kyle
- Published: 1964
- Duration: 7 minutes
- Movements: 5
- Scoring: Piano

Five Anniversaries is a set of short pieces for piano by American composer Leonard Bernstein and the third installment in the series of Anniversaries for piano. It was composed between 1949 and 1951. It is known for presenting some of the musical ideas that were later developed in other works.

== Composition ==
Bernstein's Anniversaries are short pieces that were dedicated to different people that played different parts in his life. The other three installments were Seven Anniversaries (1942–43), Four Anniversaries (1948), and 13 Anniversaries (1988). Generally, the anniversaries were dedicated to other musicians or people that were important to the composer. Unlike the other sets, this composition's dedicatees are mostly lesser-known friends of Bernstein, except for fellow pianist and collaborator Lukas Foss, with whom Bernstein first recorded his Second Symphony. The last two movements were dedicated to friends' children. Sandy Gellhorn was the adopted son of Martha Gellhorn and Susanna Kyle is Betty Comden's daughter, born in 1949. The other two were Elizabeth Rudolf, a friend's mother, and Elizabeth Ehrman, college friend Kenneth Ehrman's mother.

The whole set was composed between 1949 and 1951 and it was initially published by Jalni Publications in 1964, Amberson Holdings being the copyright holder and Boosey & Hawkes the sole agent.

== Structure ==
This seven-minute set of Anniversaries consists of five short movements. The movement list is as follows:

1. For Elizabeth Rudolf (born Jan. 23, 1894). Allegretto
2. For Lukas Foss (born Aug. 15, 1922). Allegro con anima
3. For Elizabeth B. Ehrman (born Jan. 22, 1883). Gay
4. For Sandy Gellhorn (born April 23, 1951). Grazioso
5. For Susanna Kyle (born July 24, 1949). Peacefully

The first three movements of the set include music that Bernstein used years later in Serenade after Plato's "Symposium", in 1954. In particular, Rudolf is found in the A section of the second movement, Aristophanes; Foss appears in the B section of the same movement; finally, material from Ehrman is found in the finale, beginning three measures after rehearsal number 30. The last two movements, on the other hand, are not related to Bernstein's Serenade. Gellhorn is a quick and jazzy movement united by dotted rhythms and the last movement, Kyle, is a Copland-like movement, that was also used in the Prelude to Act II of Peter Pan, finished in 1950.
