= Heinrich Gebhard =

German-American pianist, composer and piano teacher

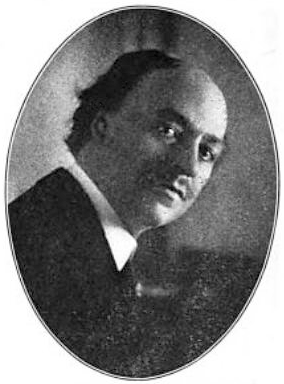
- In Musical Advance, July 1924
- Born: July 25, 1878; Sobernheim, Germany
- Died: May 5, 1963 (aged 84); North Arlington, New Jersey, US
- Occupations: Pianist, composer, teacher

Heinrich Gebhard (July 25, 1878 – May 5, 1963) was a German-American pianist, composer and piano teacher.

== Performer ==
Gebhard was born in Sobernheim, Germany on July 25, 1878. He moved at the age of 10 with his parents to Boston, Massachusetts in the United States, where he studied piano and composition with Clayton Johns until 1895. He went to Vienna, Austria for four years, where he studied under Theodor Leschetizky, and returned to Boston in 1899. He made his piano debut in 1900 with the Boston Symphony Orchestra. He enjoyed a lengthy career as one of the notable American pianists of the early 20th century. Later in his career, he became a music teacher and taught a number of other famous pianists, most notably Leonard Bernstein. The composers Peggy Stuart Coolidge, Alan Hovhaness, and Ruth Roberts also studied with him.

== Composer ==
Gebhard composed music for piano, chamber orchestra and symphony orchestra. His Fantasy for Piano and Orchestra was given its first performance by the New York Philharmonic on November 12, 1925, with the composer at the piano. Among Gebhard's other works are the symphonic poem, Across the Hills (1940), Divertimento for Piano and Chamber Orchestra (1927), Waltz Suite for two pianos, the song cycle, The Sun, Cloud and the Flower and numerous works for piano.

Gebhard's book, The Art of Pedaling, was published posthumously in 1963.

== Later life ==
Gebhard died in North Arlington, New Jersey on May 5, 1963.
