= Young People's Concerts =

New York Philharmonic youth concerts

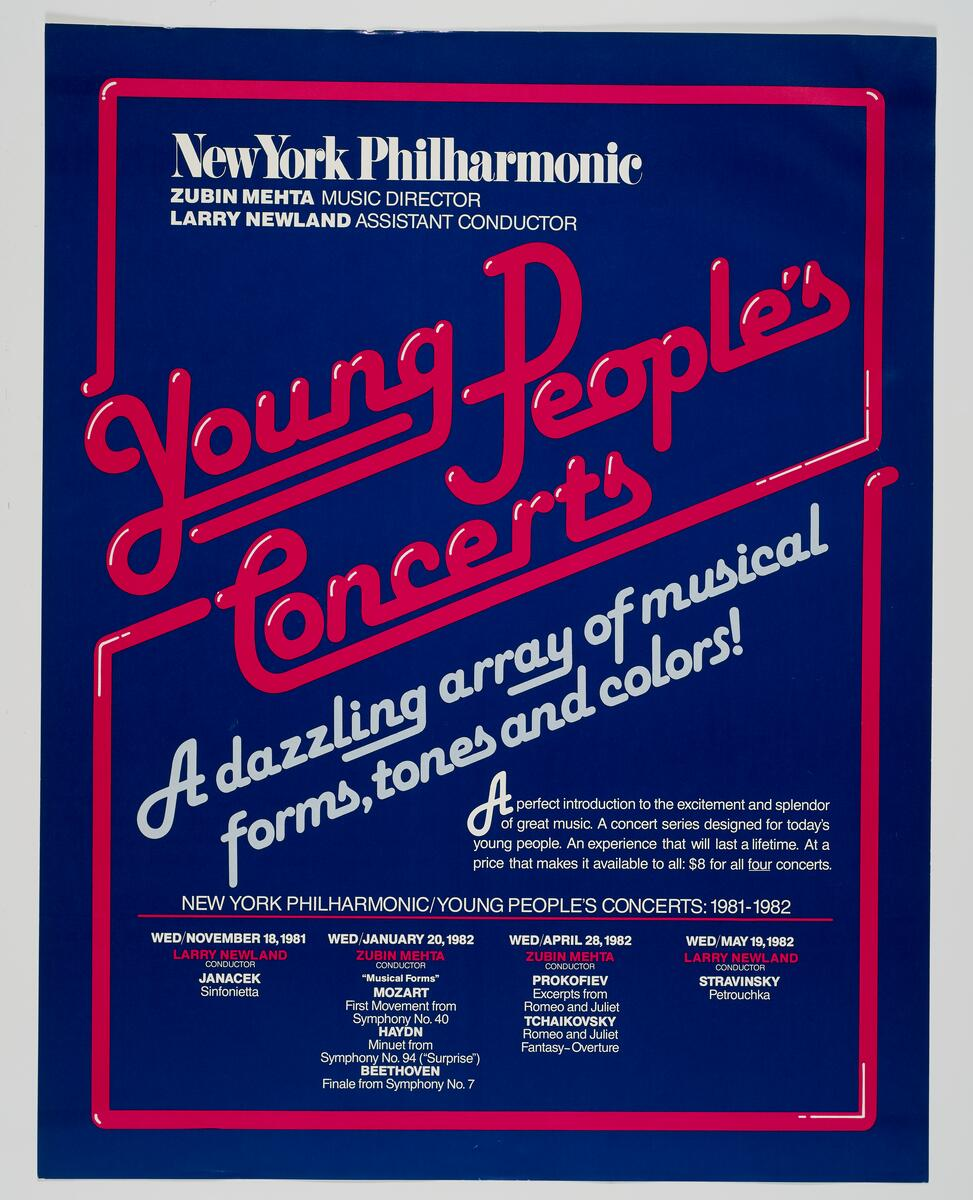
- Abbreviation: YPC
- Formation: 1924; 102 years ago
- Founder: Ernest Schelling
- Type: Orchestral music
- Key people: Leonard Bernstein, conductor (1958-72)
- Parent organization: New York Philharmonic
- Subsidiaries: Very Young People's Concerts
- Affiliations: CBS
- Award: 4 Emmy Awards
- Website: https://nyphil.org/education/family-programs/ypc-family

The Young People's Concerts with the New York Philharmonic are the longest-running series of family concerts of classical music in the world.

== Symphony concerts for young people in New York City (before 1924) ==
On November 26, 1898, conductor Frank Damrosch and the New York Symphony Orchestra, presented one of the first orchestra concerts in New York City directed at a younger audience, entitled "Symphony Concert for Young People". A year prior, in 1897, Damrosch was named the head of music education for New York City's public schools because of his social mission to teach music to impoverished New Yorkers.

Decades later, between 1914–16, the New York Philharmonic's music director Josef Stránský began leading concerts for young people.

== Founding of an annual concert series (1924–1939) ==
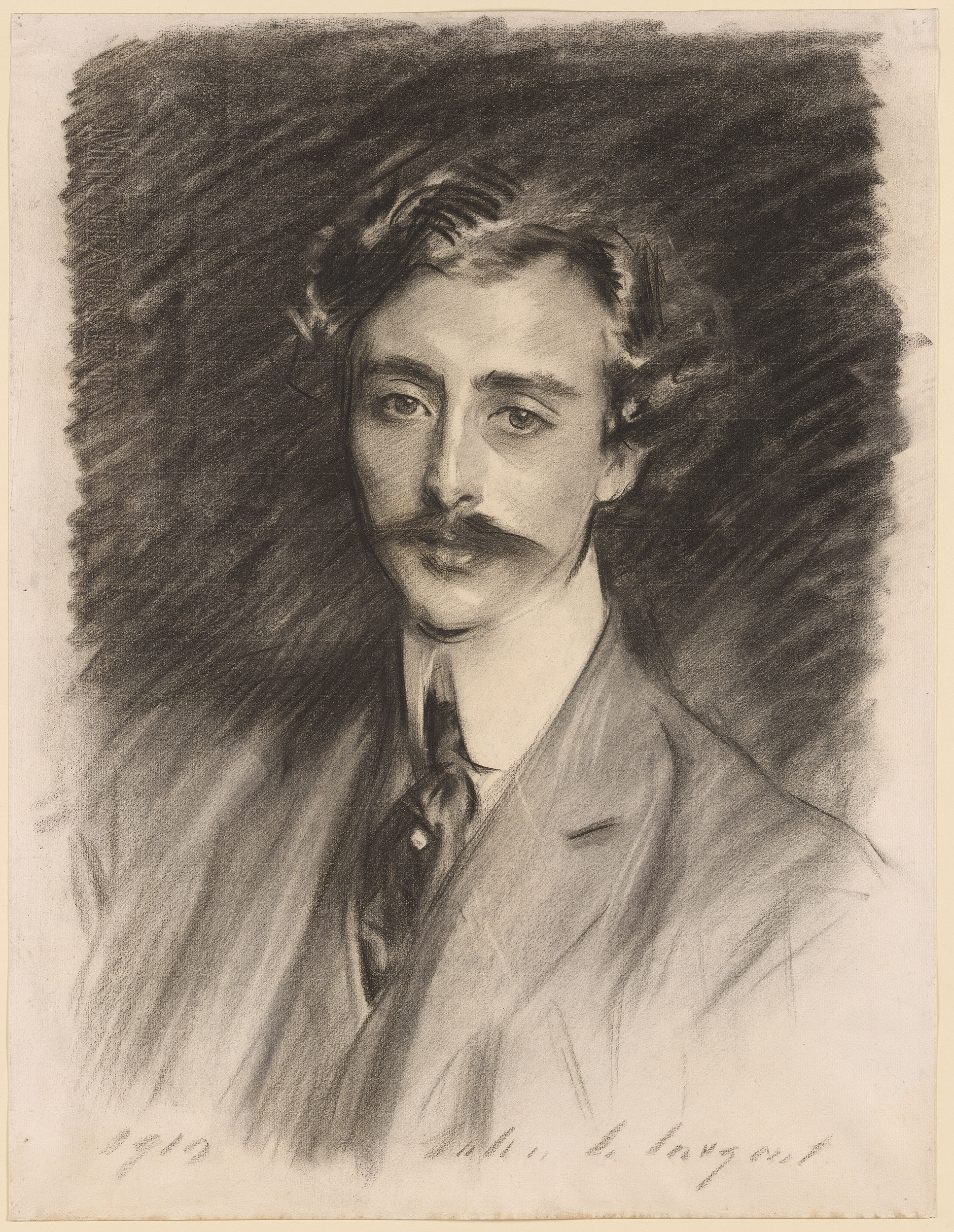
Conductor Ernest Schelling, by John Singer Sargent

The New York Philharmonic's annual "Young People's Concerts" series was founded in 1924 by conductor "Uncle" Ernest Schelling and Mary Williamson Harriman and Elizabeth "Bessie" Mitchell, co-chairs of the philharmonic's Educational and Children's Concerts Committee. Schelling designed the concerts to encourage a love of music in children, augmenting the music with demonstrations and talks featuring picture slideshows about composers, instruments, history, and other educational topics. Schelling created over 4,000 magic lantern glass slides to showcase a variety of subjects.

Beginning in 1930, the Young People's Concerts were broadcast as a parallel feature with the philharmonic's Sunday concerts on CBS Radio to homes across the United States and in Europe. Schelling and the philharmonic also went directly into New York City's public schools, presenting "School Day" concerts to young students.

The Young People's Concerts became popular with children and their parents, as well as music lovers of all ages. In his first ten years, Schelling led two series of five to six concerts each season. In addition to presenting concerts for children in New York, Schelling also presented concerts on the road in cities such as Los Angeles, Philadelphia, Rotterdam, and London. Schelling conducted the Young People's Concerts with the New York Philharmonic from 1924 until his death in 1939.

== After Schelling (1940–1958) ==
Following Schelling's death in 1939, the Young People's Concerts were taken over by Swiss conductor Rudolph Ganz, from 1940 to 1947. Ganz had initially planned six concerts each season at Carnegie Hall, plus a series of three "Elementary", or "Introductory", concerts at New York City's Town Hall for "children with little or no musical training" under the age of nine. However, the Elementary concerts were suspended in 1942 due to World War II and did not resume again until 1947.

In 1947, the Young People's Concert Committee held interviews for the series' next conductor. The committee voted American conductor Walter Hendl, who went on to lead four concerts. Other conductors were vying for the position, including a young Leonard Bernstein, who had only debuted with the philharmonic four years prior. Bernstein received only three votes and would not conduct a Young People's Concert until he became music director in 1958.

In 1950, American conductor Igor Buketoff was placed at the helm of all the philharmonic's children's concerts, following his first guest appearance in the role just two years prior.

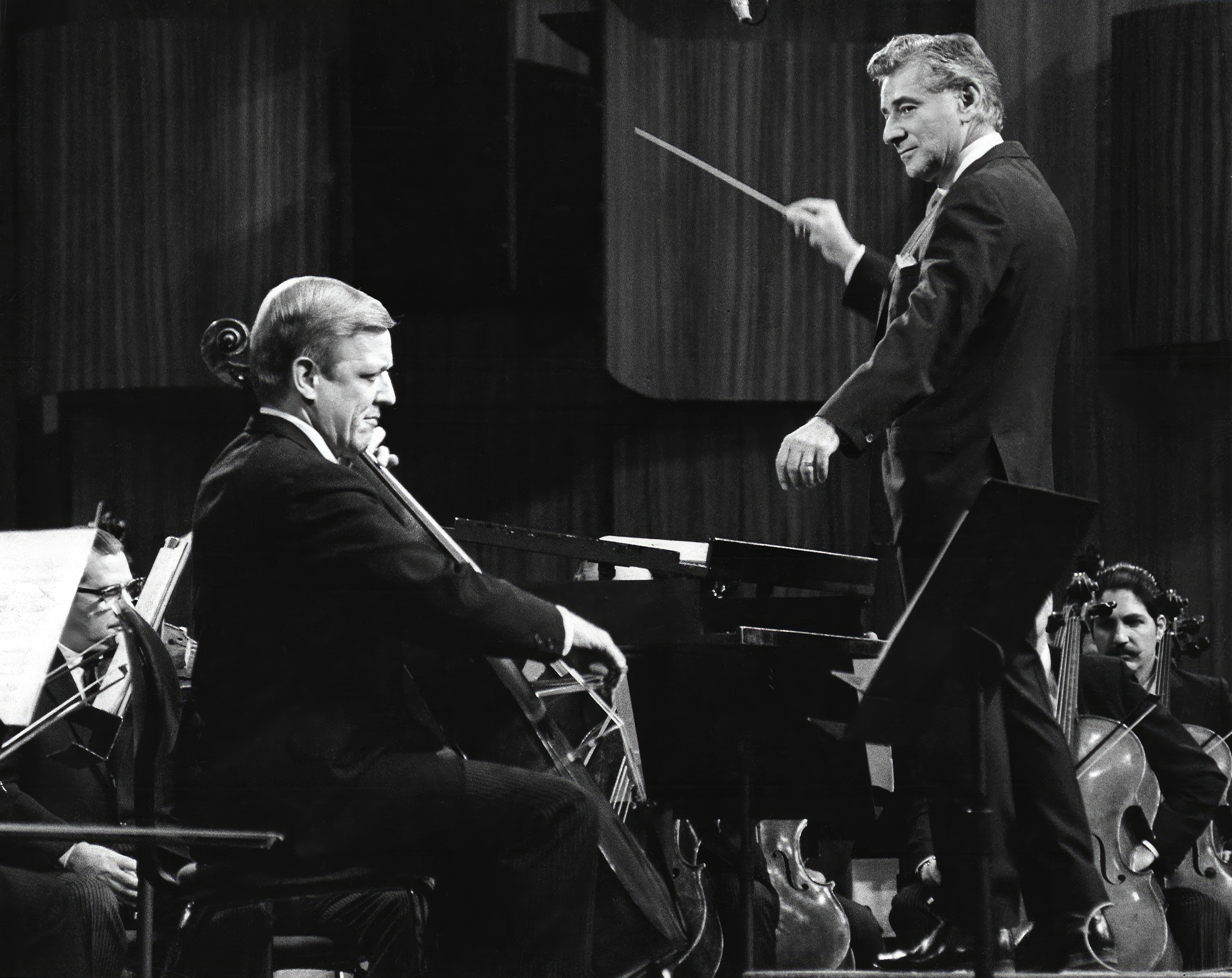
New York Philharmonic principal cellist Lorne Munroe and Leonard Bernstein at the Young People's Concert, December 6, 1968, performing R. Strauss's Don Quixote

In 1953, Canadian conductor Wilfrid Pelletier was appointed conductor of the Young People's Concerts. In Pelletier's final season, 1956-57, the elementary series for younger children was dissolved yet again.

== Leonard Bernstein on CBS (1958–1972) ==
Leonard Bernstein brought the Young People's Concerts to a new level of popular attention as music director of the New York Philharmonic, beginning in 1958. Bernstein wrote, conducted, and narrated a total of 53 episodes from 1958 to 1972, all of which were telecast on CBS and syndicated in over 40 countries. Reaching millions of families across the United States and around the world, these concerts inspired entire generations of musicians and music lovers.

Bernstein's first concert as music director and conductor, on January 18, 1958, at Carnegie Hall in New York, was the first of these programs to be televised, "What Does Music Mean?" In 1962, the Young People's Concerts became the first series of concerts broadcast live from Lincoln Center. Initially broadcast on Saturdays (episodes 1–7) and Sundays (episodes 8–15), the concerts eventually moved to primetime (episodes 16–40) before returning to Sunday afternoons (episodes 41–53).

Although Bernstein left the position of music director in 1969, he continued to lead the Young People's Concerts as conductor emeritus until 1972, concluding in March 1972 with a television series finale devoted to Gustav Holst's The Planets.

The series won five Emmy Awards between 1962 and 1966.

Ep. No.	Title	Original airdate	Featured guests	Music selections
1	What Does Music Mean?	January 18, 1958		William Tell Overture (Rossini); Don Quixote (R. Strauss); Pastoral Symphony (Beethoven); Pictures at an Exhibition (Mussorgsky); Symphony No. 4 (Tchaikovsky); Symphony No. 5 (Tchaikovsky); Six Pieces (Webern); La valse (Ravel)
2	What is American Music?	February 1, 1958	Aaron Copland	An American in Paris (Gershwin); Overture Rip van Winkle (George W. Chadwick); New World Symphony (Dvorâk); Indian Suite (Edward MacDowell); The Dance in Place Congo (Henry F. Gilbert); Ragtime (Stravinsky); Saint Louis Blues (Handy); Rhapsody in Blue (Gershwin); American Festival Overture (William Schuman); Symphony No. 3 (Roy Harris); Symphony No. 2 (Randall Thompson); The Mother of Us All (Virgil Thomson); Music for the Theatre (Copland); Billy the Kid (Copland); Symphony No. 3 (Copland) conducted by Copland
3	What is Orchestration?	March 8, 1958		Capriccio Espagnol (Rimsky-Korsakov); Prelude to the Afternoon of a Faun (Debussy); Rhapsody in Blue (Gershwin); Brandenburg Concerto No. 3 (Bach); Peter and the Wolf (Prokofiev); Kleine Kammermusik (Hindmith); Serenade in B-flat, K. 361 (Mozart); Symphony for Wind Instruments (Stravinsky); "America the Beautiful" (Ward); String Quartet No. 14, Op. 131 (Beethoven); String Quintet (Schubert); Fantasia on a Theme by Thomas Tallis (Vaughn Williams); Symphony for Strings (No. 5) (William Schuman); Sonata per octi toni (Giovanni Gabrieli); "Stars and Stripes" (Sousa); Canon for Percussion (Saul Goodman); Arpeggione Sonata (Schubert); Introduction and Allegro (Ravel);The Soldier's Story (Stravinsky); Boléro (Ravel)
4	What Makes Music Symphonic?	December 13, 1958		Jupiter Symphony, K. 551 (Mozart); Symphony No. 5 (Beethoven); Symphony No. 5 (Sibelius); Symphony No. 4 (Tchaikovsky); "Colonel Bogey March" (Alford); Eroica Symphony (Beethoven); "All Shook Up" (Blackwell/E. Presley); Romeo and Juliet (Tchaikovsky); Rhapsody in Blue (Gershwin); "Frère Jacques"; Symphony No. 2 (Brahms)
5	What is Classical Music?	January 24, 1959		Water Music (Handel); Symphony No. 5 (Beethoven); "I Can't Give You Anything but Love, Baby" (McHugh/Fields); Scheherazade (Rimsky-Korsakov); Piano Concerto No. 21 (Mozart); Brandenburg Concerto No. 4 (Bach); Overture to The Marriage of Figaro (Mozart); "Shave and a haircut"; Symphony No. 102 (Haydn); Fantaisie in F minor (Chopin); Symphony No. 2 (Schumann); Egmont Overture (Beethoven)
6	Humor in Music; See also Humor in Music (1961)	February 28, 1959		The Incredible Flutist (Walter Piston); "Mosquito Dance" from Five Miniatures for Orchestra (Paul White); An American in Paris (Gershwin); Háry János Suite (Kodaly); "La Poule", No. 4 from Nouvelles Suites de Pièces de Clavecin, RCT 6, (Rameau); "Major-General's Song" from The Pirates of Penzance (Gilbert & Sullivan); Symphony No. 88 (Haydn); Classical Symphony (Prokofiev); "Frère Jacques"; Symphony No. 1 (Mahler); "Oh Living! ..." from ""Alone, and yet alive" in The Mikado (Gilbert & Sullivan); Love motif from Tristan und Isolde (Wagner) and its parody in Der Rosenkavalier (R. Strauss); A Musical Joke (Mozart); Polka from the The Golden Age (Shostakovich); Burlesque from Music for the Theater (Copland); bassoon tune from The Sorcerer's Apprentice (Dukas); Symphony No. 4 (Brahms)
7	What is a Concerto?	March 28, 1959	John Corigliano Sr.; John Wummer; William Lincer	Concerto for two Mandolins, Strings and Cembalo in C major (Vivaldi); Brandenburg Concerto No. 5 (Bach); Sinfonia Concertante for Violin, Viola and Orchestra in E♭ major, K.364 (Mozart); Violin Concerto in E minor, Op. 64 (Mendelssohn) Concerto For Orchestra (Bartok)
8	Who is Gustav Mahler?	February 7, 1960	Reri Grist; Helen Raab; William Lewis	Symphony No. 4 in G major; Symphony No 2 in C minor/E♭ major; Symphony No 1 in D major; Des Knaben Wunderhorn; Das Lied von der Erde;
9	Young Performers No. 1	March 6, 1960	Daniel Domb; Kenneth Schermerhorn; Barry Finclair; Stefan B. Mengelberg; Alexandra Wager	Concerto for Cello and Orchestra in B minor, Op. 104 (Dvorak) Concerto for Violin and Orchestra No. 2 in D minor (Wieniawski) Peter and the Wolf (Prokofiev)
10	Unusual Instruments of Present, Past, and Future	March 27, 1960	New York Pro Musica; Noah Greenberg; Vladimir Ussachevsky; Anita Darian	Toccata, "Little Train of Caipira" from Bachianas Brasileiras No 2 (Villa-Lobos); Brandenburg Concerto No. 4 (Bach), Canzon Septimi Toni (G. Gabrieli), Alta (De La Torre) Concerted piece for Tape Recorder and Orchestra (Luening-Ussachevsky) Concerto for a Singing Instrument (Bucci)
11	The Second Hurricane	April 24, 1960	High School of Music & Art	The Second Hurricane (Copland)
12	Overtures and Preludes	January 8, 1961		Semiramide Overture (Rossini); Leonore Overture No. 3 (Beethoven); Prelude to the Afternoon of a Faun (Debussy); Candide Overture (Bernstein)
13	Aaron Copland Birthday Party	February 12, 1961	Aaron Copland; William Warfield	An Outdoor Overture (Copland); Dance from Music for the Theatre (Copland) Grovers Corners Our Town (the Music for Movies arrangement) (Copland); Hoe-down from Rodeo (Copland); Grovers Corners Our Town (the Music for Movies arrangement) Dogmatic from Statements for Orchestra (Copland) Boatmen's Dance and I Bought me a Cat from Old American Songs (Copland) El Salon Mexico (Copland)
14	Young Performers No. 2	March 19, 1961	Lynn Harrell; Elyakum Shapirra; Jung-Ja Kim; Russell Stanger; Veronica Tyler; Gregory Millar; Henry Chapin	Concerto for Cello and Orchestra in B minor, Op. 104 (Dvorak) Concerto for Piano and Orchestra No. 1 in E minor, Op. 11 (Chopin) Mimi's Farewell from La Boheme and Hello, Hello, from The Telephone (Menotti) The Young Person's Guide to the Orchestra (Britten)
15	Folk Music in the Concert Hall	April 9, 1961	Marni Nixon	Symphony No. 39 in E♭ major, K.543 (Mozart) Sinfonia India (Chavez) Songs of the Auvergne (arranged by Canteloube) Symphony No. 2 (Ives)
16	What is Impressionism?	November 23, 1961		Voiles from Piano Preludes, Bk. I; Poissons D'or from Images, Set II; La Puerta del Vino from Preludes, Bk. II; Golliwogg's Cakewalk from Children's Corner; La Mer (Debussy) Daphnis and Chloe, Suite No. 2 (Ravel)
17	The Road to Paris	January 18, 1962	Zara Nelsova	An American in Paris (Gershwin); Schelomo (Bloch) Two Dances from The Three Cornered Hat (de Falla)
18	Happy Birthday, Igor Stravinsky	March 26, 1962		Greeting Prelude (Stravinsky) Petrouchka (Stravinsky)
19	Young Performers No. 3	April 14, 1962	Seiji Ozawa; Gary Karr; Maurice Peress; John Canarina; Ruth & Naomi Segal; Paula Robison; Paul Green; Tony Cirone; David Hopper	Overture to The Marriage of Figaro (Mozart) Prayer (Bloch-Antonini) Fantasy on a Theme from the Opera "Moses in Egypt" by Rossini (Paganini-Reinshagen, transcribed for orchestra by Gary Karr) The Carnival of the Animals (Saint Saens)
20	The Sound of a Hall	November 21, 1962	Shirley Verrett; John Corigliano, Sr.; Frank Gullino; Joseph Bernstein; William Dembinsky	The Roman Carnival Overture (Berlioz) The Little Horses from Old American Songs (Copland) Concerto for Four Violins and String Orchestra Op. 3, No. 10 (Vivaldi) Tango Pasodoble from Facade (Walton) 1812 Overture (Tchaikovsky)
21	What is a Melody?	December 21, 1962		Prelude to Tristan and Isolde (Wagner); Symphony No. 40 in G minor, K.550 (Mozart); Concerto Music for Strings and Brass, Op. 50 (Hindemith); Symphony No. 4 in E minor, Op. 98 (Brahms).
22	Young Performers No. 4	January 15, 1963	Joan Weiner; Yuri Krasnopolsky; Claudia Hoca; Zoltán Rozsnyai; Pamela Paul; Serge Fournier; André Watts	Piano Concerto in A major, K.488 (Mozart) and Piano Concerto No. 1 in E♭ major (Liszt)
23	The Latin American Spirit	March 8, 1963	Netania Davrath	Batuque (Fernandez); Bachianas Brasileiras Nn 5 (Villa-Labos) Sensemaya (Revueltas); Danzon Cubano (Copland); Symphonic Dances from West Side Story (Bernstein)
24	A Tribute to Teachers	29 November 1963		Prelude to Khovantschina (Mussorgsky); Symphony No. 2 in E minor (Randall Thompson); Suite from the Incredible Flutist (Walter Piston); Academic Festival Overture, Op. 80 (Brahms).
25	Young Performers No. 5	December 23, 1963	Heidi Lehwalder; Amos Eisenberg; Weldon Berry, Jr.; Claudio Abbado; Shulamit Ran; Pedro Calderon; Stephen E. Kates; Zdeněk Košler	Concerto for Harp and Orchestra in B♭ major, Op. 4, No. 6 (Handel) Introduction and Allegro for Harp, Flute, Clarinet and Strings (Ravel) Cappriccio for Piano and Orchestra (Shulamith Ran) Rhapsody No. 1 (arranged for cello and orchestra) (Bartok) William Tell Overture (Rossini)
26	The Genius of Paul Hindemith	February 23, 1964		String Quartet No. 1; Kleine Kammermusik, Op. 24, No. 2; Mathis der Maler (Hindemith)
27	Jazz in the Concert Hall	March 11, 1964	Richard Davis, Don Ellis, Benny Golson, Eric Dolphy, Joseph Cocuzzo, Gunther Schuller; Aaron Copland	Journey into Jazz (Gunther Schuller, Script by Nat Hentoff) Concerto for Piano and Orchestra (Copland) Improvisations for Orchestra and Jazz Soloists (Larry Austin).
28	What is Sonata Form?	November 6, 1964	Veronica Tyler	Jupiter Symphony in C major, K.551 (Mozart); Micaela's Aria from Carmen (Bizet) Piano Sonata in C major, K.545 (Mozart); Classical Symphony (Prokofiev)
29	Farewell to Nationalism	November 30, 1964	Seymour Lipkin	Prelude to Die Meistersinger (Wagner); Mazurka in B♭ major (Chopin); Sempre Libera from La Traviata (Verdi); Symphony no. 4 in F minor, Op. 36 (Tchaikovsky); Sonata for Flute and Harpsichord in G minor (Bach) Concerto for Flute, Bassoon, Violin and Bass No. 41 in G minor (Vivaldi); Hungarian Rhapsody No. 2 (Liszt); Five Pieces for Orchestra Op. 10, No. 1 (Webern); Pieces for Prepared Piano And String Quartet (Mayuzumi); Composition for Twelve Instruments (Babbitt); Incontri fuer 24. Instrumente (Nono); Battle Hymn of the Republic (Steffe); Yankee Doodle; The Moldau (Smetana); Suite No. 1 (De Falla); Fourth of July (Ives); Russian Sailor's Dance (Gliere); Columbia, The Gem of the Ocean (Beckett).
30	Young Performers No. 6	January 28, 1965	Patricia Michaelian; James Buswell IV	Piano Concerto No. 20 in D minor, K.466 (Mozart); Violin Concerto in E minor, Op. 64 (Mendelssohn) Mother Goose Suite (Ravel)
31	A Tribute to Sibelius	February 19, 1965	Sergiu Luca	Finlandia; Violin Concerto in D minor, Op. 47 Symphony No. 2 in D major, Op. 43 (Sibelius)
32	Musical Atoms: A Study of Intervals	November 29, 1965		Prelude to Act III of Lohengrin (Wagner); The Blue Danube (Strauss); Help (John-McCartney); Symphony No. 4 in E minor, Op. 98 (Brahms); Symphony No. 4 in F minor (Vaughan Williams)
33	The Sound of an Orchestra	December 14, 1965		Symphony No. 88 in G major (Haydn); Symphony No. 5 in C minor, Op. 67 (Beethoven); Symphony No. 1 in C minor, Op. 68 (Brahms); Iberia (Debussy); The Royal March from L'Histoire du Soldat (Stravinsky); An American in Paris (Gershwin); Hoedown from Rodeo (Copland).
34	A Birthday Tribute to Shostakovich	January 5, 1966		Leningrad Symphony in C major, Op. 60 (Shostakovich) Symphony No. 9 in D minor, Op. 125 (Beethoven)
35	Young Performers No. 7	February 22, 1966	Paul Schoenfield; Stephanie Sebastian; David Oei; Horacio Gutiérrez; James DePreist; Jacques Houtmann; Edo de Waart	Pictures at an Exhibition (original piano version) and (orchestrated by Ravel) (Mussorgsky)
36	What Is a Mode?	November 23, 1966		Fetes from Nocturnes (Debussy) Scheherazade (Rimsky-Korsakov) Symphony No. 4 in E minor, Op. 98 (Brahms); Symphony No. 6 in D minor, Op. 104 (Sibelius); the Sunken Cathedral from Preludes (Debussy); Symphony No. 5 in C minor, Op. 67 (Beethoven) Fancy Free (Bernstein);
37	Young Performers No. 8	January 27, 1967	Elmar Oliveira; Mark Salkind; Fred Alston; Donald Green; Juan Pablo Izquierdo; Sylvia Caduff; Stephen Dominko; George Reid; Young Uck Kim	Sinfonia Concertante in B♭ major (Haydn) Accordion arrangement of Piano Concerto no. 2 in F minor, Op. 21 (Chopin) Diesen heil'gen Halle from The Magic Flute (Mozart) Violin Concerto No. 3 in B minor, Op. 61 (Saint Saens)
38	Charles Ives: American Pioneer	February 23, 1967	Simon Estes	The Gong on the Hook and the Ladder (Fireman's Parade on Main Street); Washington's Birthday from Holidays Symphony; The Circus Band-Parade (arranged by Harold Farberman); Lincoln, the Great Commoner the Unanswered Question
39	Alumni Reunion	April 19, 1967	Stephen E. Kates; Veronica Tyler; André Watts	Variations on a Rococo Theme, Op. 33 (Tchaikovsky) Mi chiamano Mimi from La Boheme (Puccini) and My Man's Gone Now from Porgy and Bess (Gershwin) Piano Concerto No. 2 in B♭ major, Op. 83 (Brahms)
40	A Toast to Vienna in 3/4 Time	December 25, 1967	Christa Ludwig; Walter Berry	Wiener Blut (J. Strauss); German Dance No. 3, K.605 and Jupiter Symphony in C major, K.551 (Mozart); Symphony No. 7 in A major, op. 92 (Beethoven); Das Knaben Wunderhorn (Mahler) Waltzes from Der Rosenkavalier (R. Strauss).
41	Forever Beethoven	January 28, 1968	Joseph Kalichstein; Paul Capolongo	Symphony No. 5 in C minor, Op. 67: Piano Concerto No. 4 in G major, op. 58 Leonore Overture No. 3 (Beethoven)
42	Young Performers No. 9	March 31, 1968	Lawrence Foster (cello); Martin and Steven Vann (piano); Alois Springer and Helen Quach (guest conductors)	Cello Concerto No. 1 in A minor (Saint-Saëns); Symphonic Metamorphosis of Themes by Carl Maria von Weber (Hindemith); original Weber pieces
43	Quiz-Concert: How Musical Are You?	May 26, 1968		Overture to The Marriage of Figaro (Mozart); Classical Symphony (Prokofiev); Capriccio Espagnol (Rimsky-Korsakov); Symphony No. 1 in C minor, Op. 68 (Brahms).
44	Fantastic Variations	December 25, 1968	Lorne Munroe	Don Quixote (R. Strauss)
45	Bach Transmogrified	April 27, 1969	Michael Korn; Leopold Stokowski; Moog synthesizer; David Nadien; Julius Baker; New York Rock & Roll Ensemble	Little Organ Fugue in G minor (J. S. Bach): original version; transcription for orchestra (L. Stokowski); Moog synthesizer version (Albert Seer); Violin Partita in E major (J. S. Bach) Phorion (Lukas Foss)
46	Berlioz Takes a Trip	May 25, 1969		Symphonie Fantastique (Berlioz)
47	Two Ballet Birds	14 September 1969		Swan Lake (Tchaikovsky) and Firebird Suite (Stravinsky)
48	Fidelio: A Celebration of Life	March 29, 1970	Forest Warren; Anita Darian; Howard Ross; David Cumberland	Fidelio (Beethoven)
49	The Anatomy of a Symphony Orchestra	May 24, 1970		Pini di Roma (Respighi)
50	A Copland Celebration	December 27, 1970	Stanley Drucker	Concerto for Clarinet and String Orchestra (abridged version) Suite from Billy the Kid (Copland)
51	Thus Spake Richard Strauss	April 4, 1971		Also Sprach Zarathustra (R. Strauss)
52	Liszt and the Devil	February 13, 1972		Faust Symphony (Liszt)
53	Holst: The Planets	March 26, 1972		The Planets (Holst)

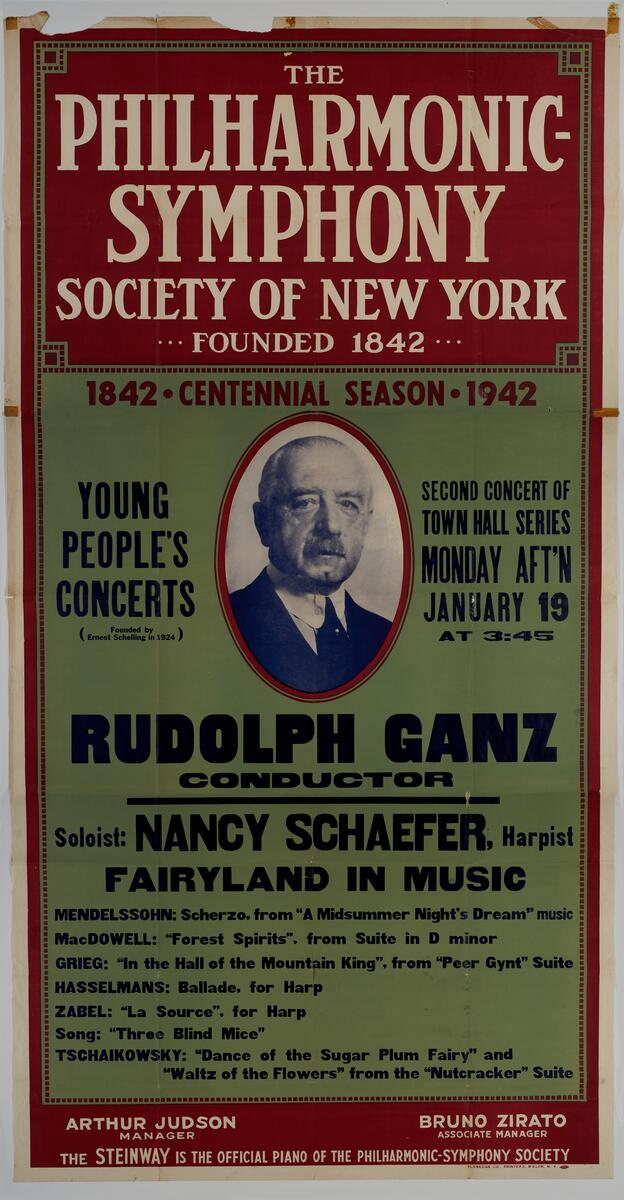
Poster for New York Philharmonic Young People's Concert, conductor Rudolf Ganz, January 19, 1942

Kultur International Films released Volume I on DVD in 2004 and Volume II on DVD in 2013. Each volume contains more than twenty hours of concerts.

== International stage (1972–present) ==
Following their international rise to fame in the Bernstein era, the Young People's Concerts were subsequently presented by the New York Philharmonic on tour in concert halls throughout the world. The series began to expand its artistic leadership to develop a collective vision for its future.

Following Bernstein's final Young People's Concert in 1972, Michael Tilson Thomas regularly led the series (1971–77), in addition to conductors such as Erich Leinsdorf, Pierre Boulez, Igor Buketoff, Zubin Mehta, Aaron Copland, Kurt Masur, Leonard Slatkin, André Previn, Thomas Wilkins, and Jaap van Zweden.

In 2008, the New York Philharmonic was presenting four Young People's Concerts each season, in addition to concerts on tour to cities like Hong Kong. American conductor Delta David Gier hosted and led the programs and playwright Tom Dulack scripted them, which were themed as a unit and, as Schelling pioneered decades earlier, the live performances were complemented by live images projected on a large screen.

As of 2024, the New York Philharmonic continues to present four Young People's Concerts each season. The contemporary concerts are thematically programmed, focusing on 21st century issues like climate change, immigration, and social justice. The performances are complemented by live image and video projections, guest actors, dancers, singers, and community partners, with an interdisciplinary approach that brings elements like science, fantasy, and hip hop into the orchestra. These concerts have been streamed online for international audiences.

== Legacy and other educational programs ==
In 2005, the New York Philharmonic revived their "Elementary" series, renamed the Very Young People's Concerts, which is designed for younger children ages 3 to 6. The 30-minute concerts, hosted by the philharmonic's associate principal violist Rebecca Young, introduce children to music through games, stories, and musical performances of chamber music. They also give children the opportunity to play musical instruments.

Towards the end of the 2022 film Tár, the film's conductor protagonist is seen in her childhood home watching a VHS tape of the first episode, "What Does Music Mean?".
