= Caduff =

Caduff is a Swiss surname, frequent in Grisons. Notable people with the surname include:

- Fabio Caduff (born 1985), Swiss snowboarder
- Giacun Caduff (born 1979), Swiss film director and producer
- Sylvia Caduff (born 1937), Swiss orchestral conductor
