= New Year's Eve Concert 1992: Richard Strauss Gala =

1992 German TV music event

- Kultur Video DVD, D4209
- Genre: Classical music
- Directed by: Barrie Gavin
- Starring: Claudio Abbado; Martha Argerich; Kathleen Battle; Renée Fleming; Andreas Schmidt; Frederica von Stade
- Country of origin: Germany
- Original language: German

Production
- Executive producer: Peter Gelb
- Producers: Joachim Augustin; Thomas Frost; David Mottley
- Editor: Joachim Meissner
- Running time: 76 minutes
- Production companies: CAMI Video and ZDF

Original release
- Network: ZDF, La Sept, NHK and PBS
- Release: 31 December 1992

New Year's Eve Concert 1992: Richard Strauss Gala was a 76-minute televised event presented in Berlin's Philharmonie on 31 December 1992, in which four pieces of music by Richard Strauss were performed by the pianist Martha Argerich and the singers Kathleen Battle, Renée Fleming, Andreas Schmidt and Frederica von Stade with the Berlin Philharmonic Orchestra under the direction of Claudio Abbado. It was jointly produced by Columbia Artists Management and Germany's Zweites Deutsches Fernsehen in association with France's La Sept, Japan's NHK and the United States' PBS, and was released on CD and Laserdisc by Sony Classical Records and on DVD by Kultur Video.

== Background ==
Don Juan is a symphonic poem for large orchestra that Strauss composed in 1888 at the age of twenty-four. One of Strauss's several essays in programme music, it offers a musical analogue of the text of Don Juans Ende, an unfinished play written by Nikolaus Lenau in 1844 shortly before he was overwhelmed by mental illness and confined to an asylum. Lenau in turn drew on a Don Juan tradition dating back to the Spain of the Renaissance era. Strauss conducted the first performance of his work on 11 November 1889 in Weimar, where he held the post of Kapellmeister. The success of the piece gained him international fame as an exponent of modernism.

Strauss composed his Burleske (meaning "farce" or "mockery") for piano and orchestra in 1885-1886, when he was twenty-one. He wrote it for the pianist, conductor and composer Hans von Bülow, but von Bülow thought it a "complicated piece of nonsense" and judged its piano part to be impracticably difficult. Strauss set the piece aside after the discouraging experience of a rehearsal with the Meiningen Orchestra in which he both played the piano and conducted. In 1889, Strauss showed his score to the Scottish-born pianist and composer Eugene d'Albert, who liked it well enough to urge Strauss to try to improve it. D'Albert premiered a revised version of the work, now dedicated to him, on 21 June 1890. Strauss always remained ambivalent about the piece, programming it in concerts with increasing frequency as the years went by but never granting it the honour of an opus number.

The symphonic poem Till Eulenspiegel's Merry Pranks was composed in 1894-1895. Till Eulenspiegel ("Owl-mirror") was the protagonist of an anonymous German chapbook published in 1515. A scatological comedy, the book narrates a series of misadventures encountered by Eulenspiegel as he travels around the Holy Roman Empire playing practical jokes on various fools, hypocrites and figures of authority. Strauss's score depicts Eulenspiegel riding his horse, vandalizing a market, mocking the clergy, flirting with girls, ridiculing scholars and surviving an attempted hanging for blasphemy.

Der Rosenkavalier, Strauss's opera of 1911, tells the story of how Octavian, the young Count Rofrano, transfers his affections from his aristocratic married mistress (the Marschallin) to a bourgeois ingénue (Sophie von Faninal). The drama's final scene comprises a trio ("Marie Theres'...") in which the Marschallin reconciles herself to Octavian's turning away from her and a duet ("Ist ein Traum") in which Octavian and Sophie rejoice in their newly kindled love.

== DVD chapter listing ==
Richard Georg Strauss (1864-1949)

- 1 (2:30) Opening credits, incorporating footage of some of Berlin's tourist attractions
- 2 (18:23) Don Juan: Tondichtung nach Nikolaus Lenau ("Don Juan, tone-poem after Nikolaus Lenau", Op. 20, Weimar, 1889), with Tōru Yasunaga (solo violin)
- 3 (21:14) Burleske für Klavier und Orchester d-moll ("Burlesque for piano and orchestra in D minor", Eisenach, 1890), with Martha Argerich (piano)
- 4 (17:31) Till Eulenspiegels lustige Streiche, nach alter Schelmenweise, in Rondeau form ("Till Owlmirror's merry pranks, after an old picaresque legend, in rondo form", Op. 28, Cologne, 1895)
- 5 (14:58) Der Rosenkavalier ("The knight of the rose", Op. 59, Dresden, 1911), with a libretto by Hugo von Hofmannsthal (1874-1929) after Les amours du chevalier de Faubles by Jean-Baptiste Louvet de Couvrai (1760-1797) and Monsieur de Pourceaugnac (1669) by Molière (1622-1673). Act 3: trio and finale: "Marie Theres'... Ist ein Traum", with Kathleen Battle (soprano, Sophie), Renée Fleming (soprano, Marschallin), Andreas Schmidt (baritone, Herr von Faninal) and Frederica von Stade (mezzo-soprano, Octavian)
- 6 (2:14) Closing credits

== CD track listing ==
- 1 (16:41) Don Juan
- 2 (18:45) Burleske für Klavier und Orchester d-moll
- 3 (14:30) Till Eulenspiegels lusitige Streiche
- 4 (12:41) Der Rosenkavalier: Act 3: trio and finale

== Personnel ==
=== Artists ===
- Martha Argerich (b. 1941), piano
- Kathleen Battle (b. 1948), soprano
- Renée Fleming (b. 1959), soprano
- Andreas Schmidt (b. 1960), bass-baritone
- Frederica von Stade (b. 1945), mezzo-soprano
- Tōru Yasunaga (b. 1951), violin
- Berlin Philharmonic Orchestra
- Claudio Abbado (1933-2014), conductor

=== Broadcast personnel ===
- Peter Gelb (b. 1953), executive producer
- Barrie Gavin (b. 1935), director
- Joachim Augustin, producer and audio supervisor
- Thomas Frost, audio producer
- David Mottley, audio producer
- Peter Ruppenthal, production manager
- Daniel Anker, associate producer
- Anne Cauvin, associate producer
- Laura Mitgang, associate producer
- Kurt-Oskar Herting, lighting director
- Rotraut Arnold, assistant to the director
- Ursula Veit, vision mixer
- Britta Lindermann, stage manager
- Alfred Schrandt, stage manager
- Joachim Meissner, videotape editor
- Walter Voges, gaffer
- Michael Butz, camera operator
- Andreas Heller, camera operator
- Jorg Hofmann, camera operator
- Rudi Junge, camera operator
- Axel Leist, camera operator
- Gabriele Leist, camera operator
- Hartmut Wilhelm, camera operator
- Gerion Wirthensohn, camera operator
- Wolfgang Becker, additional camera operator
- Gary Bradley, opening title sequence
- Pat Jaffe, opening title sequence
- Arne Ohlendorf, engineer-in-charge
- Walter Wagner, video engineer
- Friedbert Lorenz, video engineer
- Karlfried Pflug, videotape operator
- Sid McLauchlan, sound engineer
- Pauline Heister, sound engineer
- Sebastian Munchmeyer, audio engineer
- Reinhard Reiser, audio engineer
- Timothy Wood, audio engineer

== Critical reception ==
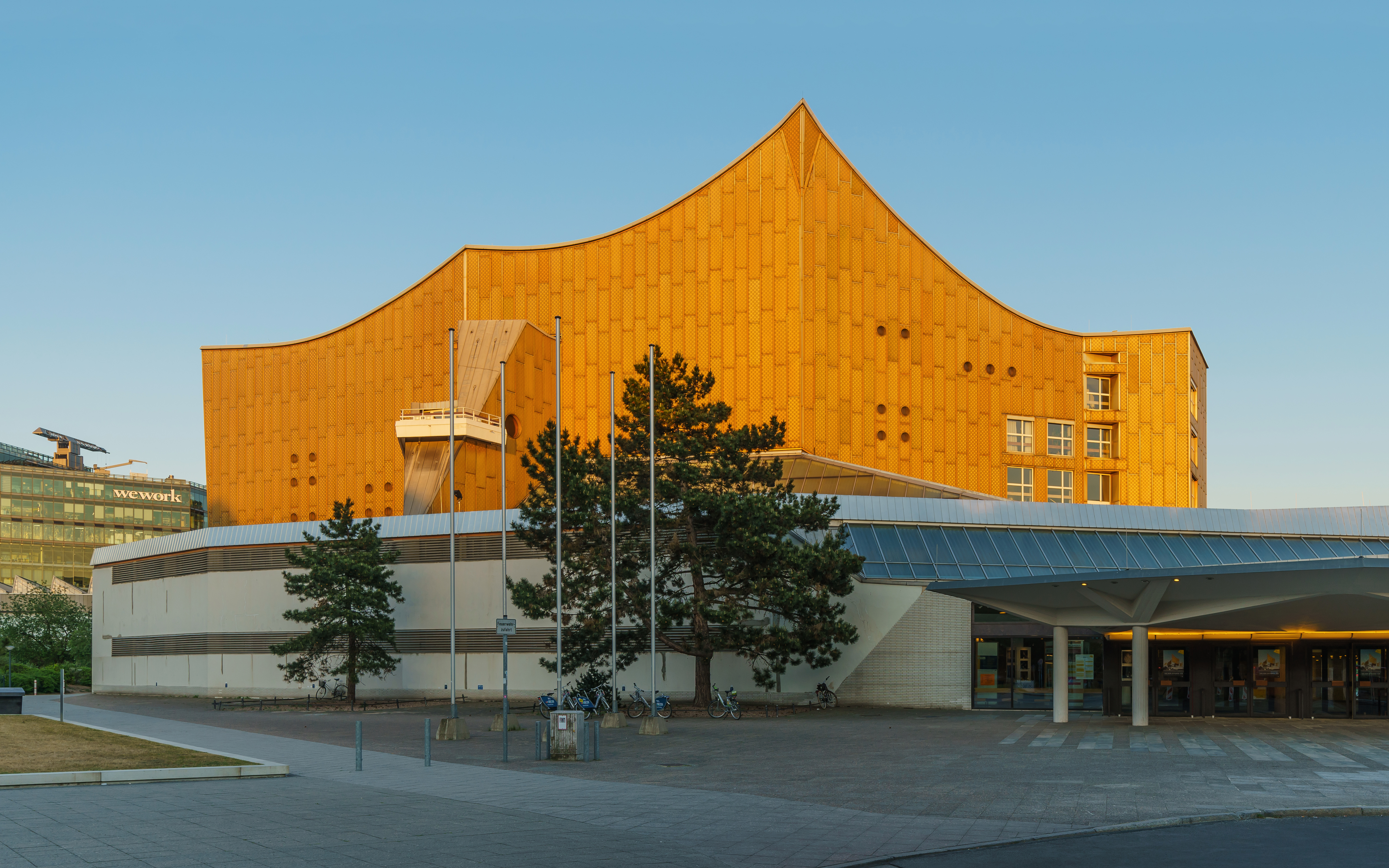
The Berliner Philharmonie

Alan Blyth reviewed the gala on CD in Gramophone in July 1993. "I found this a distressing experience", he wrote. Even the Berlin Philharmonic under Herbert von Karajan could rarely have played the items selected by Claudio Abbado with such remarkable virtuosity, but "that is the trouble: the music is played for that and little else". The album presented Richard Strauss as the "vulgar" composer that his critics alleged him to be. Don Juan and Till Eulenspiegel were portrayed with refulgent strings and belligerent brass that were impressive but alien to Strauss's essential musical personality. Clemens Krauss and Rudolf Kempe had found delight and humour in Strauss's pictures of this pair of rascals; Abbado had not, instead hammering his audience into a feeling of "awesome submission".

Burleske fared better in Abbado's hands than the tone-poems. He eschewed heavy-handedness in favour of at least a modicum of gentleness, and Martha Argerich projected some mischievous wit as well as overcoming the famous difficulties of Strauss's piano writing with her equally famous technical brilliance. There were passages which she approached with a "fearsome attack" that was hyperbolic, but her cadenzas were very enjoyable.

In the trio from Der Rosenkavalier, Abbado was "intent on ferocious power at the expense of radiance". The quality of Renée Fleming's tone promised that her Marschallin was on the verge of becoming exceptional, but Frederica von Stade had lost the freshness with which she had formerly endowed Octavian, and Kathleen Battle seemed to find Sophie's highest notes in both the trio and the subsequent duet uncomfortably stressful. The three American ladies sang without the "inner warmth and understanding" that some of their German and Austrian predecessors had brought to their roles, but did at least deliver the trio with "accuracy and flair".

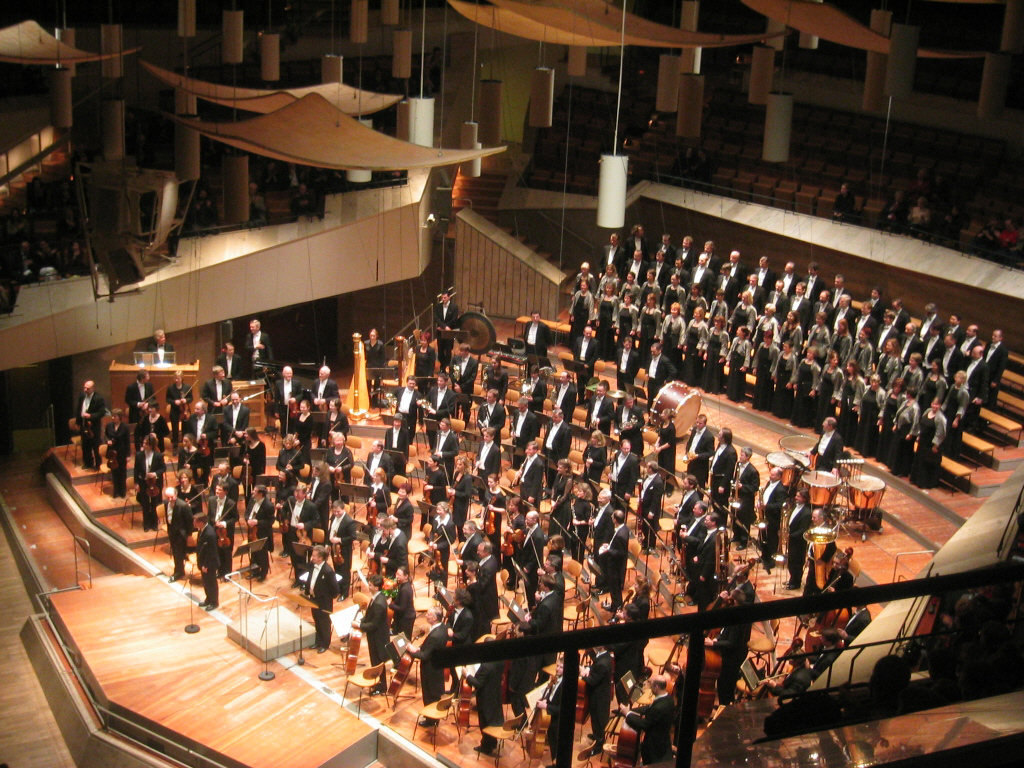
The Berliner Philharmonie's Großer Saal (main auditorium)

Sony's audio engineering emphasized the excesses of Abbado's interpretations. Although the CD was described as a live recording, it provided no evidence of the presence of the Philharmonie's audience until their applause at its very end. Indeed, the listening Berliners were so unobtrusive that one could not but help wondering whether any of the music had been re-recorded after they had gone home - it was difficult to imagine Argerich's pianism failing to elicit an ovation. The notes in Sony's insert booklet, written in humorous vein as though by Strauss himself, were "both facetious and faintly offensive". In sum, the CD was "not a happy issue".

The gala was also reviewed in Classic CD and Hi-Fi News, and was additionally discussed in The New York Times, Tim Ashley's Richard Strauss (1999), Frithjof Hager's Claudio Abbado: die Anderen in der Stille hören (2000), Ulrich Eckhardt's Claudio Abbado: Dirigent (2003) and Matthew Rye's 1001 classical recordings you must hear before you die (2017).

== Home media history ==
In 1993, Sony Classical Records issued the gala on a 62-minute golden CD (catalogue number SK-52565) accompanied by a 20-page booklet including five production photographs by Vivianne Purdom and notes by Andreas Kluge in English, French, German and Italian. The disc was derived from a digital recording made with 20-bit technology. Sony also issued the gala on a CLV (constant linear velocity) Laserdisc (catalogue number SLV-53344) with 4:3 NTSC colour video and CD-quality stereo audio. In 2007, Kultur Video released the gala on a 76-minute DVD (catalogue number D4209). Kultur's DVD offers the same 4:3 NTSC colour video as Sony's Laserdisc but provides its stereo audio only in the compressed Dolby Digital format.

== Gallery of personnel ==
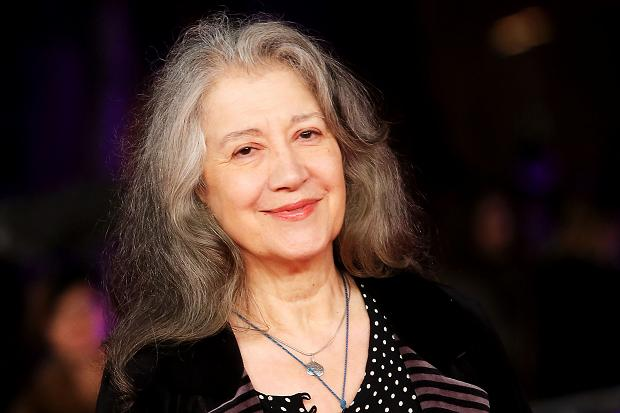
Martha Argerich

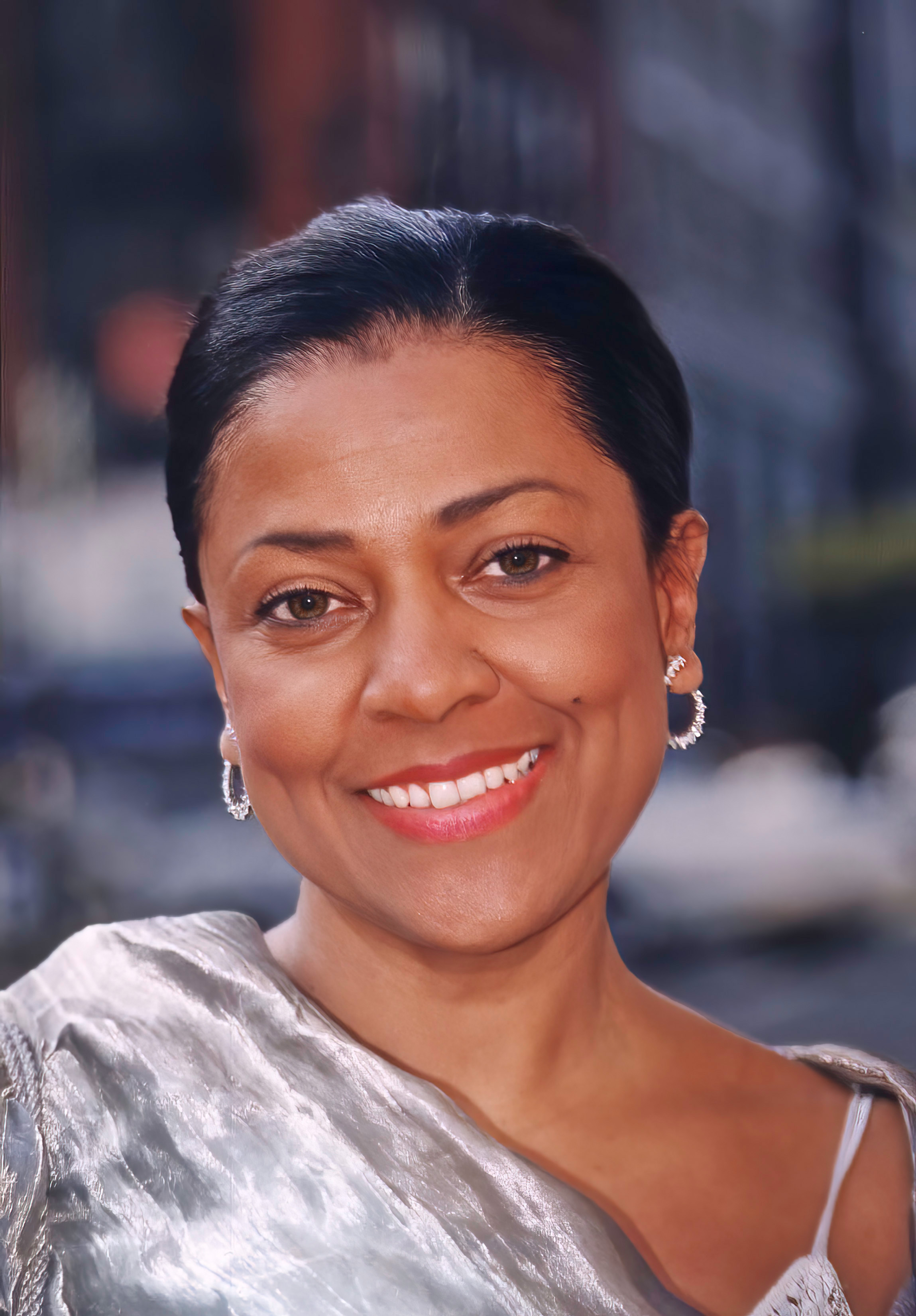
Kathleen Battle

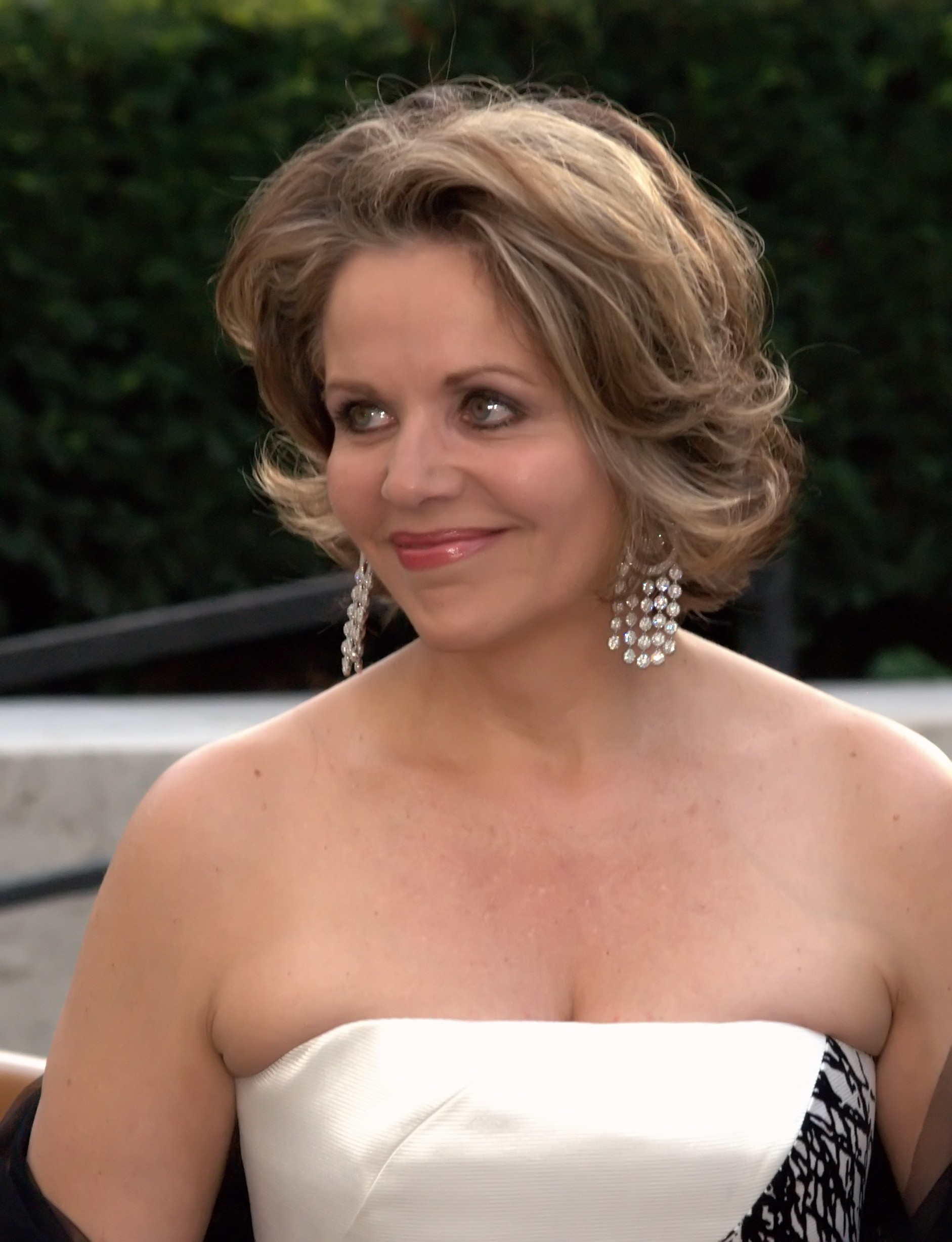
Renée Fleming

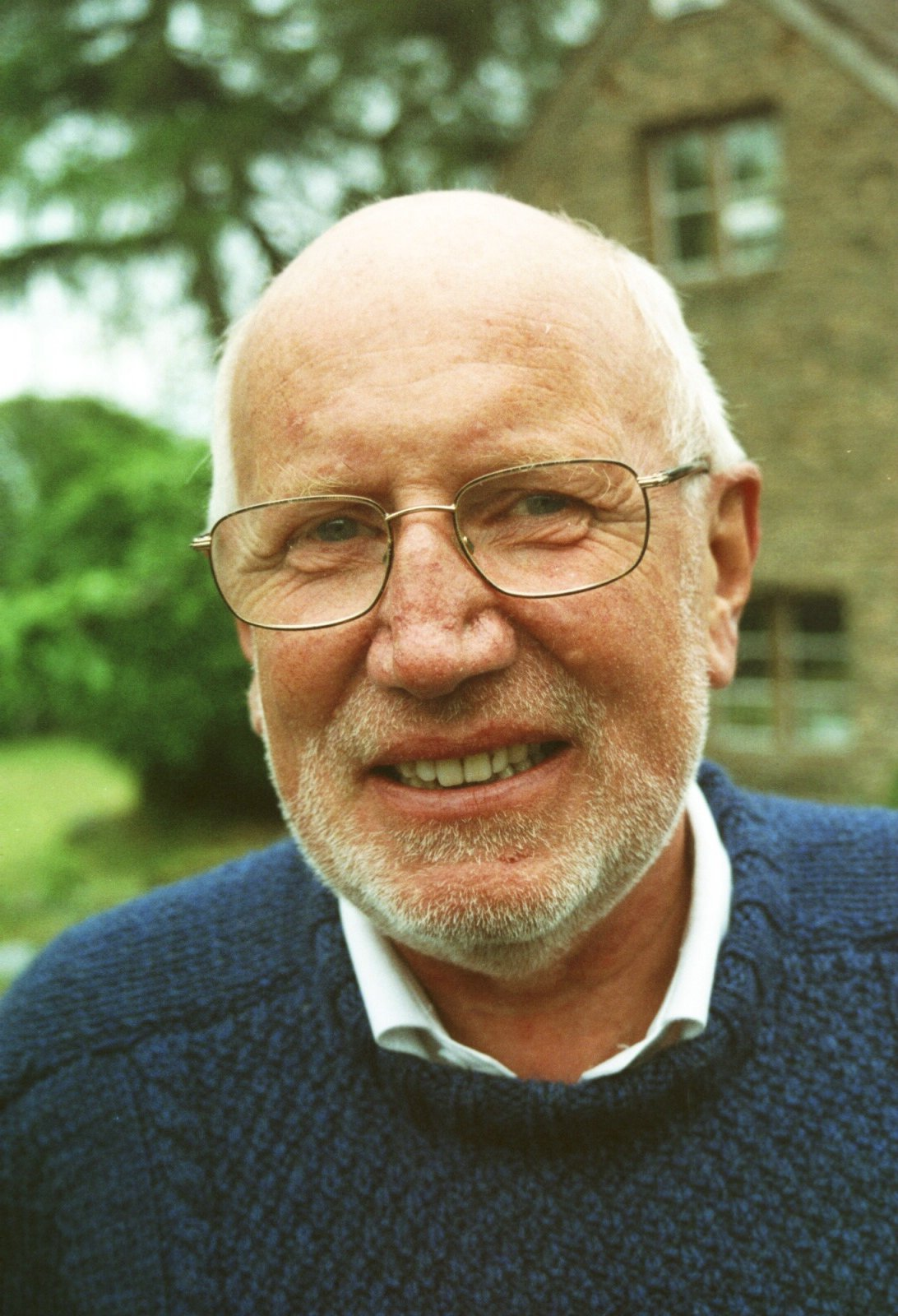
Barrie Gavin

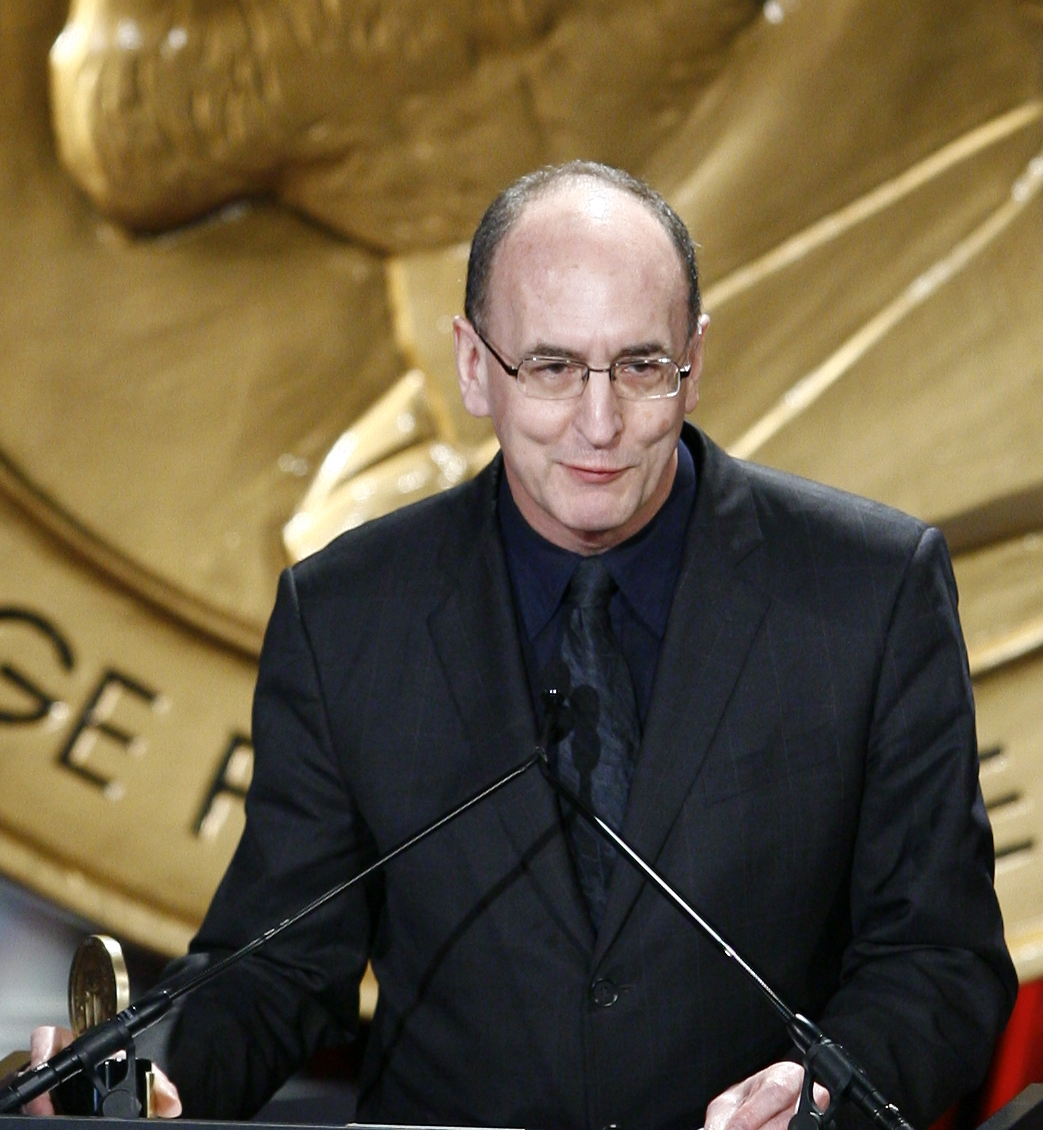
Peter Gelb

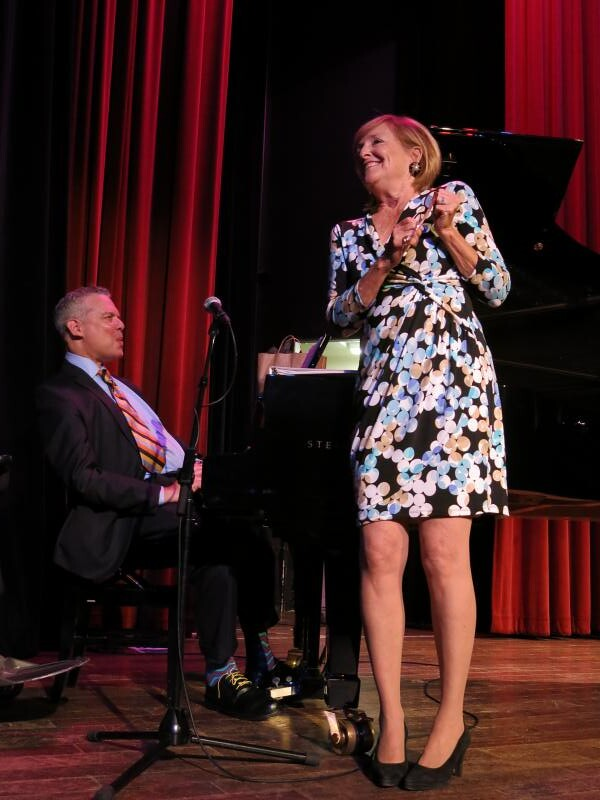
Frederica von Stade
