= Burleske =

Composition by Richard Strauss

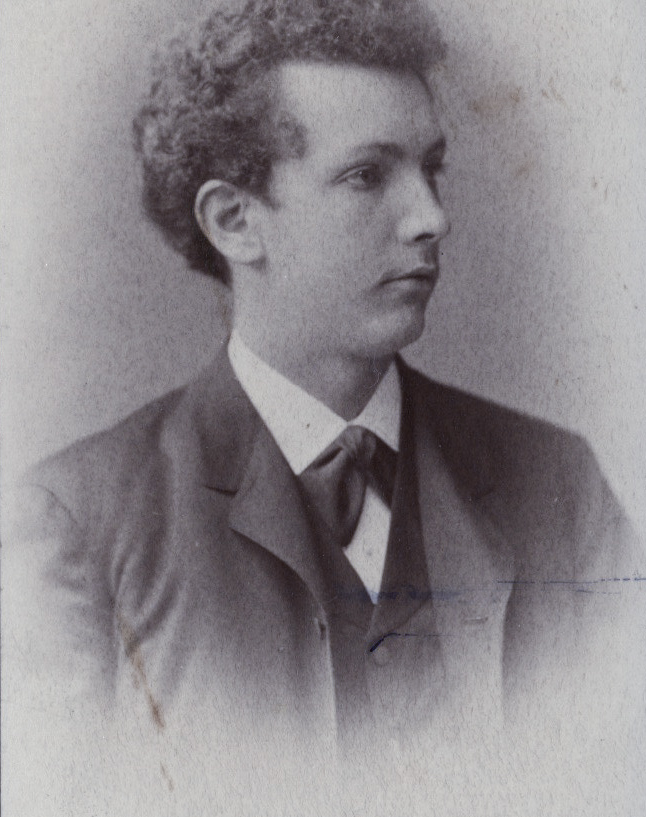
Richard Strauss in 1886

The Burleske in D minor is a composition for piano and orchestra written by Richard Strauss in 1885–86, when he was 21.

== Background ==
=== Original title and dedication ===
The work's original title was Scherzo in D minor, and it was written for Hans von Bülow, who had appointed Strauss assistant conductor of the Meiningen Court Orchestra. However, von Bülow considered it a "complicated piece of nonsense" and refused to learn it. He said the piano part was "Lisztian" and "unplayable", particularly for a pianist with a small handspan (Strauss says that von Bülow could barely reach an octave). Strauss rehearsed the work with the Meiningen Orchestra, conducting and playing the solo part himself, but then set it aside. He wrote to von Bülow: "[G]iven an outstanding (!) pianist, and a first-rate (!) conductor, perhaps the whole thing will not turn out to be the unalloyed nonsense I took it for after the first rehearsal. After the first run-through, I was totally discouraged."

=== Renaming, rededication and premiere ===
In 1889, Strauss became acquainted with Eugen d'Albert, who liked the work, although he suggested some cuts and changes to the piano part. Strauss rededicated the revised work to d'Albert, who premiered it under its new title Burleske, at a convention of the General German Music Association at Eisenach on 21 June 1890, in the same concert as the premiere of Strauss's Death and Transfiguration. The word "Burleske" translates as "farce" or "mockery".

=== Reaction ===
Bülow was still not impressed. In a letter to Johannes Brahms in January 1891, he wrote: "Strauss's Burleske decidedly has some genius in it, but in other respects it is horrifying." Despite this, he conducted the work that month in Berlin, with Eugen d'Albert as soloist.

Strauss was offered a handsome sum by a publisher for the rights to the work, but he was still not convinced of its merits, so he declined. He was likely influenced in his own opinion of the work by Bülow's opinion of it. A quarter of a century later he wrote about Bülow: "For anyone who ever heard him play Beethoven or conduct Wagner, who attended one of his piano lessons or observed him in orchestra rehearsal, he inevitably became the model of all the shining virtues of a performing artist, and his touching sympathy for me, his influence on the development of my artistic abilities, were the decisive factors in my career."

== Publication ==
In 1894, Strauss agreed to publication of the Burleske, although it took him a long time to regard it with great favour. It eventually became one of his favourite works, and he programmed it in his last concert in London with the Philharmonia Orchestra in September 1947, along with Don Juan, the Symphonia Domestica and the waltzes from Der Rosenkavalier.

Strauss never allocated an opus number to the work, but the opus number 11 has often come to be associated with it, although Strauss gave that number to his Horn Concerto No. 1 in E♭. It appears as number 85 in the catalogue by Erich Herrmann Mueller von Asow, and number 145 in that by Franz Trenner (see List of compositions by Richard Strauss#Other works).

== Other premieres ==
The first performance of the Burleske in the United States was by Heinrich Gebhard with the Boston Symphony Orchestra, under Wilhelm Gericke, in April 1903. The first performance in Australia was by Vera Bradford in 1937, with the Melbourne Symphony Orchestra conducted by Georg Schnéevoigt. Schnéevoigt considered the piano part manageable only by a male pianist, and demanded Vera Bradford be replaced; but she stood her ground and gave a celebrated performance.

== Structure and scoring ==
The piece starts with a theme introduced on timpani and answered by the orchestra. The piano then enters in a state of high excitement. A second, more lyrical Brahmsian theme emerges, followed by waltz-like measures not unlike the waltzes from Der Rosenkavalier. The work ends quietly, again on the timpani. It takes about 20 minutes to perform.

The piece is scored for piano solo and an orchestra of piccolo, 2 flutes, 2 oboes, 2 clarinets in B♭, 2 bassoons, 4 horns (2 in F, 2 in D), 2 trumpets, timpani, and strings.

== Notable performers ==
Burleske
Performed by Neal O'Doan with the Seattle Philharmonic Orchestra

Notable performers who have played or recorded the Burleske include Martha Argerich, Claudio Arrau, Emanuel Ax, Wilhelm Backhaus, Maurizio Baglini, Rudolf Buchbinder, Michel Dalberto, Barry Douglas, Malcolm Frager, Nelson Freire, Glenn Gould, Hélène Grimaud, Friedrich Gulda, Marc-André Hamelin, Byron Janis, Jeffrey Kahane, Alexander Lonquich, Elly Ney (1932), Sviatoslav Richter, Martin Roscoe, Rudolf Serkin, Jascha Spivakovsky (with Strauss himself conducting), Sara Davis Buechner, Jean-Yves Thibaudet and Bertrand Chamayou (2021). There is a recording of Strauss himself conducting the Philharmonia at the Royal Albert Hall London, 19 October 1947, with Alfred Blumen on the piano (this was the last concert he ever conducted).

In 2001, the music was used for the ballet Burleske, choreographed for the New York City Ballet by Peter Martins.

== Discography ==
- Martha Argerich and the Berlin Philharmonic Orchestra conducted by Claudio Abbado, Sony CD and Kultur DVD

== Sources ==
- Liner notes from the Rudolf Serkin/Eugene Ormandy recording.
