= KPO =

KPO may refer to:

- KPO, former call sign of San Francisco radio station KNBR (AM)
- Kommunistische Partei Österreichs (Communist Party of Austria), an Austrian political party
- Kommunistische Partei Deutschlands (Opposition)) (Communist Party of Germany (Opposition) (1928–1940), former German political party
- Knight of the Pian Order (Order of Pope Pius IX), lowest rank in that papal order of knighthood
- Knowledge process outsourcing, a business practice
- Ku-ring-gai Philharmonic Orchestra, an amateur orchestra in New South Wales, Australia
- KPO, IATA code for Pohang Airport, South Korea
- Karachaganak Petroleum Operating, operator of the Karachaganak Field in Kazakhstan
- Korean Patriotic Organization, a militant Korean independence activist group
