= Yasunaga =

Yasunaga (written: 安永) is a Japanese surname. Notable people with the surname include:

- Hajime Yasunaga (安永 一, 1901–1994), Japanese Go player
- Kōichirō Yasunaga (安永 航一郎, born 1962), Japanese manga artist
- Reo Yasunaga (安永 玲央, born 2000), Japanese footballer
- Sotaro Yasunaga (安永 聡太郎, born 1976), Japanese footballer
- Tōru Yasunaga (安永 徹, born 1951), Japanese violinist
