= Ku-ring-gai Philharmonic Orchestra =

Community orchestra in Northern Sydney, Australia

The Ku-ring-gai Philharmonic Orchestra
- Philharmonic orchestra
- Short name: KPO
- Founded: 1971; 54 years ago
- Location: Ku-ring-gai, New South Wales, Australia
- Concert hall: The Concourse
- Principal conductor: Paul Terracini
- Website: www.kpo.org.au

The Ku-ring-gai Philharmonic Orchestra (abbreviation – KPO) are an Australian amateur community orchestra located in Ku-ring-gai, New South Wales.

The KPO organizes the New South Wales Secondary Schools Concerto Competition, which attracts entries from numerous state musicians, and a series of Kids' Proms and free community concerts.

The current artistic director is Paul Terracini.

== History ==
The orchestra was founded in 1971 by conductor Helen Quach with the support of the Ku-ring-gai Municipal Council and the Australian Council of the Arts.

The KPO was recognized as Australia's Community Orchestra of the Year in 2002, 2004 and 2007 by the Orchestras of Australia Network.
