= Leonard Bernstein Discusses Humor in Music and Conducts Till Eulenspiegel's Merry Pranks =

1961 album

Leonard Bernstein Discusses Humor in Music and Conduct Till Eulenspiegel's Merry Pranks

Studio album by Leonard Bernstein, New York Philharmonic
- Released: 1961
- Genres: Spoken word, Classical music
- Label: Columbia Masterworks

Leonard Bernstein Discusses Humor in Music and Conducts Till Eulenspiegel's Merry Pranks is an album from Leonard Bernstein and the New York Philharmonic. It was released in 1961 on the Columbia Masterworks label (catalog number ML 5625).

== The work ==
Although the subject similarly appeared as a CBS-televised episode of the Young People's Concerts broadcast on February 28, 1959, the album is a studio recording containing different content and is not necessarily aimed at younger or family listeners.

On the "A" side of the album and a portion of the "B" side, Bernstein reviews the use of humor in classical music, including the use of dissonant notes, non-musical noises, "wrong notes", musical overstatement and understatement, and the role of bassoons and the squeaky E-flat clarinet, among others. On the rest of the "B" side, Bernstein conducts the New York Philharmonic in a performance of Till Eulenspiegel's Merry Pranks, a tone poem by Richard Strauss.

Some examples of pieces from which excerpts were performed include: A Musical Joke by Mozart, Divertissement by Jacques Ibert, Symphony No. 5 and Symphony No. 3 by Beethoven, and Symphony No. 102 in B-flat by Haydn. Unlike the rest, the excerpt of Symphony No. 3 is performed by the Cleveland Orchestra under George Szell.

A portion of the album which excludes the final performance of Till Eulenspiegel's Merry Pranks was remastered in 2013 and is available on YouTube.

== Reception ==
Bernstein received the 1962 Grammy Award for Best Spoken Word Album for the album.

== Track listing ==
Side A

1. Discussion by Bernstein (piano by Bernstein) [22:15]

Side B

1. Continuation of discussion [7:40]
2. Till Eulenspiegel's Merry Pranks, composed by Richard Strauss, performed by the New York Philharmonic conducted by Leonard Bernstein [15:05]
