= Children's March: Over the Hills and Far Away =

Piece by Percy Grainger

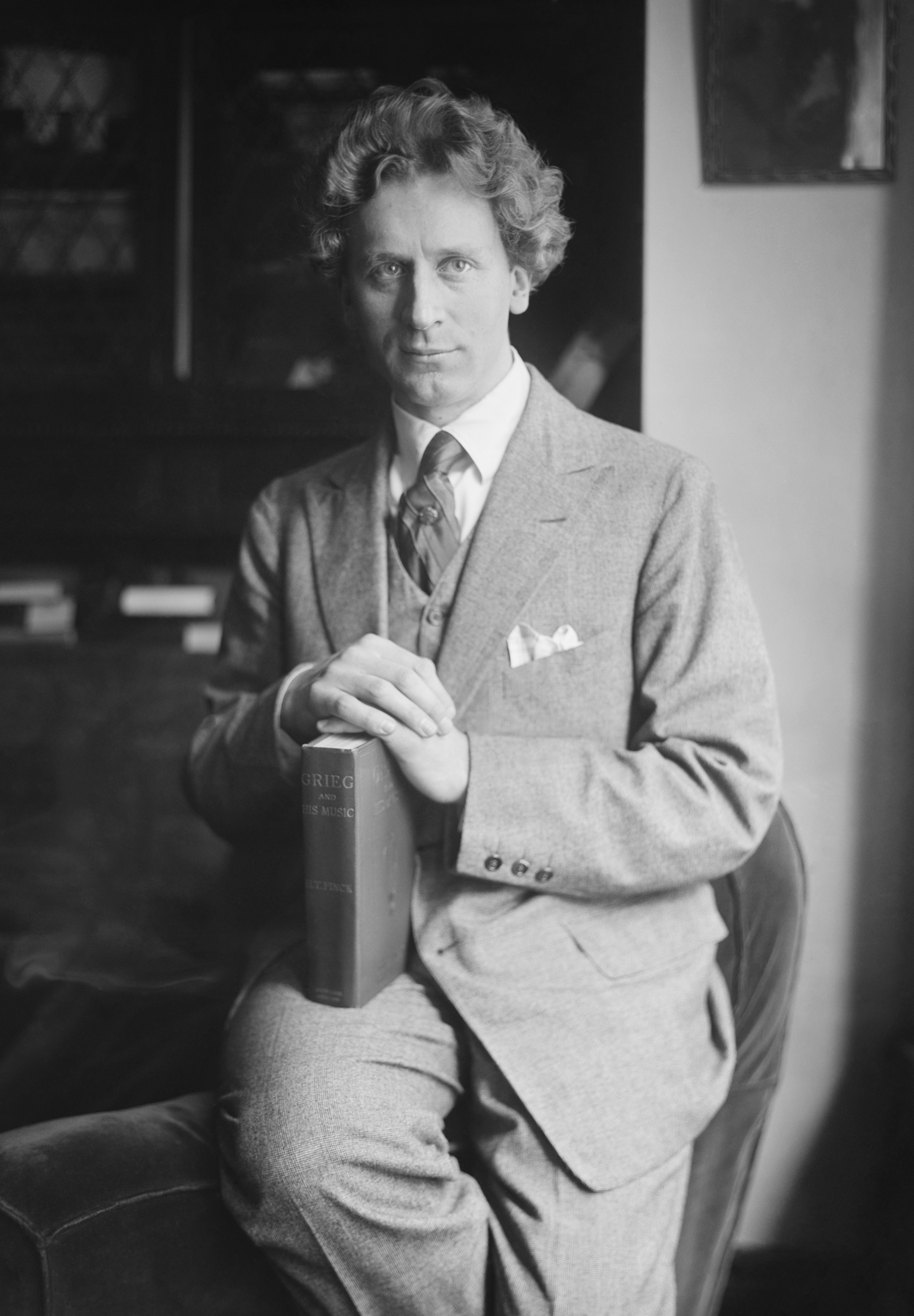
Grainger, c. 1910s

Children's March: Over the Hills and Far Away was written by Percy Grainger as his first original work for band.

It was originally written between 1916 and 1918 as a piano showpiece for World War I relief efforts. However, after enlisting as a bandsman in the United States Army, he quickly orchestrated it for the 15th Coast Artillery Band stationed at Fort Hamilton. However, Grainger was discharged in January 1919 before he had a chance to play the piece with the band. The premiere of the piece occurred 6 June 1919 at Columbia University with the Goldman Band, Ralph Leopold on the piano, and Grainger conducting. An arrangement by Grainger for two pianos was later published in 1920 after a performance by Leopold and Grainger for the Red Cross on 2 December 1919.

The title is a reference to Over the Hills and Far Away by Frederick Delius, who was a close friend of Grainger.

== Versions ==
- Solo piano
- Two pianos, four hands
- Military band scored for:
  - Woodwinds: Piccolo in D♭ or C, 1st and 2nd Flutes; 1st and 2nd Oboes; Bass Oboe (opt. English Horn); E♭ Clarinet; Solo B♭ Clarinet; 1st, 2nd and 3rd B♭ Clarinets; Alto Clarinet; Bass Clarinet; 1st and 2nd Bassoons; Soprano Saxophone; Alto Saxophone; Tenor Saxophone; Baritone Saxophone; Bass Saxophone
  - Brass: Solo B♭ Cornet, 1st, 2nd and 3rd B♭ Cornet; 1st, 2nd, 3rd and 4th E♭ Horns; 1st, 2nd and 3rd Trombones; Euphonium or Baritone; 1st and 2nd Tuba; String Bass; Contrabass Sarrusophone ad lib.
  - Percussion: Snare Drum; Bass Drum; Cymbals; Gong; Woodblock; Tambourine; Castanets; Timpani in C and F; Glockenspiel; Xylophone
  - Piano (ad lib.)
