= Barrie Gavin =

British film and television director (1935–2024)

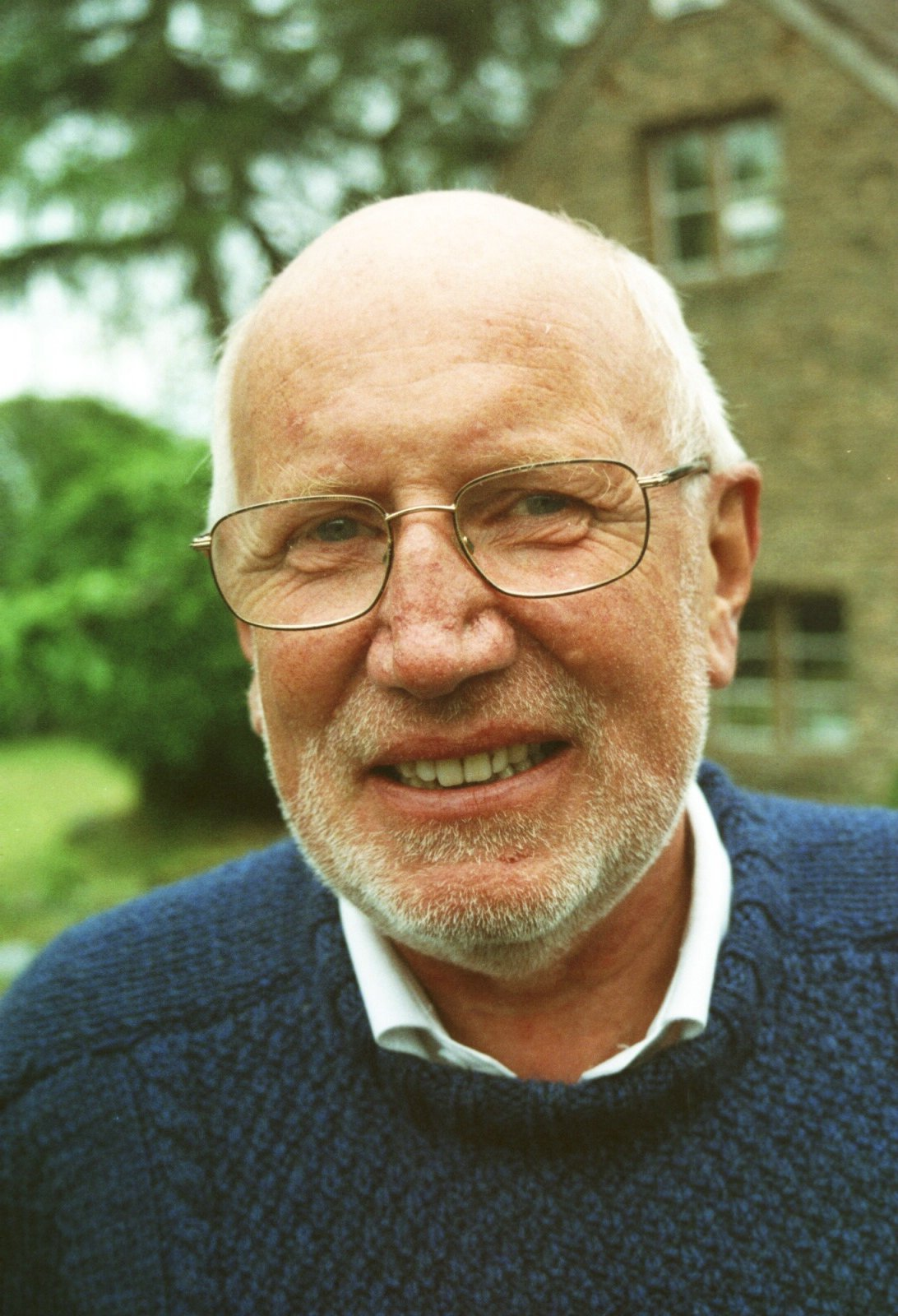
- Gavin in 2005
- Born: 10 June 1935; Stanmore, London, England
- Died: 12 November 2024 (aged 89)
- Occupations: Film and television director

Barrie Vincent Gavin (10 June 1935 – 12 November 2024) was a British film and television director.

== Early life ==
Gavin was born in Stanmore, London on 10 June 1935. His parents were John Gavin and Margaret Gavin (née Elder). He was educated at St Paul's School, and studied history at Corpus Christi College, Cambridge from 1954 to 1957. He joined the BBC as an assistant film editor in 1961. With the opening of BBC Two in 1964 he began to direct programmes principally about music.

In the early years of BBC2, there was regular coverage of chamber music, and Gavin learnt his craft with many studio-based productions. These experiences led to his work as a documentary filmmaker. Gavin subsequently worked at London Weekend Television and the British Film Institute in the 1970s before returning to the BBC.

== Collaboration with Pierre Boulez ==
In 1966, his interest in contemporary music brought him into contact with Pierre Boulez. Over the next 40 years, they collaborated on a series of analytical documentaries on the founding fathers of 20th-century music: Schoenberg, Berg, Webern, Bartók, Stravinsky, Ives, Varese, Messiaen and of course Boulez himself. They made twelve films together:

- Pierre Boulez: Portrait – Analysis – Performance, 1966
- The New Language of Music (Schönberg, Berg, Webern)
- The New Rhythm of Music (Bartók, Stravinsky)
- Telemarteau (Le marteau sans maître)
- The Outsiders (Ives, Varese)
- Olivier Messiaen: Vision and Revolution
- A Different Beauty (Webern) 1977
- The Doors are Open (conducting master classes in Lucerne)
- In Search of the Future (80th birthday portrait for German TV)
- Tomorrow Today (the Boulez years at the BBC) 2005
- Boulez Now (retrospective up to mid-1980s)
- Pierre Boulez: Living in the Present 2005

== Portraits of contemporary composers ==
From the 1970s until the end of the 20th century Gavin specialised in portraits of contemporary composers: Roberto Gerhard, Luciano Berio, Luigi Nono, George Benjamin, Karlheinz Stockhausen, John Adams, Sofia Gubaidulina, Aribert Reimann, Toru Takemitsu, Isang Yun, Harrison Birtwistle, Peter Maxwell Davies, Mark-Anthony Turnage, Oliver Knussen, Hans Werner Henze and many others.

== Films on folk music ==
In 1970, Barrie Gavin began to explore folk music with the writer and musician A. L. Lloyd. Together they travelled across the British Isles and visited Romania, Hungary, the United States. The death of A. L. Lloyd in 1984 brought this work to an end.

== Years in Germany ==
In 1977, Gavin had been invited to Germany to make a film about Kurt Weill. This marked the beginning of a long association with German television, resulting not only in many documentaries (mainly in Frankfurt for the producer Swantje Ehrentreich) but also in a new area of work, directing concerts for television. To date, he has been responsible for some 250 relays of concerts and opera.

== Collaboration with Sir Simon Rattle ==
In the 1980s, Gavin began a collaboration with Sir Simon Rattle, on a series of productions with the City of Birmingham Symphony Orchestra. The list of films created together includes:

- 1911 (a trilogy on a crucial year in music)
- From East to West (a trilogy on the influence of the East on classical music)
- A Symphony in Time of War (Stravinsky – Symphony in three movements)
- Young Apollo (the early works of Britten)
- Carl Nielsen: A Life in six Symphonies
- Leaving Home (a seven-part series on the music of the 20th century)
- Sinfonia (Luciano Berio)
- The Middle of Life (Hans Werner Henze)
- A Romantic Imagination (3-part series on Berlioz)
- Stockhausen: Gruppen (documentary and performance)

== Collaboration with Gerard McBurney ==
In 1989, Gavin worked for the first time with the composer and writer Gerard McBurney. Their co-produced films included:

- Think Today, Speak Tomorrow, Giving Voice, two films on dissident composers in the Soviet Union (from 1990)
- The Fire and the Rose, about Sofia Gubaidulina (from 1990)
- The Face behind the Face (Shostakovich)

In 2006, Gavin began a collaboration with Gerard McBurney and the Chicago Symphony Orchestra on a series of music documentaries, for the Beyond the Score Series. These documentaries included:

- Bartók – The Miraculous Mandarin 2006
- Mozart – Piano Concerto No. 27, K.595 2007
- Tchaikovsky – Symphony No. 4 2008
- Shostakovich – Symphony No. 4 2008
- Holst – The Planets: suite 2008
- Vivaldi – The 4 Seasons 2008
- Mussorgsky/Ravel – Pictures from an Exhibition 2008
- Sibelius – Symphony No. 5 2010
- Dvořák – Symphony No. 9 (From the New World) 2010
- Debussy – La Mer 2010

== Films on arts and literature ==
Whilst much of Gavin's work concentrated on music, he also produced in 1967 a series on classic film directors. He also produced films on literature and the visual arts, which included:

- Sir William in search of Xanadu (Award of Montreal Festival of Films on Art, 1984)
- Images – A History of Early Photography (Award of New York Festival of Films on Art, 1989).

== Later projects ==
In 2007, Gavin finished a film, Finding the Music in Croatia, on the composer Nigel Osborne. In 2008, he received an award from International Music Publishers' Association for Services to Contemporary Music. In 2009, he completed a film Towards and Beyond (Jonathan Harvey), a portrait of the composer. In 2010, he made two short films: A Mind of Winter (George Benjamin) and How Slow the Wind (Toru Takemitsu), using music by these composers. He also started work on a continuing series of archival, unedited interviews, mainly with contemporary composers.

Copies of many of Gavin's films on contemporary music have been deposited in the archives of the Paul Sacher Foundation in Basel, Switzerland.

== Death ==
Gavin died on 12 November 2024, at the age of 89. His widow, the children's writer Jamila Gavin (née Patten), and their two children survive him.

== Filmography ==
- Masterworks, 1966
- Music on 2, 1970
- Omnibus, 1971–73
- Aquarius, 1972
- Scenes from a Geordie Ceilidh, 1976
- A Line Through the Labyrinth, 1977
- Robert Vas Film-maker, 1978
- The Lively Arts, 1977–79
- But Still We Sing, 1979
- Ruddigore, 1982
- The Tenor Man's Story, 1985
- Guitarra, 1985
- Ernest Ansermet: Archives and Memories, 1985
- Towards Antara, 1987
- Leonardo, 1987
- Crossover: Richard Rodney Bennett, 1987
- Billy Budd, 1988
- The Cunning Little Vixen, 1990
- Hector Berlioz: Symphonie fantastique, 1991
- Carmen by Georges Bizet, 1991
- Opus 20 Modern Masterworks: Ernst Krenek, 1991
- Georg Friedrich Händel: Messiah, 1992
- Mlada, 1992
- Berlioz: Messe solennelle, 1993
- Benjamin Britten: War Requiem, 1993
- Cleveland Plays the Proms, 1994
- The Fairy Queen, 1995
- Peter Grimes, 1995
- Soviet Echoes, 1995
- Verdi, 1995
- Leaving Home, 1996
- American Dream: Stephen Collins Foster und seine Zeit, 1997
- In Rehearsal: Christoph von Dohnányi with the Philharmonia Orchestra, 1998
- Between Two Worlds: Erich Wolfgang Korngold, 2001
- All the Russias, 2002

== Videography ==
- New Year's Eve Concert 1992: Richard Strauss Gala, Kultur Video DVD, D4209, 2007
