= Dennis M. Hedlund =

Dennis M. Hedlund was born on September 3, 1947, in Hedley, Texas. He graduated from the University of Texas, Austin, Texas with B.A. in business administration and also served as a major in the U.S. Marine Corps Reserves.

He appeared as an extra in Paul Newman’s Oscar-winning movie Hud, and also in an episode of the TV show Route 66. He later performed on Ted Mack & The Original Amateur Hour television series and would eventually produce a DVD about the history of the Amateur Hour program. He performed as a stand-up comedian for three years.

Later on, he worked as a newscaster and disc jockey at KGNC, Amarillo, Texas; KOMA, Oklahoma City, Oklahoma; WTIX, New Orleans, Louisiana; WFLA, Tampa, Florida.

He was vice president of sales at the Ampex Corporation in New York and then vice-president of Allied Artists Pictures, New York.

Hedlund is the founder and chairman, Kultur International Films Ltd., an award-winning film company started in 1980 that distributes over 3,000 performing arts programs on home video. In 1990 he created White Star Entertainment, producer of original programs for TV, and marketer of over 1,200 non-theatrical home video titles as well as 700 motor sports programs for TV and home video. SRO Entertainment and SRO Sports, was formed in 2000, a producer of sports and comedy programs for TV, and marketer of over 1,200 non-theatrical home video titles.

He is the director of New Jersey Chapter of the Ferrari Club of America, the world's largest Ferrari club.

He is also the founder and chairman of The New Jersey Comedy Festival "King or Queen of Campus Comedy" a comedy festival to prepare college students to become stand-up comedians.
