= Till Eulenspiegel's Merry Pranks =

1895 tone poem by Richard Strauss

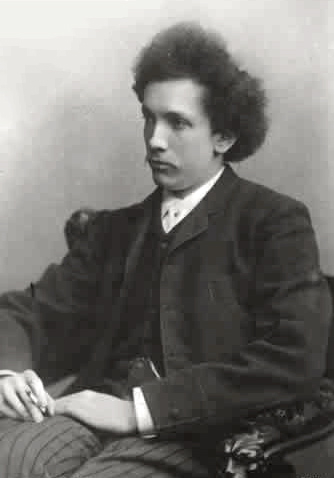
Strauss in 1894, aged 30

Till Eulenspiegel's Merry Pranks (German: Till Eulenspiegels lustige Streiche, pronounced [tɪl ˈoʏ̯lənʃpiːɡl̩s ˈlʊstɪɡə ˈʃtraɪçə]), Op. 28, is a tone poem written in 1894–95 by Richard Strauss. Dedicated to his friend Arthur Seidl, it was first performed on 6 May 1895 by the Gürzenich Orchestra Cologne conducted by Franz Wüllner.

The work chronicles the misadventures and pranks of the German peasant folk hero, prankster Till Eulenspiegel, who is represented by two themes. The first, played by the horn, is a lilting melody that reaches a peak, falls downward, and ends in three long, loud notes, each progressively lower. The second, for D clarinet, is crafty and wheedling, suggesting a trickster doing what he does best.

== Analysis ==
Till Eulenspiegel's Merry Pranks
Transcription for band, United States Navy Band, 2001

The work opens with a "Once upon a time" theme,

as a solo horn bursts in with two repetitions of the first Till theme. This solo is commonly asked for in auditions, and is one of the most important orchestral excerpts for the horn.

The theme is taken by the rest of the orchestra in a rondo form (which Strauss spelled in its French form, rondeau), and this beginning section concludes with the tutti orchestra repeating two notes. The clarinet theme is heard next, suggesting Till's laughter as he plots his next prank.

The music follows Till throughout the countryside, as he rides a horse through a market, upsetting the goods and wares, pokes fun at the strict Teutonic clergy (represented by the violas), flirts with and chases girls (the love theme is given to the first violins), and mocks the serious academics (represented by the bassoons).

The music suggesting a horse ride returns again, with the first theme restated all over the orchestra. The climax abruptly changes to a funeral march. Till has been captured by the authorities, and is sentenced to death for blasphemy. The funeral march of the headsman begins a dialogue with the desperate Till, who tries to wheedle and joke his way out of this predicament. Unfortunately, he has no effect on the stony executioner, who hangs him. The progress of Till being hauled up the gallows is graphically painted by the D clarinet, with the anticipatory drumroll emulated by the flutes after he has reached the top. The D clarinet wails in a distortion of the first theme, signifying his death scream as the drop begins, and a pizzicato by the strings represents the snapping of his neck as the noose rope reaches full extension. After a moment of silence, the "once upon a time" theme heard at the beginning returns, suggesting that someone like Till can never be destroyed, and the work ends with one last quotation of the musical joke.

== Instrumentation ==
The work is scored for a large orchestra:

Woodwinds
piccolo
3 flutes
3 oboes
English horn
2 clarinets in B♭
D clarinet (Note: Although the original score calls for a clarinet in D, the part is usually played on an E♭ clarinet as the D clarinet is now rarely played.)
bass clarinet
3 bassoons
contrabassoon

Brass
4 horns in F and E
4 horns in D (ad libitum) (Note: Strauss indicates four extra horns and three extra trumpets to be added ad libitum. The parts are to be played by separate players from the original four horns and three trumpets.)
3 trumpets in F and C
3 trumpets in D (ad libitum)
3 trombones
tuba

Percussion
timpani
bass drum
snare drum
cymbals
triangle
large ratchet

Strings
violins I, II
violas
cellos
double basses

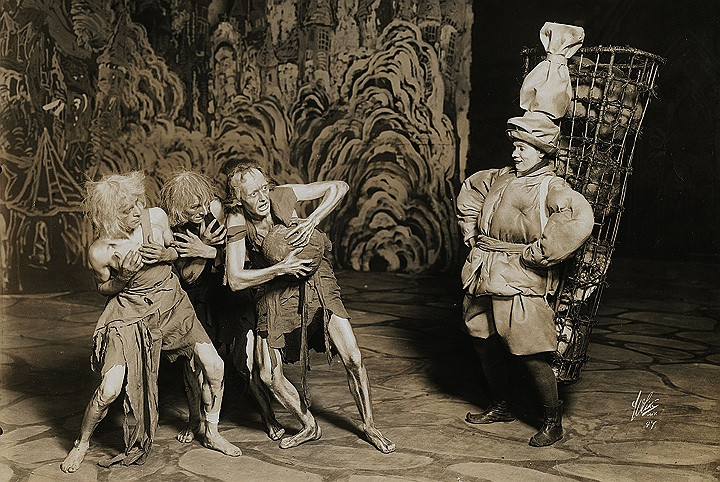
Scene from the ballet Till Eulenspiegel, Manhattan Opera House, New York

There also exists a version for piano four-hands, which has been recorded by Percy Grainger and Ralph Leopold. In 2021, the music publisher Edition Peters of Leipzig published an arrangement of Till Eulenspiegels lustige Streiche for chamber ensemble (12 players) by Germán García Vargas.

== Ballet ==
The work was presented as a ballet with choreography by Vaslav Nijinsky in 1916.

== Discography ==
- Leonard Bernstein Discusses Humor in Music and Conducts Till Eulenspiegel's Merry Pranks, Columbia Masterworks ML5625 (1961)
- Berlin Philharmonic Orchestra conducted by Claudio Abbado, Sony CD and Kultur DVD
