= Ralph Leopold =

American pianist and piano teacher

Ralph Leopold (14 February 1884 – 10 July 1955) was an American pianist and piano teacher.

== Biography ==
Ralph Herman Leopold was born in 1884 in Pottstown, Pennsylvania, the son of Howard Leopold. His sister Elizabeth Leopold married Newton D. Baker, who in 1912 was considered a possible vice-presidential running mate to Woodrow Wilson, and from 1916 to 1921 was United States Secretary of War.

By 1911, he was teaching in Berlin, and played with the Berlin Philharmonic Orchestra.

In World War I he was attached to the Army Bandmaster's School at Governors Island, Here he met and became a close friend of the Australian-born pianist and composer Percy Grainger, who had become an American citizen in June 1918.

Leopold and Grainger gave the first performance of the piano duet version of Grainger's "Children's March: Over the Hills and Far Away". Leopold was also the solo pianist in the first performance of the version for band and piano, with Grainger conducting the Goldman Band (6 June 1919).

After the war, Leopold played again in America and Europe, where he appeared with several orchestras. On return to the United States he taught in Cleveland, Toledo, Texas, New York City and a period at the Curtis Institute of Music in Philadelphia. His students included Richard Franko Goldman, Hugh Hodgson and Max Helfman.

On 9 November 1925 in a recital in New York he played Ernst von Dohnányi's Four Rhapsodies, Op. 11, and a review credited him with "rediscovering Dohnányi".

Ralph Leopold died on 10 July 1955, aged 71.

== Recordings ==
Ralph Leopold is now remembered mainly for a series of piano roll recordings he made, either in four-hand works with Percy Grainger, or as a solo pianist. The four-hand recordings include:

- Grainger's arrangement of Delius's Rhapsody Brigg Fair and North Country Sketches
- Tchaikovsky's Romeo and Juliet Fantasy-Overture, arr. Nadezhda Rimskaya-Korsakova
- Richard Strauss's Till Eulenspiegel's Merry Pranks.

The solo recordings include:

- various selections from Wagner's Tannhäuser, Lohengrin, Tristan und Isolde, and the four Ring of the Nibelung operas
- Beethoven's Piano Sonata No. 16 in G major, Op. 31/1.

He also made a small number of 78 rpm acoustic recordings.
