= Helen Quach =

Vietnamese-born symphony conductor

- Quach circa 1977
- Born: 4 July 1940; Saigon, French Indochina
- Died: 31 July 2013 (aged 73); Canberra, Australia
- Occupation: Symphony conductor
- Years active: 1958–2008
- Employers: New York Philharmonic; Ku-ring-gai Philharmonic Orchestra; Manila Symphony Orchestra

Helen Quach (/kwɒk/ "quok"; 4 July 1940 – 31 July 2013) was a Vietnamese-born symphony conductor who founded the Ku-ring-gai Philharmonic Orchestra in Sydney, served as the music director of the Manila Symphony Orchestra and guest conducted for symphonies around the world.

Quach was educated in New South Wales, where she studied under noted Russian conductor Nikolai Malko. She then took a conducting course from Sir John Barbirolli and Carlo Zecchi in Italy before moving to the US to serve as an assistant to Leonard Bernstein. She is considered as the first Asian female conductor hired by Bernstein in 1967. (The first female conductor hired by Bernstein was Sylvia Caduff in 1960). Helen Quach spent much of her adult life in Australia and the Philippines. Critics often commented on her toughness in spite of a diminutive appearance.

== Early life ==
Quach was born in Saigon on 4 July 1940, to Chinese parents; her father was in business and her mother was a musician. Quach began playing the piano at the age of five. She moved to Australia when she was ten years old. Her parents had sent her there to increase her educational opportunities but also to keep her away from war. She studied at the Brigidine Convent in Randwick, New South Wales. Quach later studied at the New South Wales Conservatorium of Music.

Quach came from an academically oriented family. Her two brothers both became physicians. On her decision to attend a music conservatory, she said she thought that universities become "too academic. I don't like to clutter up my life with all those degrees."

In 1958, Quach was a second-year student at the NSW Conservatorium when she became one of the first two women awarded a scholarship to study under noted conductor Nikolai Malko, who was then the musical director of the Sydney Symphony Orchestra. The announcements of the award had specifically excluded women, but Malko said he reconsidered because Quach and the other female recipient were "more than usually talented". In 1964, Quach won a scholarship for a conducting course taught by Sir John Barbirolli and Carlo Zecchi in Sicily.

She appeared as a contestant on the November 13, 1966, episode of US panel game show What's My Line?.

== Career ==
Quach moved to New York in 1967, having won the Dimitri Mitropoulos International Conducting Competition, which came with a position as an assistant to Leonard Bernstein at the New York Philharmonic. Quach was able to conduct the Philharmonic at a gala concert and on Bernstein's television series. "Miss Quach runs the danger of being a pretty young woman, and thus conquering all hearts for non-musical reasons. But ... she seems to be at her best in works of large dimension (odd for so diminutive a creature) and if there can be such a thing as a maestra, Miss Quach could well be it," Bernstein said.

Quach returned to Sydney in 1969 to give a concert with the Sydney Symphony Orchestra. "I have a choleric temperament, kept well under control – forceful when I conduct, but very quiet and ready to listen when away from my baton. I am a woman. I like a lot of personal attention," she said of herself at the time. As an early-career conductor, Quach also spent three- to four-year stints in Paris, Hong Kong and Taiwan. In the late 1960s, she worked with a children's orchestra in Taipei. Because of her toughness with the children, Quach was called a "woman tyrant" by Chinese newspapers.

In 1971, Quach founded the Ku-ring-gai Philharmonic Orchestra in Sydney. Three years later, she was named the music director of the Manila Symphony Orchestra. By the late 1970s, she was spending six months out of the year conducting the Hong Kong Philharmonic Orchestra and the other half of the year travelling as a guest conductor. From 1980 to 1983, she conducted the Taiwan Symphony Orchestra. She said that the Taiwanese people were not ready for her style of music at that time.

As Quach was breaking into conducting under Bernstein, conducting was dominated by males; no major symphony had employed a female conductor full-time, and only a few women had ever served as guest conductors. In 1977, about a decade into her career, Quach was one of very few females conducting major symphonies anywhere in the world (others included Sarah Caldwell of Boston, Sylvia Caduff, and Zheng Xiaoying). Still, Quach once said that she felt she had been most hindered by people of her own ethnicity. "As you know, an orchestra is supported by the society and Chinese society is not the best soil to develop musical talents. All parents want their children to become doctors or engineers. Nobody wants their children to dedicate their lives to music," she said.

== Later life ==
While living in Taipei, Quach was diagnosed with cancer. She refused conventional medical treatment and moved back to Australia. Quach developed a following in the Philippines and she returned to the country in 2007 and 2008. On the latter trip, she conducted the Philippine Philharmonic Orchestra for La bohème.

Quach died of cancer in Canberra on 31 July 2013. Reporting on her death, the Philippine Daily Inquirer referred to Quach as "the dragon lady of the podium". Quach never married. "I just never met anyone that I wanted to share my life permanently with," she had explained in the 1980s.
