= Tōru Yasunaga =

Japanese violinist

- Born: November 14, 1951 (age 74); Fukuoka, Japan
- Other name: 安永 徹
- Occupation: violinist
- Website: official site

Tōru Yasunaga (安永 徹, Yasunaga Tōru; born November 14, 1951, in Fukuoka Prefecture) is a Japanese violinist. Yasunaga is an active chamber musician and soloist, and was a member of the Berlin Philharmonic from 1977, serving as concertmaster from 1983 until his retirement from the orchestra in March 2009.

== Biography ==
Tōru Yasunaga was born in Fukuoka Prefecture, Japan in 1951. He took violin lessons under Toshiya Eto from age 13. In 1974, Yasunaga graduated from Toho Gakuen School of Music, and later studied at the Berlin University of the Arts. He studied under Michel Schwalbé.

In 1971 while still a student, he won the First Prize at the 40th Music Competition of Japan. In 1977, he joined the Berlin Philharmonic, and in 1983, he was appointed by Herbert von Karajan to be first concertmaster of the orchestra.

In 2009, Yasunaga retired from the Berlin Philharmonic. That same year, he received the Order of Merit of the Federal Republic of Germany (Verdienstkreuz am Bande) for his contributions to music and culture. He moved to Hokkaido and still continues musical performances. He periodically has recitals with his wife, Ayumi Ichino.

== Videography ==
- New Year's Eve Concert 1992: Richard Strauss Gala, conducted by Claudio Abbado, Kultur Video DVD, D4209, 2007
