= Paul Terracini =

Australian classical musician (born 1957)

Paul Terracini (born 1957) is an Australian composer, conductor, and educator.

== Life and career ==
Terracini (paulterracini.com.au) started out his musical career holding a permanent position of principal trumpet from 1975 till 1979 with the Australian Opera and Ballet Orchestra. He was lecturer in trumpet, concert band, brass ensemble, and big band at the Queensland Conservatorium of Music from 1982 till 1988. He spent about twenty years in Europe, playing solo trumpet at the Danish Chamber Players from 1991 till 2007 and touring Asia, South America, the USA and all across Europe. For 16 years he was chairman of the Storstrøm Symphony Orchestra in Denmark. Back in Australia as a trumpet player he appeared as soloist with ensembles like the Melbourne Symphony Orchestra, the Queensland Symphony Orchestra, the Tasmanian Symphony Orchestra and the West Australian Symphony Orchestra.

As a conductor he recorded ten classical albums with the Prague Symphony Orchestra. Also he has been president of the Danish Bel Canto Society, conducted at the German opera festival Rossini in Wildbad, led orchestras in Denmark and Italy through concerts and operas. Furthermore, he taught at different schools and colleges of higher musical education in Europa and China.

As a composer Terracini has become known through ensembles like Chicago Symphony Orchestra Brass, the New York Philharmonic, the Prague Symphony Orchestra, the Sydney Symphony Orchestra Brass and the Australian Chamber Orchestra who have been playing his works. Especially his compositions for film and television gained popularity to the extent of his theme music for Australian TV series, Classical Destinations, being collected onto Decca Records' Number 1 Classical Album of 2007. 2010 he composed two works for the International Trumpet Guild annual conference and conducted the gala concerts of that event. His most recent CD, Paul Terracini – Music for Brass, (Tall Poppies TP224) was chosen as Best Ensemble CD of the Year for 2016 by Brass Band World magazine, UK.

Apart from his musical activities, Terracini holds a bachelor of theology degree, a first class honours bachelor of arts degree, and a PhD in religious studies. He has been artistic director and principal conductor of the Penrith Symphony Orchestra in Sydney since 2010, and artistic director and chief conductor of the Kuringgai Philharmonic Orchestra since 2017 as well as fulfilling a busy schedule as freelance composer and conductor in Australia and internationally. He is the artistic director and one of the founders of the Penrith Youth Orchestra, a project created in collaboration with the Australian Chamber Orchestra, Penrith Symphony Orchestra, and Joan Sutherland Performing Arts Centre. His book, John Stoward Moyes and the Social Gospel, was published in 2015. Criminal defence barrister Winston Terracini and operatic baritone and former artistic director of Opera Australia, Lyndon Terracini, are his brothers.

== Discography ==
- Paul Terracini: Music for Brass. Tall Poppies TP224
- Symphonic Hymns of the Forefathers. ABC Classics ABC472 189-2
- Hymns of the Forefathers 2. ABC Classics ABC 476 160-0
- Cherished Hymns (3-CD Set) ABC Classics 476 6144
- Lead Kindly Light (choral a cappella) ABC Classics ABC 476 159-9
- Verter (opera, live, commercially released recording from Rossini Festival, Bad Wilbad, Germany). Bongiovanni GB 2343-2
- Symphony of Hope. Bredon Hill BHMCD 1021
- Symphony of Hope 2. Bredon Hill BMHCD 1035
- As Incense. Bredon Hill BMHCD 1031
- Kirkens Store Salmer. Refleks Music 11290022
- Classical Destinations. EMI Classics 09463944225
- Classical Destinations II. Sony/BMG 88697359472
- The Number One Classical Album 2007. Decca 442 9157
- Rhapsodie, Fantasie, Poeme. Melba MR 301117
- The Trilogy. Kingsway Music KMCD 2369
- The Praise Symphony Project. Coventry Music 50010-2
- Orchestral Mastertrax. Soundtrax SML 1013
- Drama Themes. Soundtrax SML 1010
- Scores for the Screen. Soundtrax SML 1023
- Let the Games Begin. Soundtrax SML 1016
- Scores for the Screen. Presentation CD
