= Kultur International Films =

Film company

Kultur Video is a film company that specializes in the distribution and production of performing arts, history, literature, theater, and other genres on DVD, Blu-ray, and Streaming Video. The company has issued famous television programs by such artists as Leonard Bernstein, Luciano Pavarotti, Placido Domingo, Rudolf Nureyev, Margot Fonteyn, and Mikhail Baryshnikov.

Among their releases are Baryshnikov's production of The Nutcracker, Leonard Bernstein's Young People's Concerts, Mathew Bourne's Swan Lake, Hal Holbrook's Mark Twain Tonight, La Boheme featuring Luciano Pavarotti, The Life & Times of Nelson Mandela, the Birmingham Royal Ballet production of Cinderella, and The Best of Riverdance.

Kultur Video has also been responsible for the Broadway Theatre Archive, a large selection on DVD of telecasts ranging from 1959 to 1990 of classic and modern plays, shown mostly on PBS.

The company distributes some of the most premiere names in opera and ballet including Warner Classics, Arthaus Music, ITV, The Australian Broadcasting Company, & many more. It has been operating for over 30 years.

The company was founded by Dennis Hedlund who currently serves as its chairman. Kultur is distributed by BayView Entertainment. www.kultur.com

== See also ==
- New Year's Eve Concert 1992: Richard Strauss Gala
