= Don Juan (Strauss) =

Tone poem for large orchestra by the German composer Richard Strauss

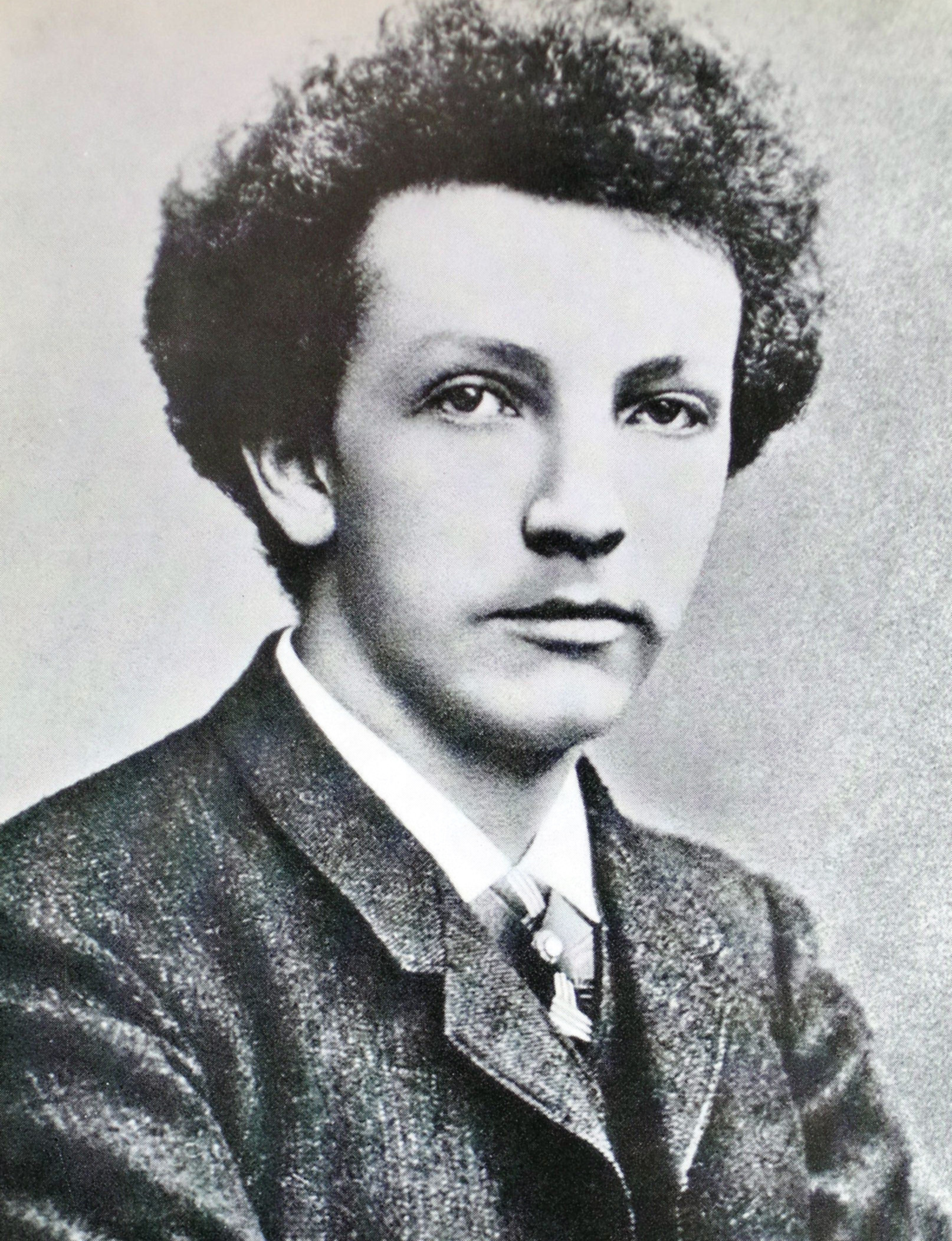
Strauss in 1888, the year he composed Don Juan

Excerpt from a 1992 recording by the Frankfurt Radio Symphony conducted by Dmitri Kitayenko

Don Juan, Op. 20, is a tone poem in E major for large orchestra written by the German composer Richard Strauss in 1888. The work is based on Don Juans Ende, a play derived from an unfinished 1844 retelling of the tale by poet Nikolaus Lenau after the Don Juan legend which originated in Renaissance-era Spain. Strauss reprinted three excerpts from the play in his score. In Lenau's rendering, Don Juan's promiscuity springs from his determination to find the ideal woman. Despairing of ever finding her, he ultimately surrenders to melancholy and wills his own death. It is singled out by Carl Dahlhaus as a "musical symbol of fin-de-siècle modernism", particularly for the "breakaway mood" of its opening bars.

Performances of the work last around 18 minutes. Excerpts from Don Juan are staples of professional orchestral auditions due to the numerous technical and musical demands on each instrument.

== Premieres ==
The premiere of Don Juan took place on 11 November 1889 in Weimar, where Strauss, then twenty-five, served as Court Kapellmeister; he conducted the orchestra of the Weimar Opera. The work, composed when Strauss was only twenty-four years old, became an international success and established his reputation as an important exponent of modernism. Strauss often conducted the work in concerts during his long career, and the piece was part of the first recordings that he made in 1917. The last time he conducted the work was in 1947 with the BBC Symphony Orchestra during his last tour outside of Germany.

The French premiere was on 29 November 1891 in Paris at the Concerts Lamoureux, under the baton of Charles Lamoureux.

== Reception ==
Although Don Juan was an undeniable triumph for Strauss, the work was not without its critics. Cosima Wagner, who was normally a supporter of Strauss and his music, despised the work because of its subject matter which did not rise to the metaphysical ideals of Wagner. The New Grove Dictionary of Music and Musicians states that "The aesthetics of Wagner and Liszt may have inspired him to embrace the extra-musical, but he refused to carry their torch for music as a sacred entity; the libertine Don (and Strauss with him) simply thumbs his nose at the world."

== Instrumentation ==
Don Juan is scored for an orchestra with the following instruments:

Woodwinds
3 flutes (3rd doubling piccolo)
2 oboes
1 English horn
2 clarinets in A
2 bassoons
1 contrabassoon

Brass
4 horns in E
3 trumpets in E
3 trombones
1 tuba

Percussion
timpani

triangle
cymbals
glockenspiel

Strings
harp
violins I, II
violas
celli
double basses

An orchestral score and a score for piano four hands was published by J. Aibl in Leipzig in 1890.

== Themes, form, and analysis ==
The structure of Don Juan mirrors the dramatic arc of the poem Don Juans Ende by Nikolaus Lenau. The music unfurls naturally as the plot divulges itself. Strauss achieves this by a sophisticated merging of both rondo and sonata form principles. Musicologists Bryan Gilliam and Charles Youmans described the work as containing "dazzling orchestration, sharply etched themes, novel structure and taut pacing" and being characterized by "flagrantly pictorial, humorous and altogether irreverent" music.

At the beginning of the piece, Strauss uses a theme that is vigorous and spirited with the brass section making striking interjections. He moves away from this theme soon after to a solo violin playing a romance. The oboe is then heard playing a soothing melody that indicates a liaison between Don Juan and his lover. This moment is interrupted by dissonant horns, which counter with a heroic and self-assured theme. Strauss then weaves themes together in a repeated and intermingled orchestration. The work subsequently moves abruptly into a quiet melancholy which Strauss uses to illustrate the coming tragedy of Don Juan's fate. The piece ends wistfully, and not grandly, in keeping with Lenau's telling of the Don Juan tale. Don Juan, tired of running, resigns himself willingly in a duel and his life is taken by a sword wielded by his lover's father who is avenging his daughter's honor. The piece paints this picture with hushed tones like a dying breath.
