= Sylvia Caduff =

Swiss orchestral conductor

Sylvia Caduff (born 7 January 1937) is a Swiss orchestral conductor.

In the 1960s she was assistant to Leonard Bernstein at the New York Philharmonic, one of the first women to conduct this orchestra.

In the late 1970s she became the first woman to hold a post of principal conductor (Chefdirigentin) for a German orchestra, when she took up a post in Solingen.

On 15 October 1978 she conducted the Berlin Philharmonic, as a guest conductor substituting for Herbert von Karajan who was unwell. She was the seventh woman to conduct the orchestra since its foundation, and the only one between 1930 and 2008.
